= Hinduism in the United States =

Hindu Americans

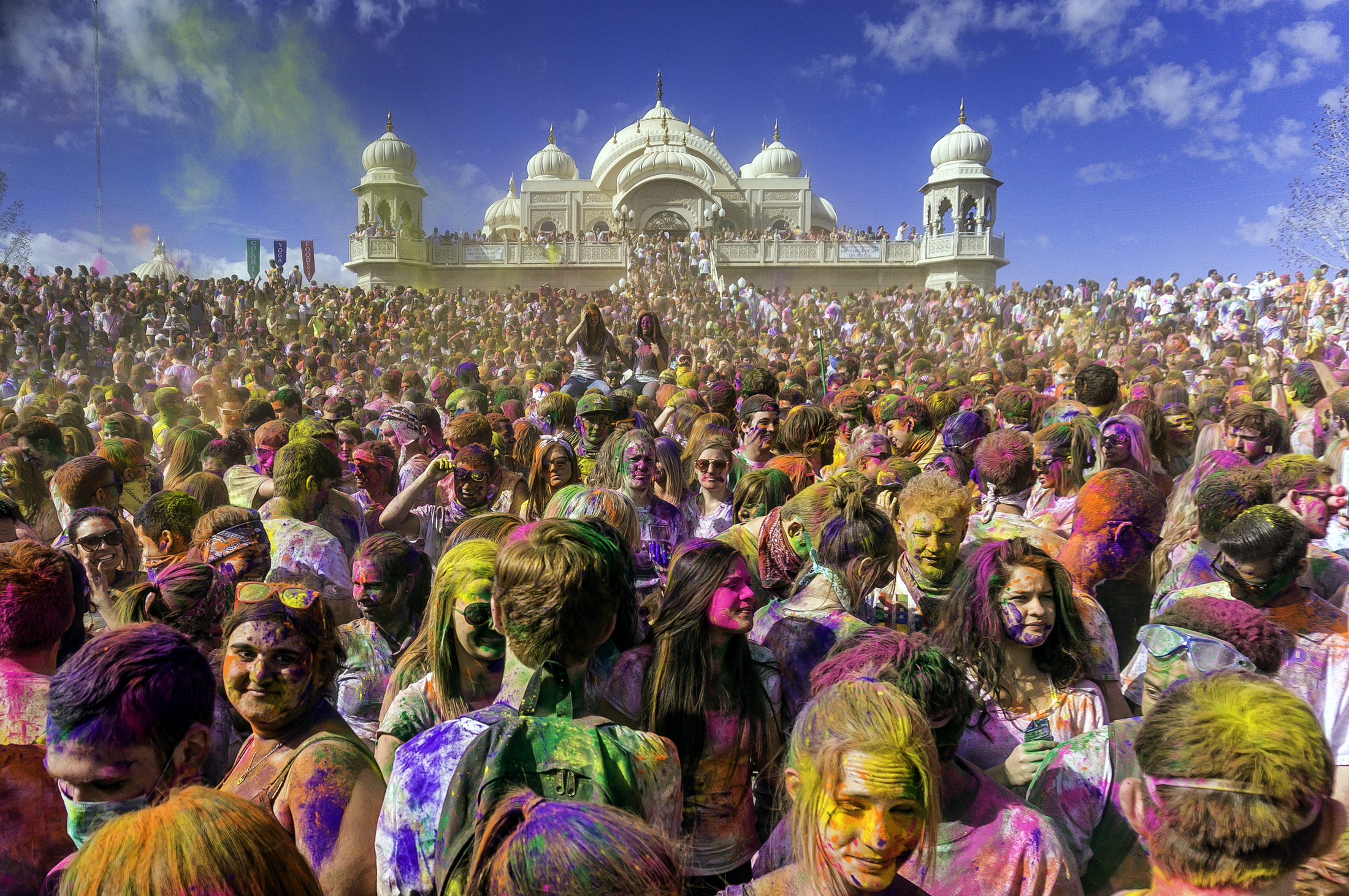
- Holi festival celebrations at Radha Krishna Temple in Spanish Fork, Utah

Total population
- 3,369,976 (2021) ▲1% of U.S. Population; 2016 Public Religion Research Institute data 0.7% of the U.S. Population; 2015 Pew Research Center data

Regions with significant populations
- California: 778,804
- New Jersey: 278,600
- (New York (state)) New York: 202,157
- Massachusetts: 140,027
- Illinois: 128,125
- Ohio: 117,800
- Texas: 112,153

Languages
- Majority spoken languages: English; Hindi and its varieties; Gujarati; Bengali; Telugu; Punjabi; Nepali; Marathi; Malayalam; Kannada; Sindhi; Kashmiri; Assamese; Dogri; Odia; other languages

Hinduism in the United States is a religious tradition practiced by around 1% of the American population, with roots in the Indian Hinduism. Hindu Americans in the United States largely include first and second generation immigrants from India and other South Asian countries, while there are also converts to Hinduism and other adherents. Several aspects related to Hinduism, such as yoga, karma, and meditation have been adopted into mainstream American beliefs and lifestyles.

Hinduism includes a range of traditions that are unified by the principles of dharma, a cosmic order, and shared concepts from primary Hindu scriptures such as the Bhagavad Gita. Hindus believe that the Supreme God may manifest through revered deities, including Shiva, Rama, Krishna, and Durga. Hinduism has no central religious authority, and Hindus are free to follow different texts and deities. Around 33% of Americans believe in reincarnation, an important concept in Hinduism and Buddhism. Om is a widely chanted mantra, particularly among Millennials and practitioners of yoga and New Age philosophy.

Historically, the early influence of Hindu philosophy in America can be traced to Founding Father John Adams, who took a keen interest in the Hindu concept of the Eternal God. Nineteenth-century American Transcendentalist philosophers Emerson and Thoreau read the Bhagavad Gita and noted the influence of Hindu principles. In 1893, Swami Vivekananda's address to the World's Parliament of Religions in Chicago was one of the first public discussions of Hinduism in the United States. In 1925, Paramahansa Yogananda became the first Kriya Yoga teacher to settle in America. In the 1960s, Beatles member George Harrison incorporated the Hindu mantra Hare Krishna into his music, helping popularize Hinduism in the United States.

After the passage of the Immigration and Nationality Act of 1965, the Hindu community in the US began to grow. As a result of US immigration policies that favored educated and skilled migrants from India, Hindu Americans have relatively high levels of education and household incomes. They have also achieved prominence in the U.S. technology sector, including as CEOs of major technology companies. Hindu Americans have also become active in politics, even including presidential primary candidates Vivek Ramaswamy and Tulsi Gabbard.

== History ==
=== Early influences ===
In 1721, Cotton Mather, a missionary clergy in New England, published India Christiana, drawing parallels between the "heathens" of India and Native Americans. In 1784, Hannah Adams published An Alphabetical Compendium, which utilised British sources to categorise "Hindoo" beliefs. In 1799, British Unitarian clergyman, Joseph Priestley published A Comparison of the Institutions of Moses With Those of the Hindoos and Other Ancient Nations, in which he claimed the Old Testament to be superior to the Hindu scriptures. John Adams, a Founding Father interested in ancient Hindu texts, challenged Priestley's comparison owing to a lack of translated Hindu texts. In 1813, Adams wrote to Thomas Jefferson, that he was impressed by the Hindu concept of the Eternal God, "God is one, creator of all, Universal Sphere, without beginning, without End." Jefferson also showed interest in Indian literature, such as Sakuntala.

=== Transcendentalism and theosophy ===
During the 1820s, the Bengali reformer Raja Ram Mohan Roy translated Hindu scriptures which challenged missionary reports of Hinduism as an idolatrous tradition and influenced Unitarians by presenting a monotheistic interpretation of the Vedas. This work interested Transcendentalist philosophers such as Ralph Waldo Emerson and Henry David Thoreau to integrate concepts from the Bhagavad Gita and the Upanishads into their philosophies. Although initially sceptical, Emerson later regarded Vedantic non-dualism as deeply resonant with his belief in an inner, divine essence, and he encoded these views in essays like The Over-Soul and poems such as "Brahma."

In his 1854 book, Walden, Thoreau detailed his spiritual retreat at the Walden Pond, Massachusetts, where he read the Bhagavad Gita daily and did yoga. He also called himself as "yogi" and noted that his simple living was inspired by the Gita. Around 1857, Emerson, noted that Gita's message was an allegory for the inner battle between good and evil in the human soul. Many scholars have since recognized Bhagavad Gita as a central text in Hinduism that synthesizes various strands of Hindu religious thought, including the Vedic concept of dharma (duty, rightful action); samkhya-based yoga and jnana (knowledge); and bhakti (devotion).

However, early engagement between American thinkers and Hindu ideas in the 19th century was also shaped by Orientalism, often reducing the Hindu religion to mystical abstraction or primitive superstition. In 1875, Helena Blavatsky and Henry Steel Olcott established the Theosophical Society which popularised Hindu ideas among American audiences through constructing a universalist spiritual system centred on karma, reincarnation, and divine wisdom. In 1879, Blavatsky visited India and met with Dayanand Saraswati, founder of the Arya Samaj. Saraswati opposed both Christian evangelism and popular Hindu ritualism. While Blavatsky had hoped to enlist Saraswati in the Theosophical movement, Saraswati rejected the Society's reinterpretations of the Vedas.

=== Institutional foundations ===
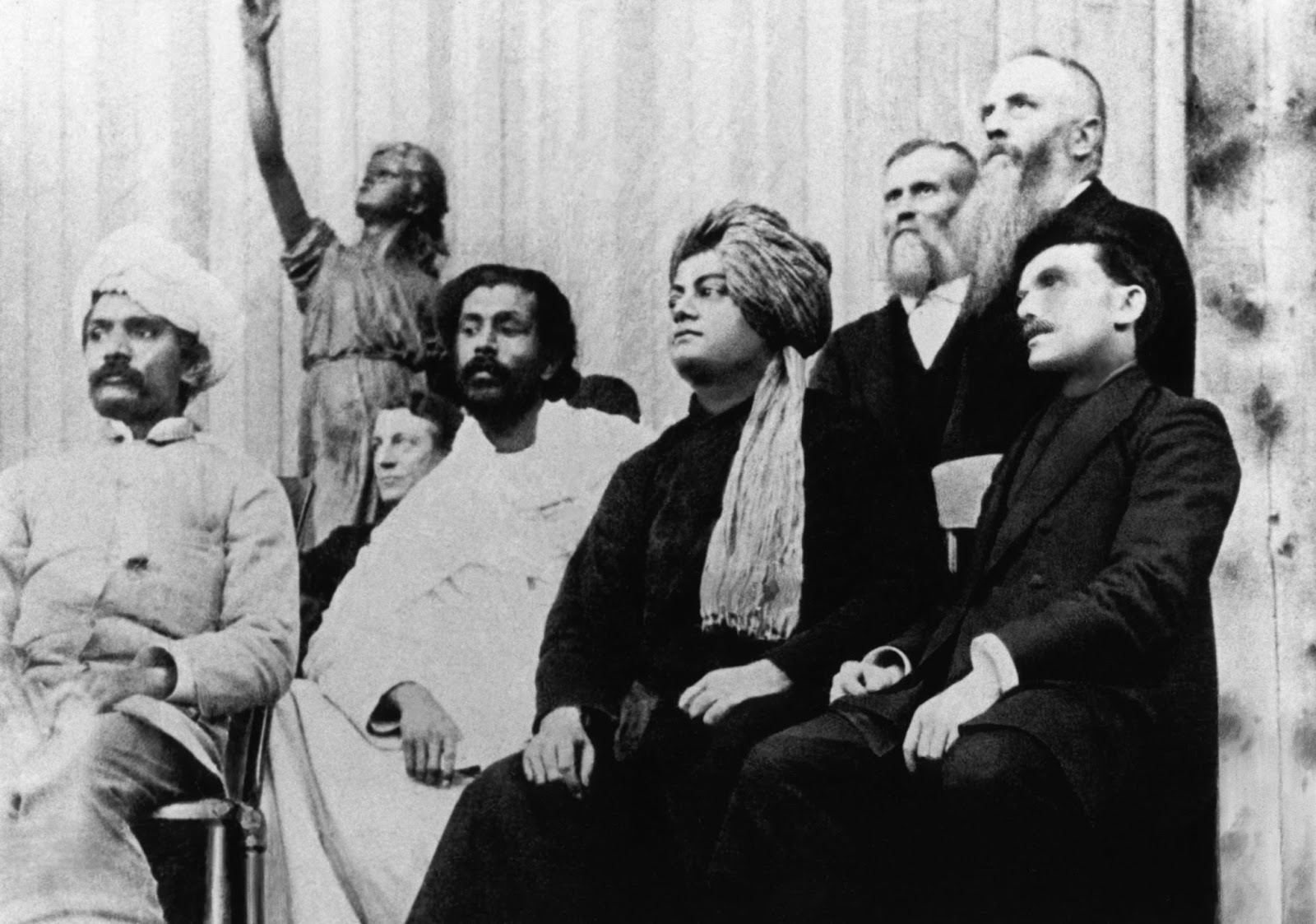
Swami Vivekananda on the Platform of the Parliament of Religions in Chicago in 1893.

In 1893, Swami Vivekananda's address to the World's Parliament of Religions in Chicago was one of the first major discussions of Hinduism in the United States. Swami Vivekananda's speeches in America contained numerous references to the Gita, and the four yogas – bhakti, jnana, karma, and raja, and through the message of the Gita, Vivekananda sought to re-emphasize the core tenets of Hindu thought both in India and America. He established the first American Vedanta Society in New York in 1894 and initiated twelve renunciates at Thousand Island Park in 1895. He also introduced Yoga philosophy and a mixture of yoga breathwork (pranayama) and meditation. Starting in 1902, Swami Rama Tirtha spent two years speaking on the philosophy of Vedanta in the United States.

In 1920, Paramahansa Yogananda was India's delegate to the International Congress of Religious Liberals held in Boston. He embarked on a speaking tour in the US before settling in Los Angeles in 1925, where he trained disciples in Kriya Yoga. Yogananda was among the first Indian Yoga teachers to settle in the US and to be hosted in the White House in 1927. He published his Autobiography of a Yogi in 1946, which was recognized as one of the best spiritual books of the 20th century.

=== Modern developments ===
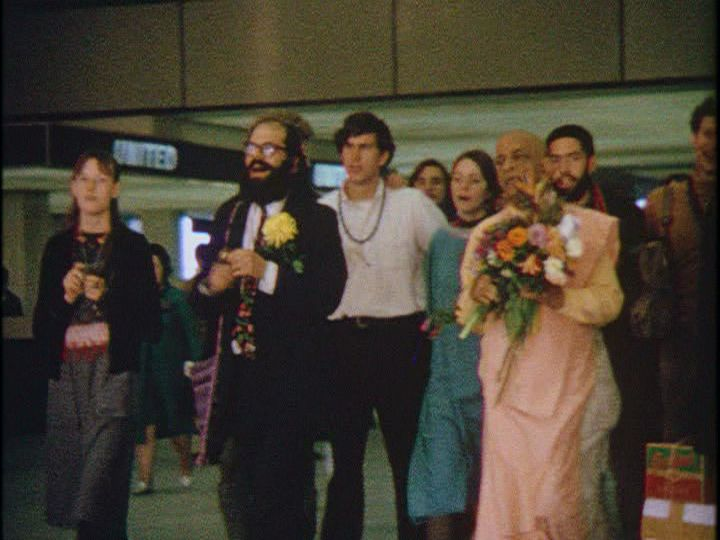
Swami Prabhupada's arrival in San Francisco in 1967

The Immigration and Nationality Act of 1965 allowed for Asian Indians to settle in the U.S. This legislation coincided with the U.S. counter-culture and interest in Eastern spirituality. In 1965, A.C. Bhaktivedanta Swami founded the International Society for Krishna Consciousness. Ram Dass, George Harrison, and Allen Ginsberg were also influential in the spread of Hinduism in the United States.

Ram Dass was a Harvard professor known as Richard Alpert who traveled to India in 1967 and studied under Neem Karoli Baba. He returned the West as a Hindu teacher and changed his name to Ram Dass, which means servant of Rama (one of the Hindu gods). Jeffery Kagel commonly known as Krishna Das, went to India in the sixties and returned to America as a practitioner of Bhakti yoga and singer of Hindu devotional music known as kirtan (chanting the names of God), described by the New York Times as "the chant master of American yoga".

Beatles member George Harrison became a devotee of Swami Prabhupada. Harrison started to record songs with the words "Hari Krishna" in the lyrics and was widely responsible for popularizing Hinduism in America in the 1960s and 1970s. His song, My Sweet Lord, became the biggest-selling single of 1971 in the United Kingdom. In 1967, the Human Be-In event held in San Francisco's Golden Gate Park as a prelude to San Francisco's Summer of Love, a symbol of American counterculture, and involved chanting of "Om" by Allen Ginsberg, a follower of Hinduism.

In the 1970s, Maharishi Mahesh Yogi developed a popular meditation technique, the Transcendental Meditation (TM), and became known as the "Guru" who brought meditation to America. In 1974, Alfred Ford, the great-grandson of Henry Ford, joined ISKCON and helped establish the first Hindu temple in Hawaii and the Bhakti Vedanta Cultural Centre in Detroit. Other influential Indians of Hindu faith in the counter-culture movement are Mata Amritanandamayi and Sri Chinmoy.

== Demographics ==
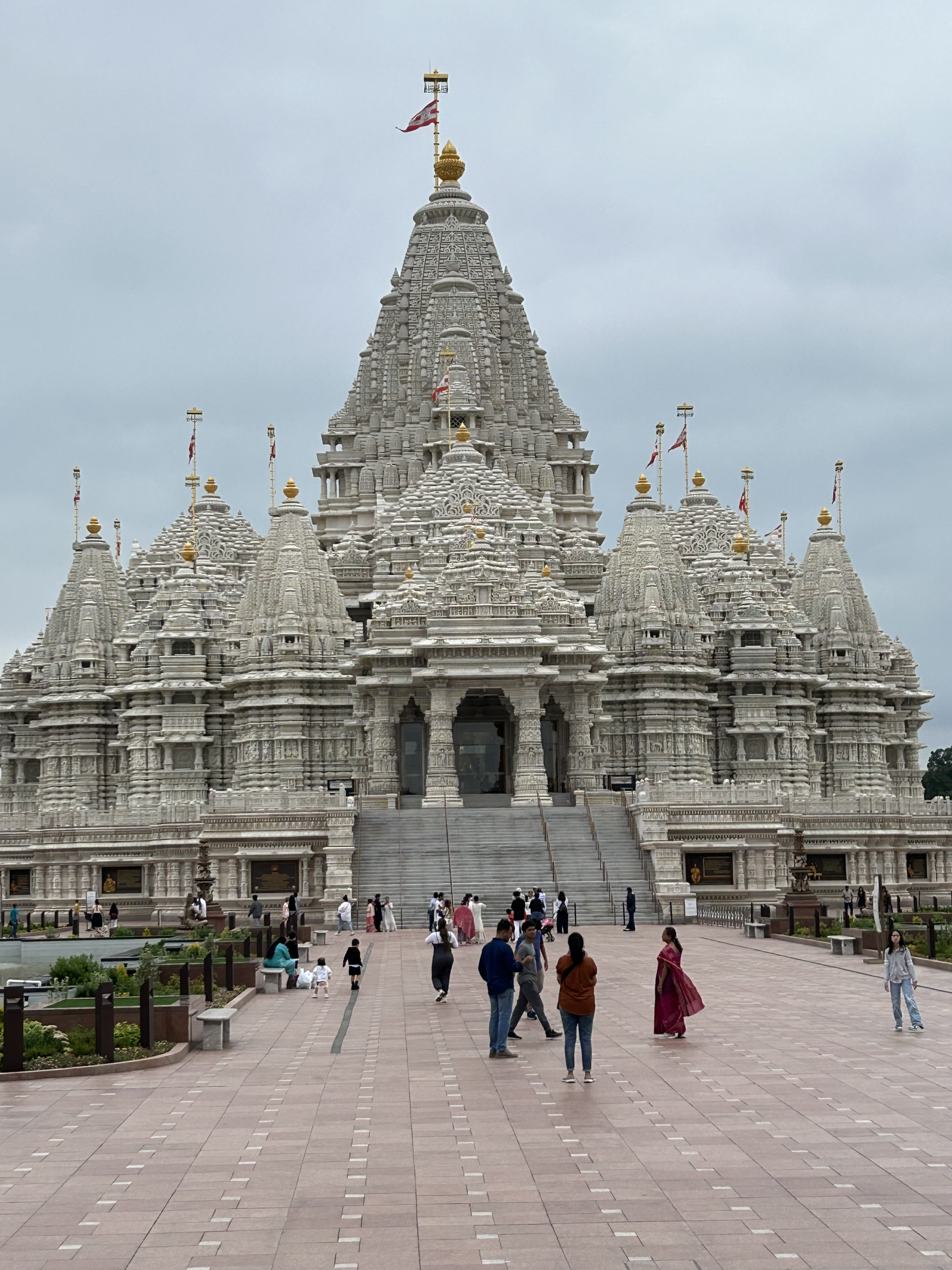
Hindu BAPS Temple in Robbinsville, New Jersey

According to the 2023–24 Pew Research Center Religious Landscape Study, Hindus comprise approximately 0.9% of the U.S. adult population, increased from 0.4% in 2007. The Hindu population of the United States is the eighth-largest in the world. Most Hindus in the United States are of Asian Indian origin, and about 80% of Asian Indian immigrants practice Hinduism. The US Hindu population has been growing over the recent decades. In a 2025 survey, The approximate Hindu population in the US in 2025 is around 3.6 million and 84% of Hindus reported their ethnic origin from Asian countries.

Earlier in a 2015 survey, most Hindus in America were immigrants (87%) or the children of immigrants (9%), while the remaining were converts. The majority of Hindus are immigrants from South Asia. There are also Hindus from the Caribbean, Southeast Asia, Canada, Oceania, Africa, Europe and the Middle East. In the U.S. there are also about 900 ethnic Cham people from Vietnam, one of the few remaining non-Indic Hindus in the world, 55% of whom are Hindus.

From 2008 to 2017, around 90000 Hindu Bhutanese refugees were resettled in the United States. Earlier in 1988, a census in Bhutan resulted in ethnic and linguistic tensions against the Nepali-speaking Hindu Lhotshampa ethnic group, leading to them becoming Bhutanese refugees in Nepal. Many Afghan Hindus have also settled in United States, mainly after Soviet–Afghan War and the rise of the Taliban. A number of Hindu-Americans immigrated twice, first from former British colonies of East Africa, the Caribbean, Fiji to the United Kingdom, and then to the United States.

According to the Association of Statisticians of American Religious Bodies, in 2017 Hindus were the largest minority religion in 92 of the 3143 counties in the US. Although Hinduism is practiced mainly by people of South Asian descent, a sizable number of Hindus in United States are converts to Hinduism. According to the Pew Research Center, 9% of Hindus in United States belong to a non-Asian ethnicity: White (4%), Black (2%), Latino (1%) and mixed (2%).

As per the 2020 census, the median age of Hindus in the United States was 36 years, which is lower than the national average of 47 years. Hindus are the second youngest religious group, after Muslims (33 years). While as per 2023, the median age of Hindus have increased to 42 years.

=== Education and income ===
American Hindus have the highest rates of educational attainment and highest household income among all religious communities, and the lowest divorce rates. In 2008, according to Pew Research Center, 80% of American adults who were raised as Hindus continued to adhere to Hinduism, which is the highest retention rate for any religion in America.

Due to the U.S. immigration policies, most of the Hindu immigrants have been educated and highly skilled professionals, most likely to hold college degrees.

Historically, some notable Hindus came to America for education in the late 19th and 20th centuries. Anandibai Joshi is believed to be the first Hindu woman to set foot on American soil, arriving in New York in June 1883 at the age of 19, graduating with a medical degree from the Women's Medical College of Pennsylvania in March 1886, becoming the first female of South Asian origin to graduate with a degree in Western medicine in the United States.

=== Religiosity ===
According to a 2014 Pew Research survey, 88% of the American Hindu population believed in God (versus 89% of adults overall). However, only 26% believed that religion is very important in their life. About 51% of the Hindu population reported praying daily.

According to the Pew Research Center, only 15% of the Americans identified the Vedas as a Hindu religious text. Roughly half of Americans knew that yoga has roots in Hinduism.

== Socio-cultural engagement ==
=== Adaption to American culture ===
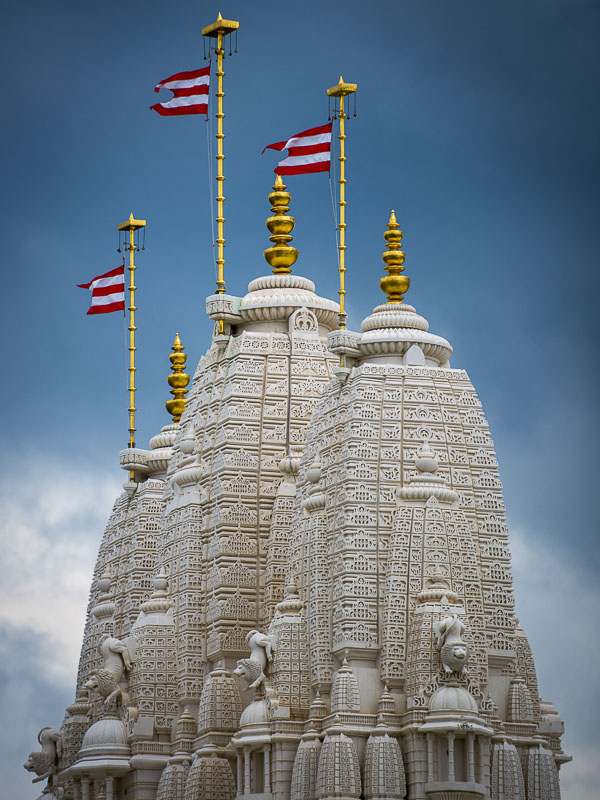
Red & White BAPS Flags atop Hindu Temple in Lilburn, Georgia

Many of the early Hindu emissaries to the United States drew on ideological confluences between Christian and Hindu universalism. Hindu temples in the United States tend to house more than one deity corresponding with a different tradition, unlike those in India which tend to house deities from a single tradition. Yoga become part of many American's lifestyle, but its meaning has shifted. While Hindus in the United States may refer to the practice as a form of meditation that has different forms (i.e. karma yoga, bhakti yoga, kriya yoga), it is used in reference to the physical aspect of the word.

=== Influence on American culture and beliefs ===
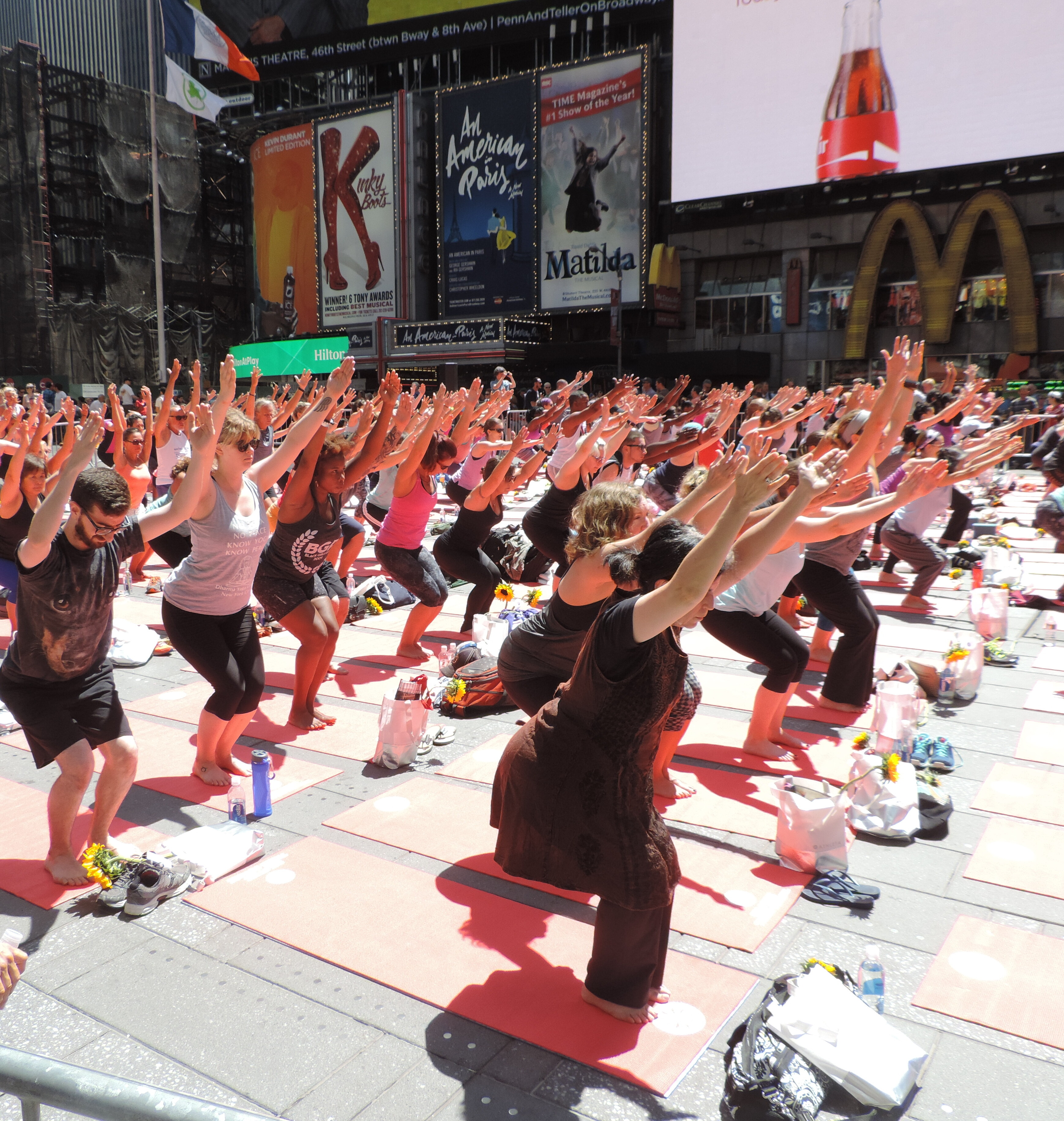
Yoga at Times Square, New York City in 2015

In 1966 B.K.S. Iyengar’s "Light on Yoga" was published in the United States, where it became a guide for yoga asana practice, and Iyengar was invited to teach Yoga in US. In 1975, the first issue of "Yoga Journal" was published, which has since become the magazine of record for Yoga in America. By 2016, according to an Ipsos study, 36.7 million Americans were practicing yoga.

The principle of reincarnation, which is an integral part of Hinduism and other Dharmic religions, has been increasingly accepted with around one-third of Americans believing in re-birth including 29% of American Christians. The Pew survey of 2018 found increasing influence of “New Age” beliefs such as reincarnation, and the presence of spiritual energy in physical objects like mountains or trees, with 33% of Americans believing in reincarnation. The practice of vegetarianism, often associated with Hinduism, is also gaining acceptance, though mainly for health reasons.

In the 1980s, Deepak Chopra, a medical doctor of Hindu background, established an Ayurvedic holistic health center, which also conducted TM meditation sessions. In 1990s, Chopra gained recognition for his books on Mind-Body health such as Quantum Healing and Perfect Health, along with his appearances on The Oprah Winfrey Show. In 2009, Lisa Miller, a Wilbur honored American writer and journalist noted the contemporary influence of ancient Hindu concepts of religious pluralism: "Truth is One, but the sages speak of it by many names", and "there are many paths to God".

In 2016, Sadhguru, an Indian guru of Hindu heritage, published a spiritual self-help book, Inner Engineering: A Yogi's Guide to Joy, which became a New York Times bestseller. Around 2020, Sadhguru traveled across America, addressing audiences and gaining celebrity followers such as Will Smith and Matthew McConaughey. Sadhguru has since raised awareness of Yoga, environment, and spiritual principles such as "karma" in talks with multiple American podcasters, including Joe Rogan.

=== Social views ===
In 2019, a Pew survey noted that 71% of Hindus believed that homosexuality should be accepted, which is higher than the general public (62%). The same study also said that about 68% of Hindus supported same-sex marriage, vs. 53% of the general public. The 2019 Pew survey also noted that Hindus in the United States support abortion rights (68%). Further, the same survey indicated that about 69% of Hindus supported regulations to protect the environment and nature.

=== Influence on pop culture ===
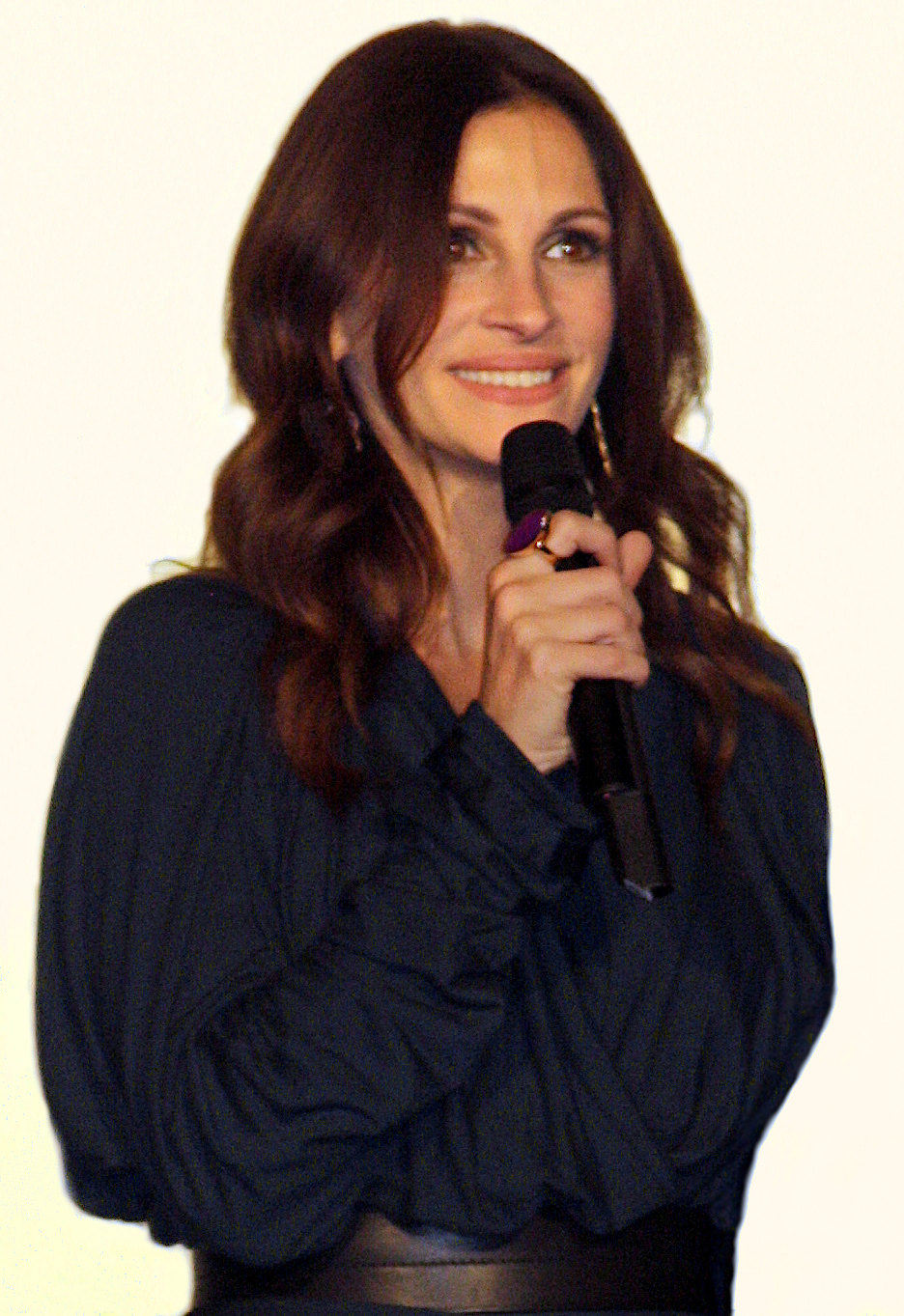
Julia Roberts at premiere of Eat Pray Love in 2010

Hinduism has influenced several Hollywood movies such as Eat Pray Love, which is a movie about a "modern American woman’s journey towards peace through Indian spiritual practices," including spending time at a Hindu ashram in India and practicing yoga. The science fiction Interstellar, directed by Christopher Nolan is considered to be inspired by the central notion of universal super-consciousness that transcends space and time from the ancient Indian philosophical texts, the Upanishads. Oppenheimer, a biographical thriller by Christopher Nolan based on the life of the American physicist who helped develop the first nuclear bomb, shows the lead character, J. Robert Oppenheimer, reading and quoting from Hindu religious texts such as the Bhagavad Gita.

Several Hollywood actors follow Hindu traditions, including Julia Roberts, who is a practicing Hindu and played the role of a spiritual seeker in Eat, Pray, Love. Hugh Jackman, Shawn Mendes, and Vin Diesel hold the Bhagavad Gita in high regard. Actor Will Smith is also known to follow Hindu rituals including a visit to India and participating in Ganga aarti prayer.

=== Celebration of Hindu festivals ===
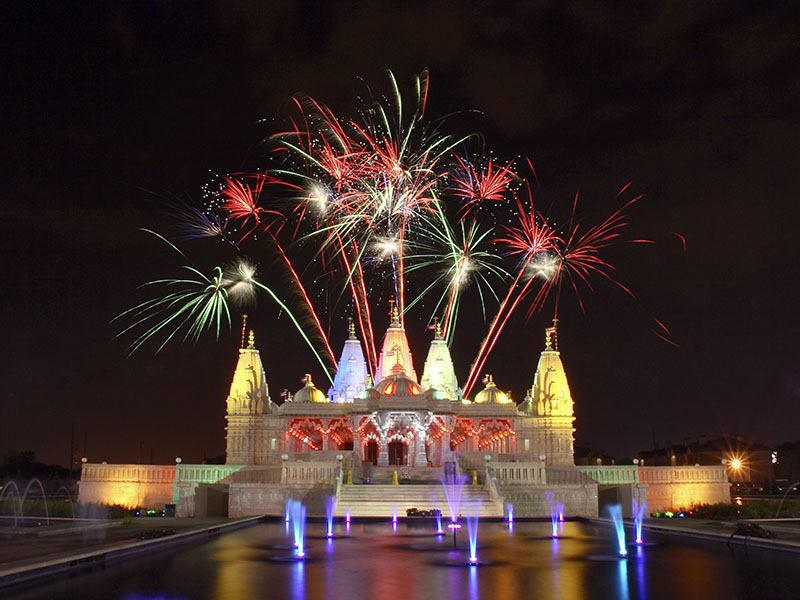
Diwali celebration at Hindu BAPS Temple in Houston

The Hindu festival of Diwali is widely celebrated across the United States and has become an official holiday in three states (California, Connecticut and Pennsylvania) as of 2025. In 2025, Connecticut governor Ned Lamont proclaimed the 15th day of the month of Kartik in the Hindu lunar calendar, which typically occurs between October and November, as an annual Diwali holiday. New York City public schools also recognize Diwali as a holiday. In October 2025, President Trump held a Diwali celebration in the White House by lighting a candle along with Indian-American CEOs from Adobe, IBM, and Micron, while also joined by several administration officials.

Some states, such as New Jersey and Ohio, have recognized October as Hindu Heritage Month. In 2025, the state of Illinois proclaimed the month of October as "Hindu American" Heritage Month.

== Hindu-Americans in politics ==
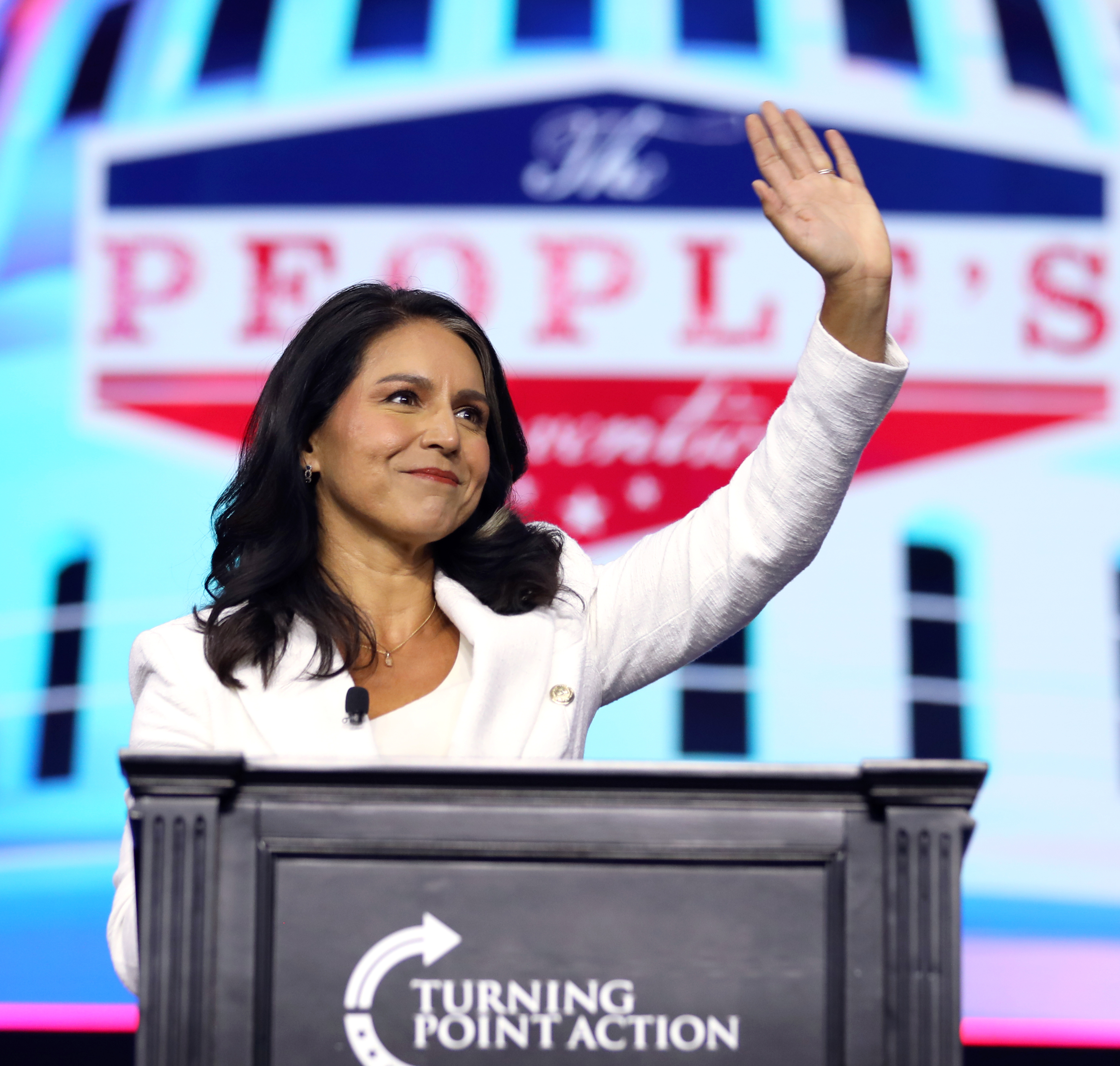
Tulsi Gabbard at People's Convention 2024

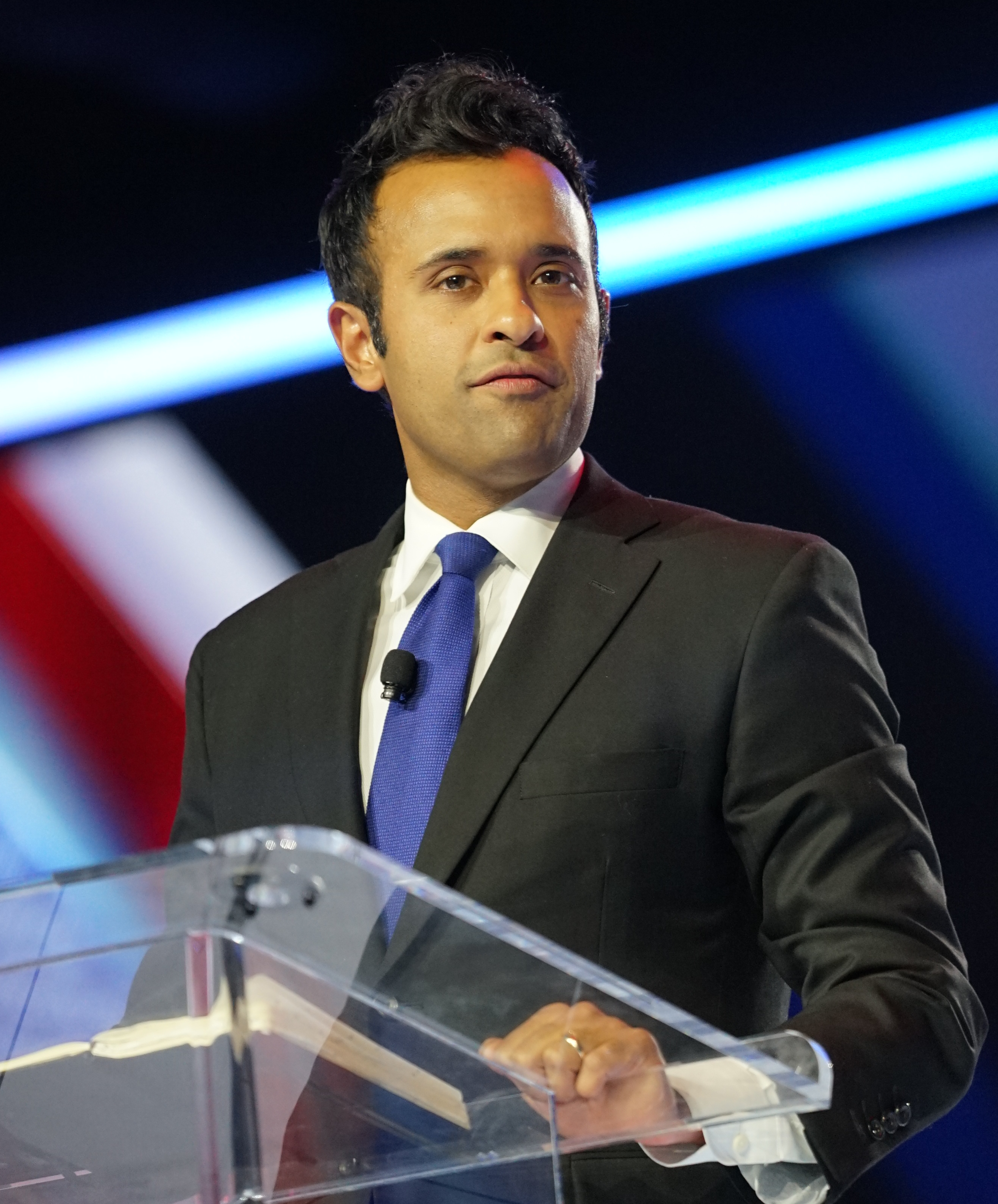
Vivek Ramaswamy at America-Fest 2025

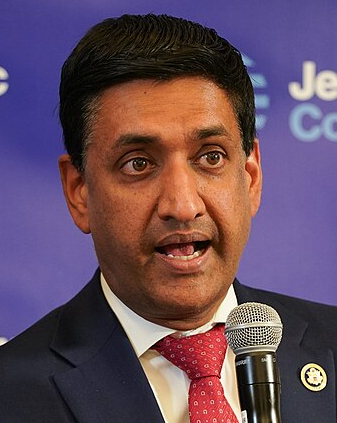
Ro Khanna at JDCA Summit 2024

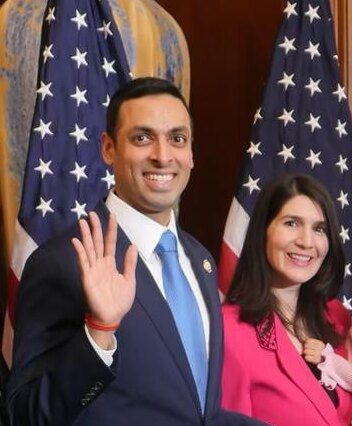
Suhas Subramanyam with wife at DC in 2025

Hindu Americans have participated in political and civic activism in the United States, including through organizations mobilizing around domestic and foreign-policy issues. Hindu Americans have been elected or appointed to public office at various levels of government. Their political views are diverse and span the political spectrum, including participation in both the Democratic and Republican parties. Prominent Hindu-American political figures have included Dalip Singh Saund, Bobby Jindal, Nikki Haley, and Ro Khanna, who have been associated with the Democratic and Republican parties and have held or sought office at the federal and state levels. Hindu religious traditions have also gained visibility at the White House, where presidents have hosted Diwali celebrations and participated in Hindu religious customs, including the lighting of a diya. In September 2000, a joint session of Congress was opened with a prayer in Sanskrit (with some Hindi and English added), by Venkatachalapathi Samudrala to honor the visit of Indian Prime Minister Atal Bihari Vajpayee. The gesture was an initiative by Ohio Congressman Sherrod Brown, who requested the U.S. Congress House Chaplain to invite the Hindu priest from the Shiva Vishnu Hindu Temple in Parma, Ohio. A Hindu prayer was read in the Senate on July 12, 2007, by Rajan Zed, a Hindu priest from Nevada, who served as the Senate guest Chaplain. His prayer was interrupted by a couple and their daughter who claimed to be Christian patriots, which prompted a criticism of candidates in the upcoming presidential election for not condemning the interruption. In October 2009, President Barack Obama lit a ceremonial Diwali lamp at the White House to symbolize victory of light over darkness.

In April 2009, President Obama appointed Anju Bhargava, a management consultant and pioneer community builder, to serve as a member of his inaugural Advisory Council on Faith Based and Neighborhood Partnership. In collaboration with the White House, Hindu American Seva Communities was formed to bring the Hindu seva voices to the forefront in the public arena and to bridge the gap between U.S. government and Hindu people and places of worship.

In the 2020 elections, Tulsi Gabbard became the first Hindu to run in the presidential race from Democratic Party, though later she endorsed Joe Biden. In 2021, the State of New Jersey joined with the World Hindu Council to declare October as Hindu Heritage Month.

Vivek Ramaswamy, a Hindu of Indian background ran for the position of president in the 2024 elections from Republican Party, though he later endorsed Donald Trump.

In 2025, Tulsi Gabbard was sworn in as the Director of National Intelligence taking the role of President Donald Trump's top intelligence adviser, and became the first Hindu American to hold a Cabinet-level position.

=== In the U.S. Government ===
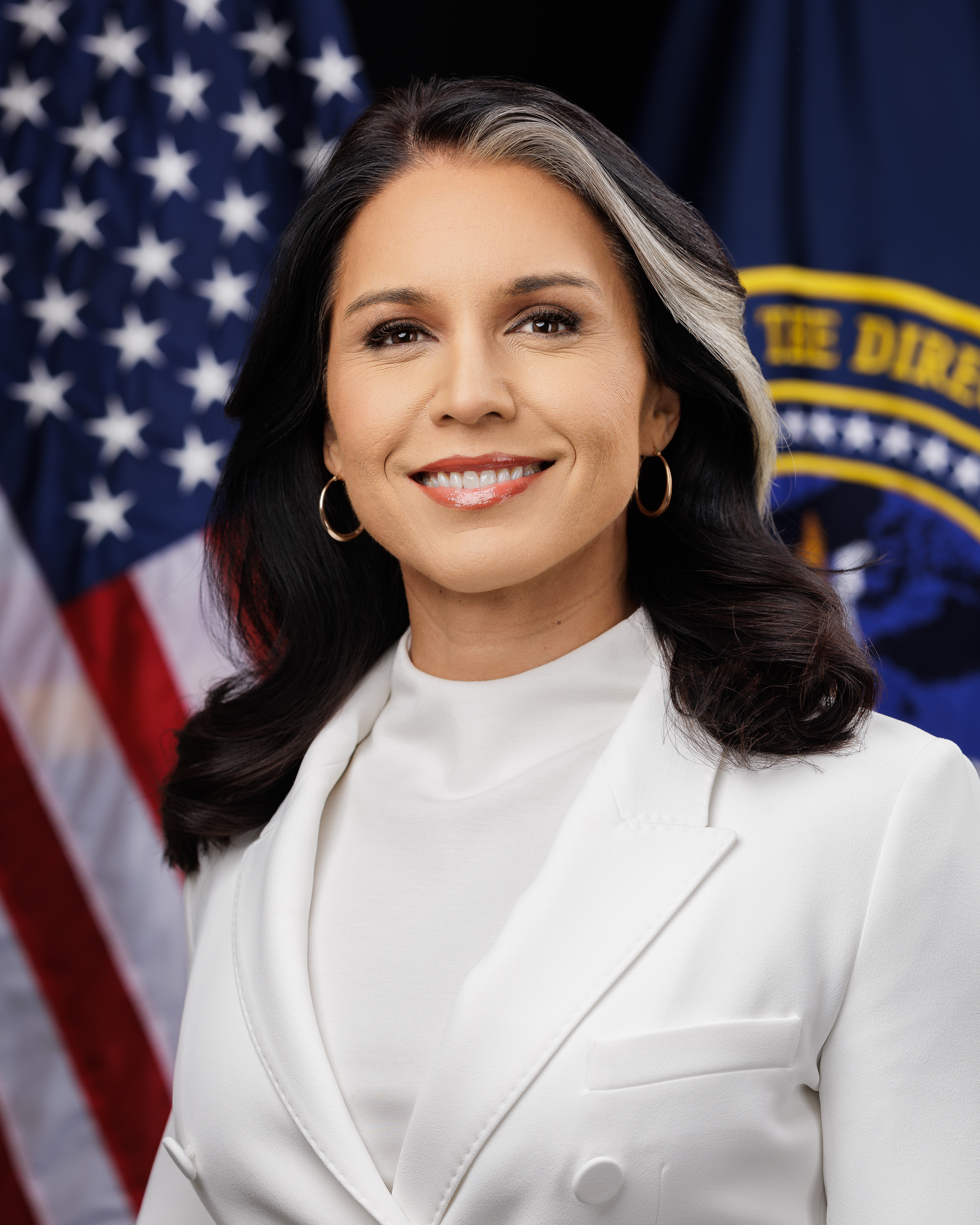
Tulsi Gabbard appointed as DNI, 2025.

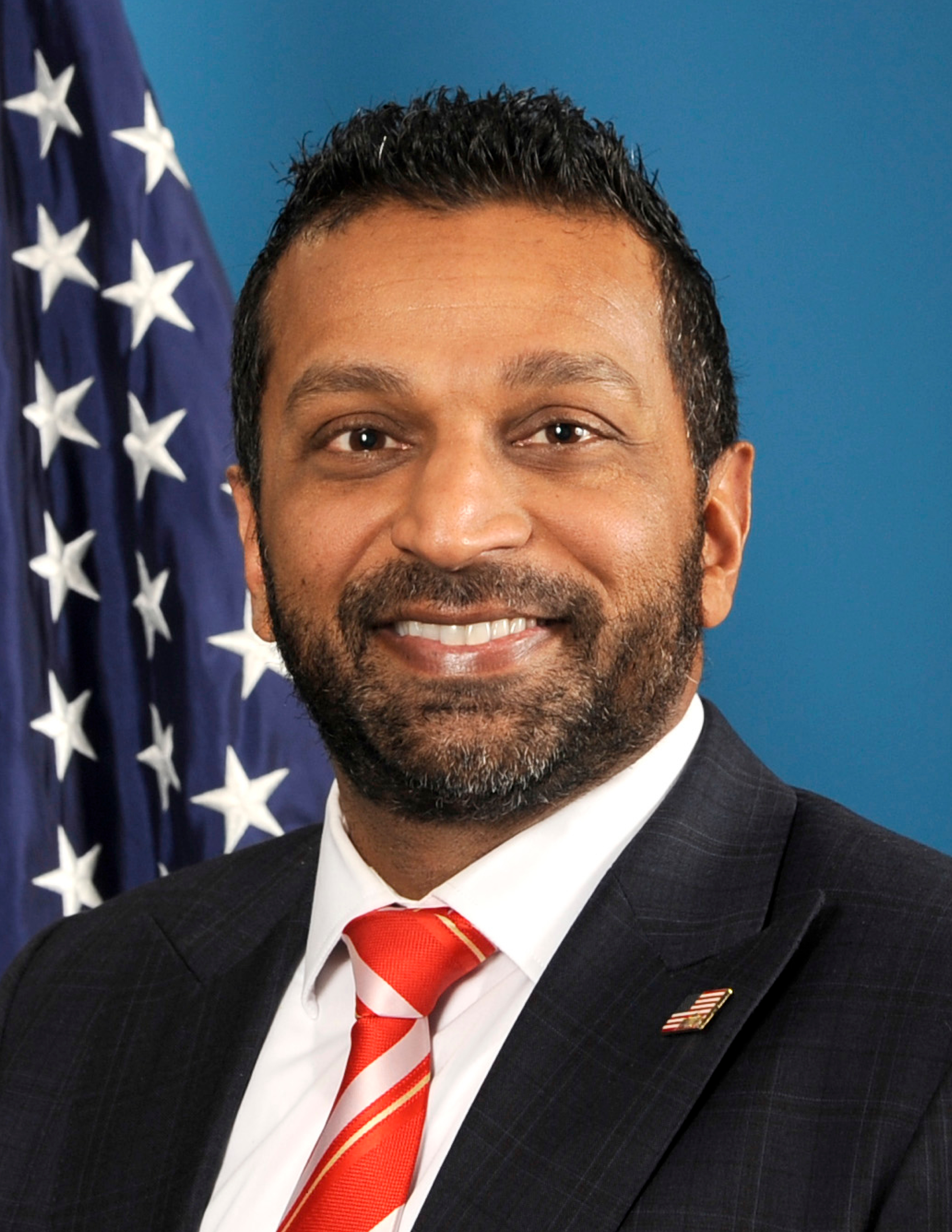
Kash Patel appointed as FBI Director, 2025

==== U.S. Cabinet ====
- Kash Patel (R), Director of the FBI

==== U.S. Congress ====
In the 119th US Congress, there are four Hindu Congressmen (0.8% of total).

- Ro Khanna (D)
- Raja Krishnamoorthi (D)
- Shri Thanedar (D)
- Suhas Subramanyam (D)

==== Other prominent positions ====
- Vivek Murthy (D), Surgeon General of the United States
- Usha Chilukuri Vance (R), Second Lady of the United States

==== State legislators ====
- Padma Kuppa (D), Michigan House of Representatives
- Sarbjeet S. Kumar (R), Tennessee House of Representatives

== Hindu-Americans in business and entrepreneurship ==
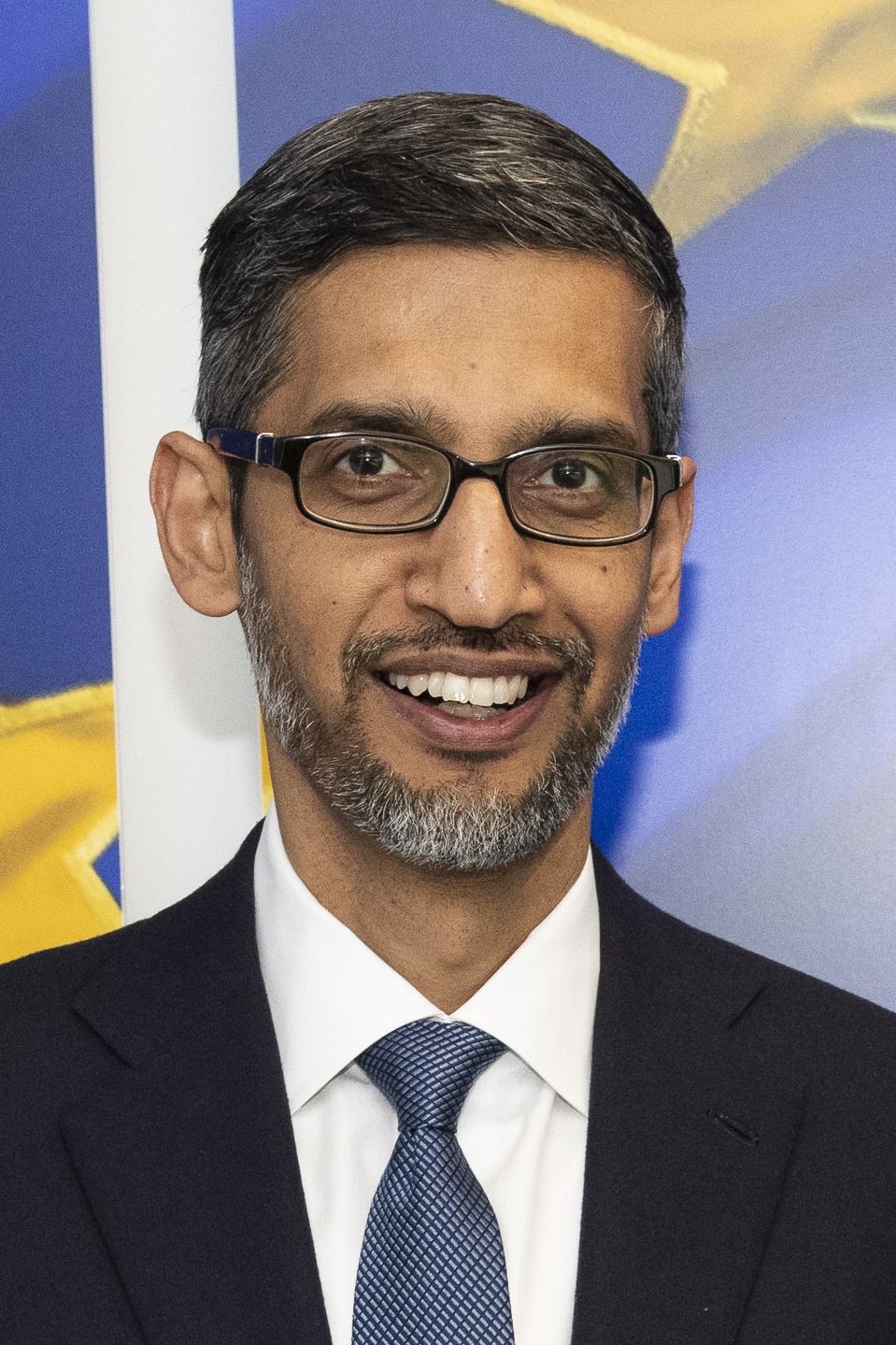
Sundar Pichai, CEO of Google

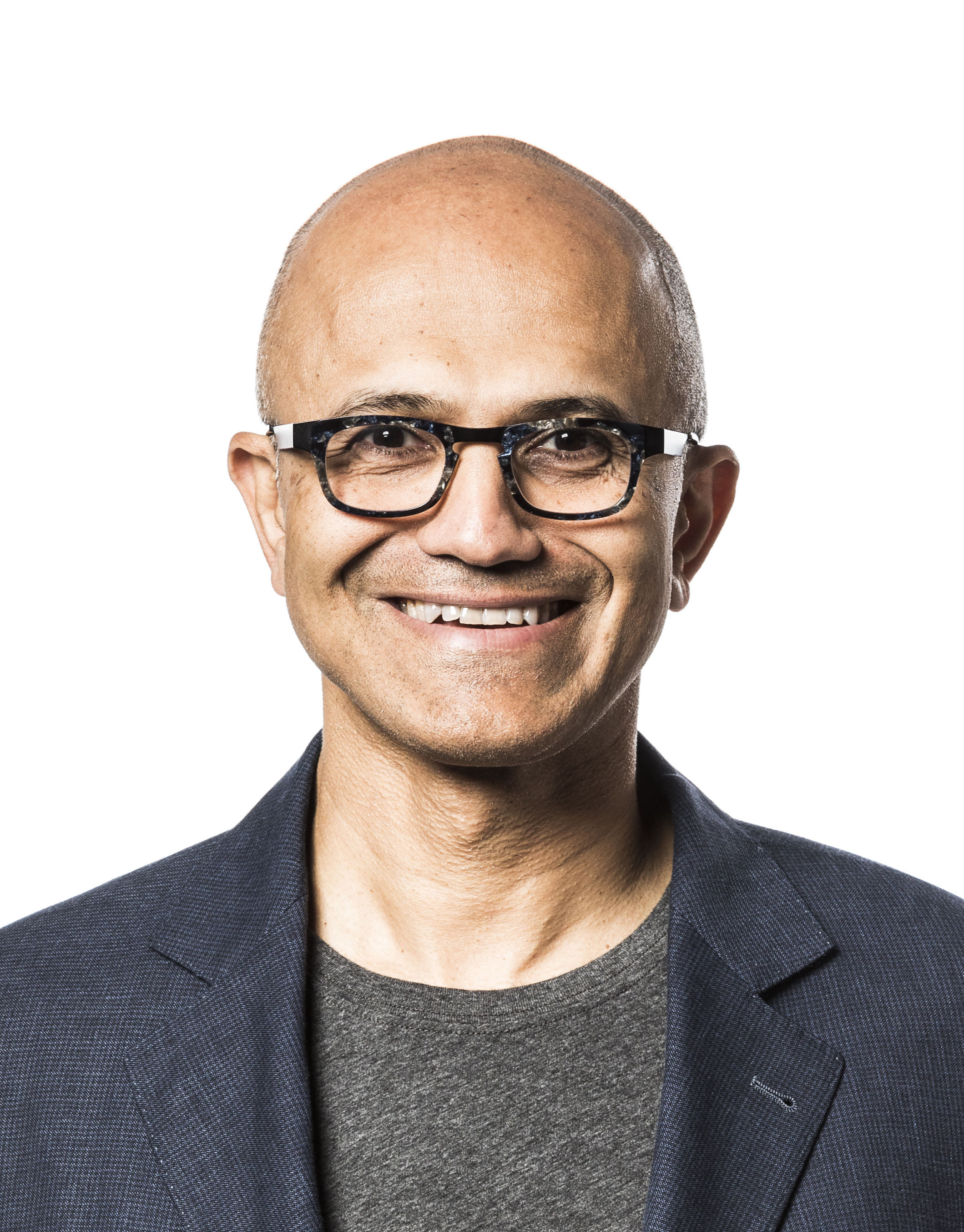
Satya Nadella, chairman and CEO of Microsoft

Hindu Americans have established presence in American business and entrepreneurship, particularly in technology, medicine, finance, hospitality, and professional services. Indian Americans, the majority of whom are Hindu, have also been prominent among entrepreneurs and executives in the U.S. technology sector, including leaders such as Sundar Pichai, Satya Nadella, Vinod Khosla, Arvind Krishna, Shantanu Narayen and Rakesh Gangwal. Academic research has linked Indian-American economic success to high levels of educational attainment, professional employment, entrepreneurship, and transnational business networks.

== Hindu-Americans in science, medicine, and academia ==
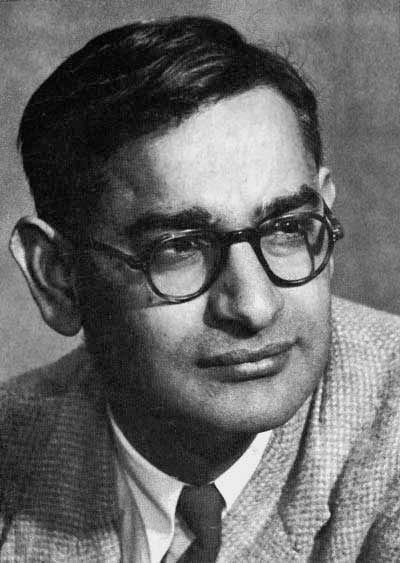
Har Gobind Khorana, Nobel Prize-winning biochemist

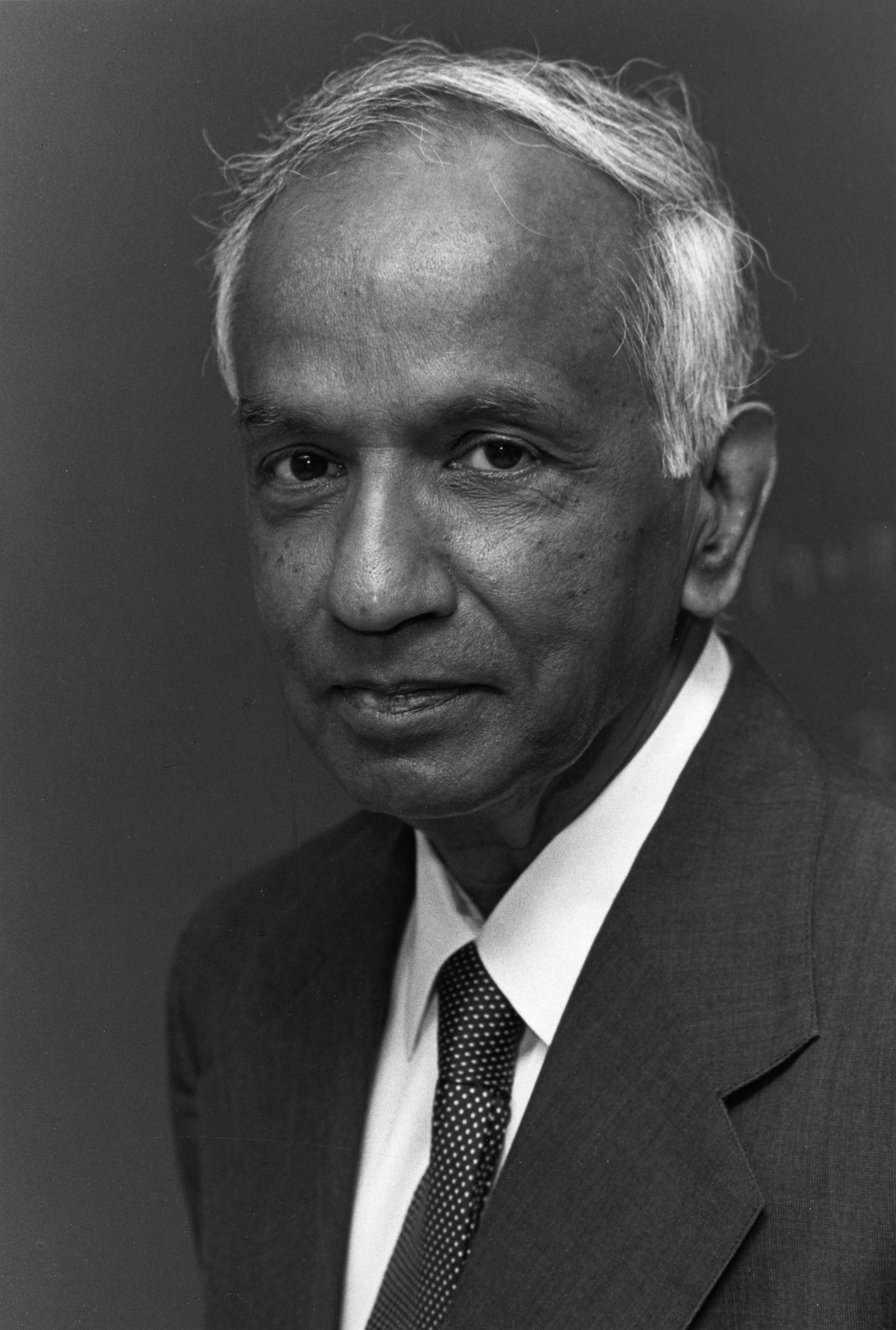
Subrahmanyan Chandrasekhar, Nobel Prize-winning astrophysicist

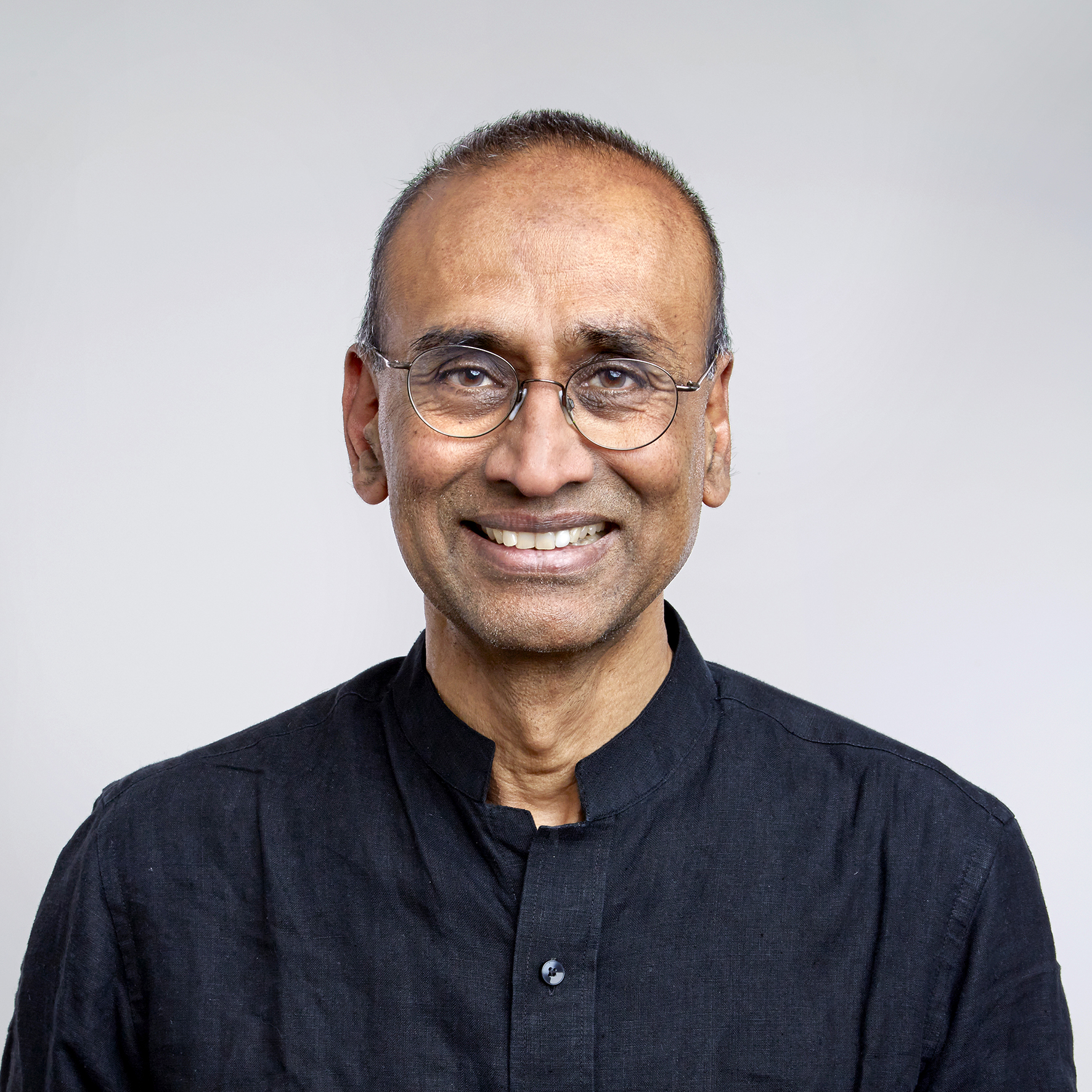
Venkatraman Ramakrishnan, Nobel Prize-winning structural biologist

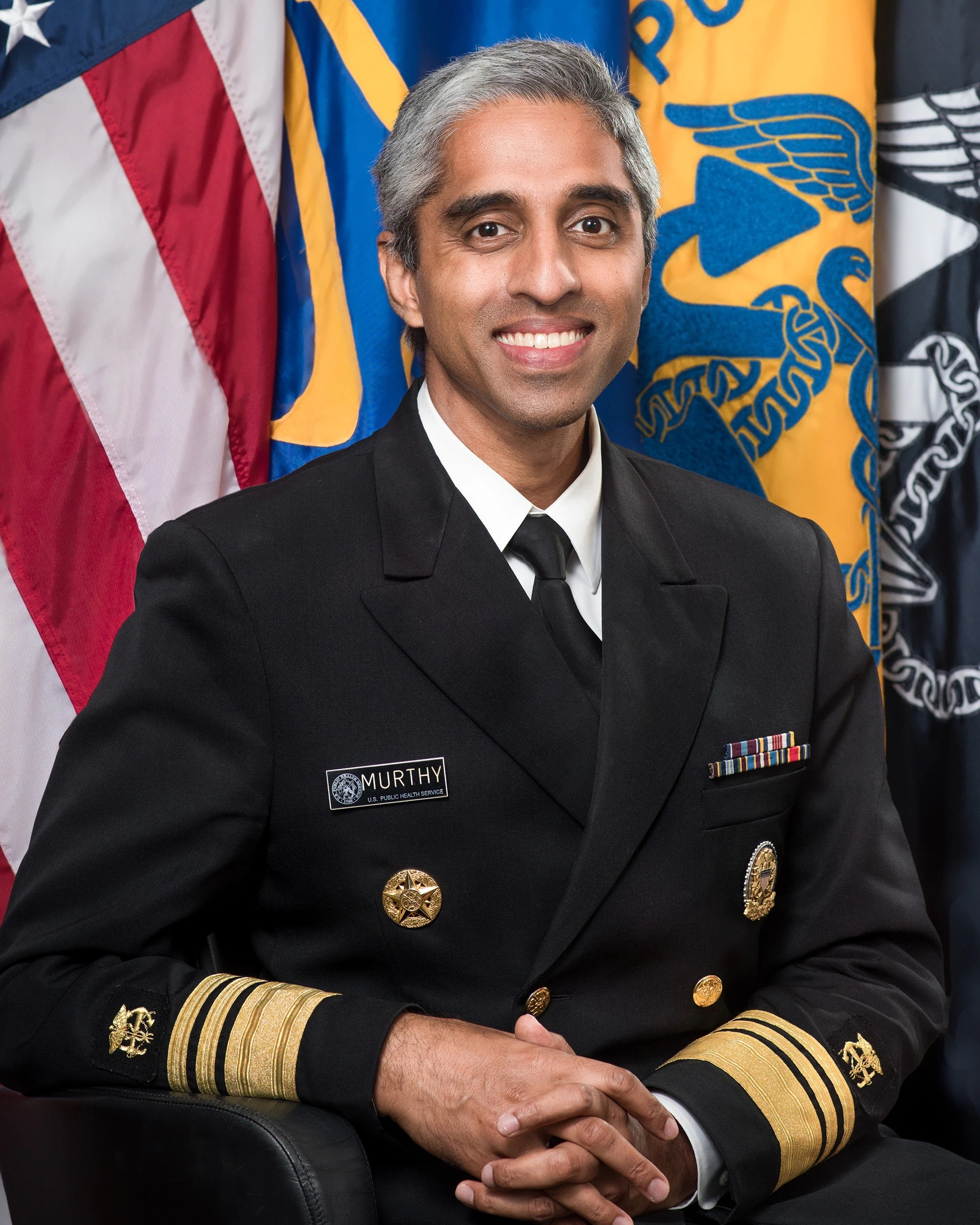
Vivek Murthy, former U.S. Surgeon General

Indian Americans have established a significant presence in science, technology, engineering, mathematics, and medicine in the United States. Notable figures include Har Gobind Khorana, who received the 1968 Nobel Prize in Physiology or Medicine and conducted research at the University of Wisconsin–Madison and the Massachusetts Institute of Technology. Subrahmanyan Chandrasekhar, who received the 1983 Nobel Prize in Physics for his theoretical studies of the physical processes important to the structure and evolution of stars and spent most of his academic career at the University of Chicago. Venkatraman Ramakrishnan, who received the 2009 Nobel Prize in Chemistry for studies of the structure and function of the ribosome, and Vivek Murthy, who served as the 19th and 21st Surgeon General of the United States and as Vice Admiral in the U.S. Public Health Service.

== Hindu temples in America ==
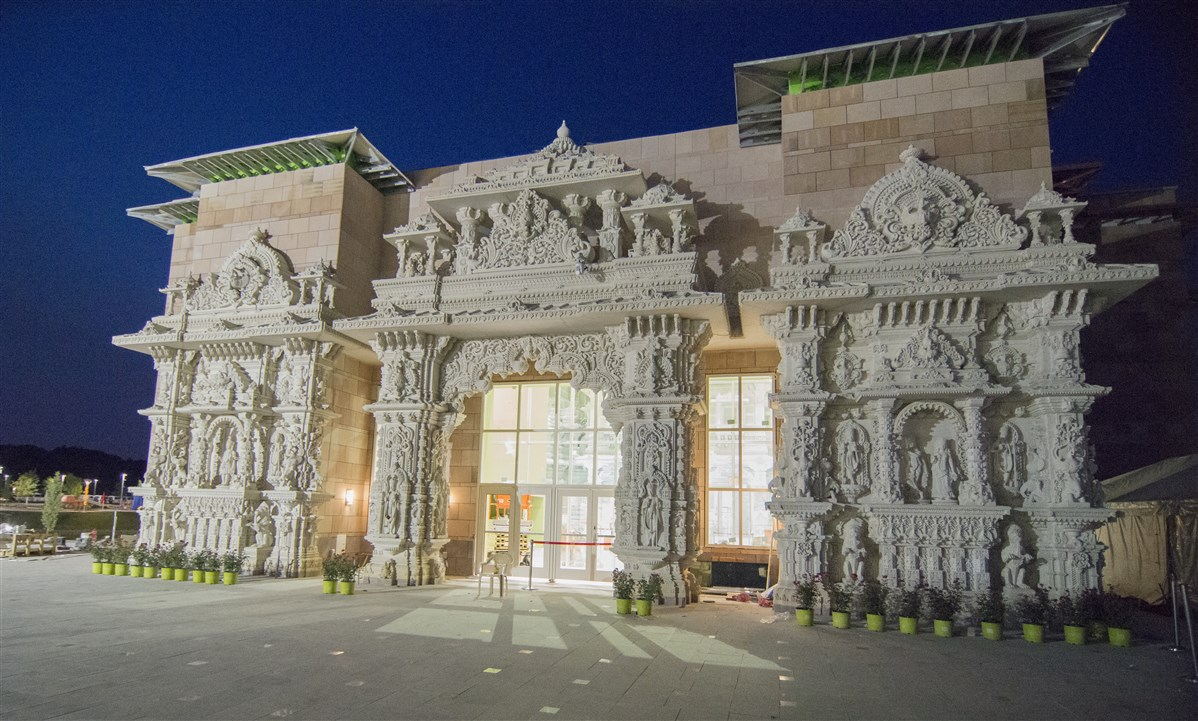
BAPS Mandir in Robbinsville, NJ

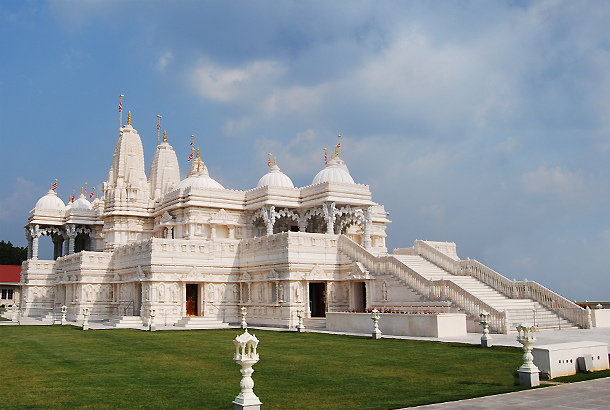
BAPS Mandir, at Atlanta

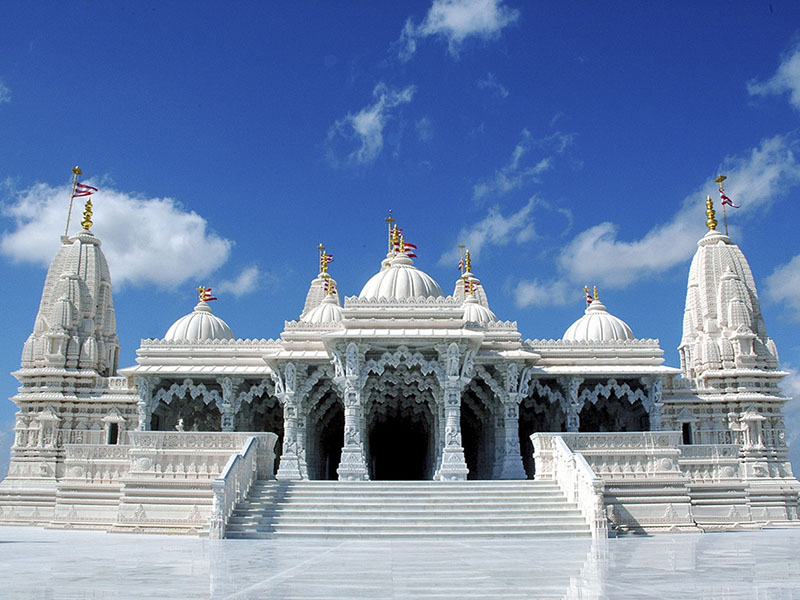
BAPS Mandir, in Houston

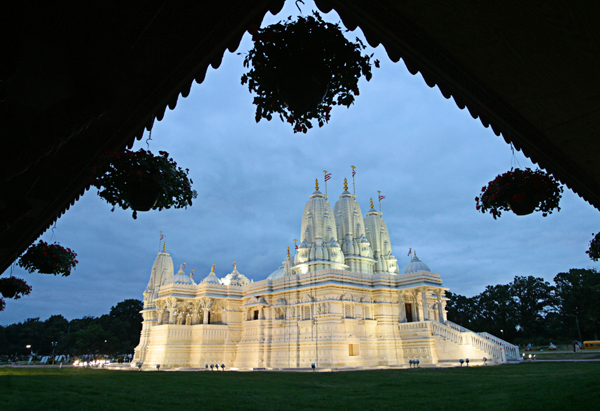
BAPS Mandir, at Chicago

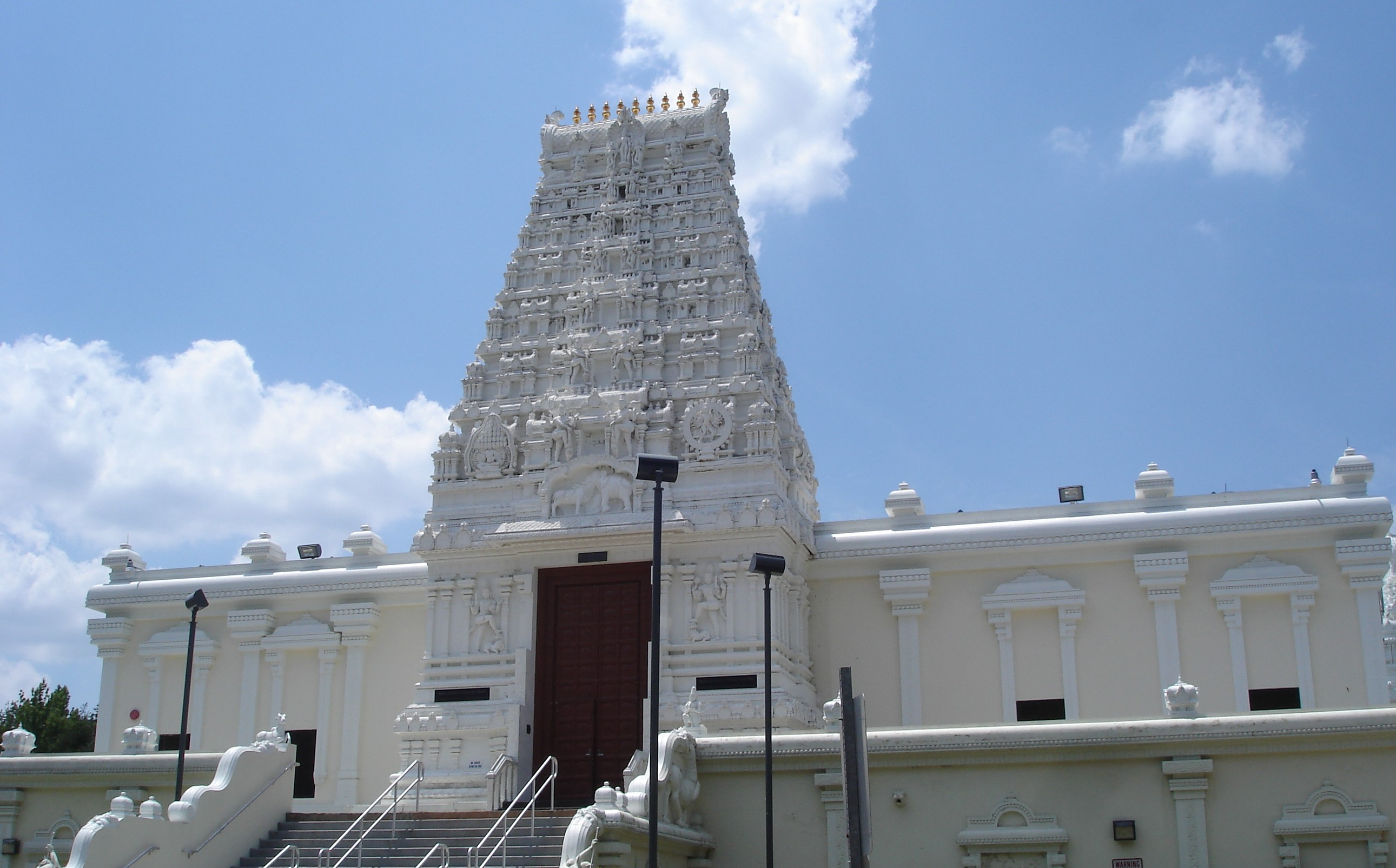
Sri Siva Vishnu Temple in Lanham, Maryland

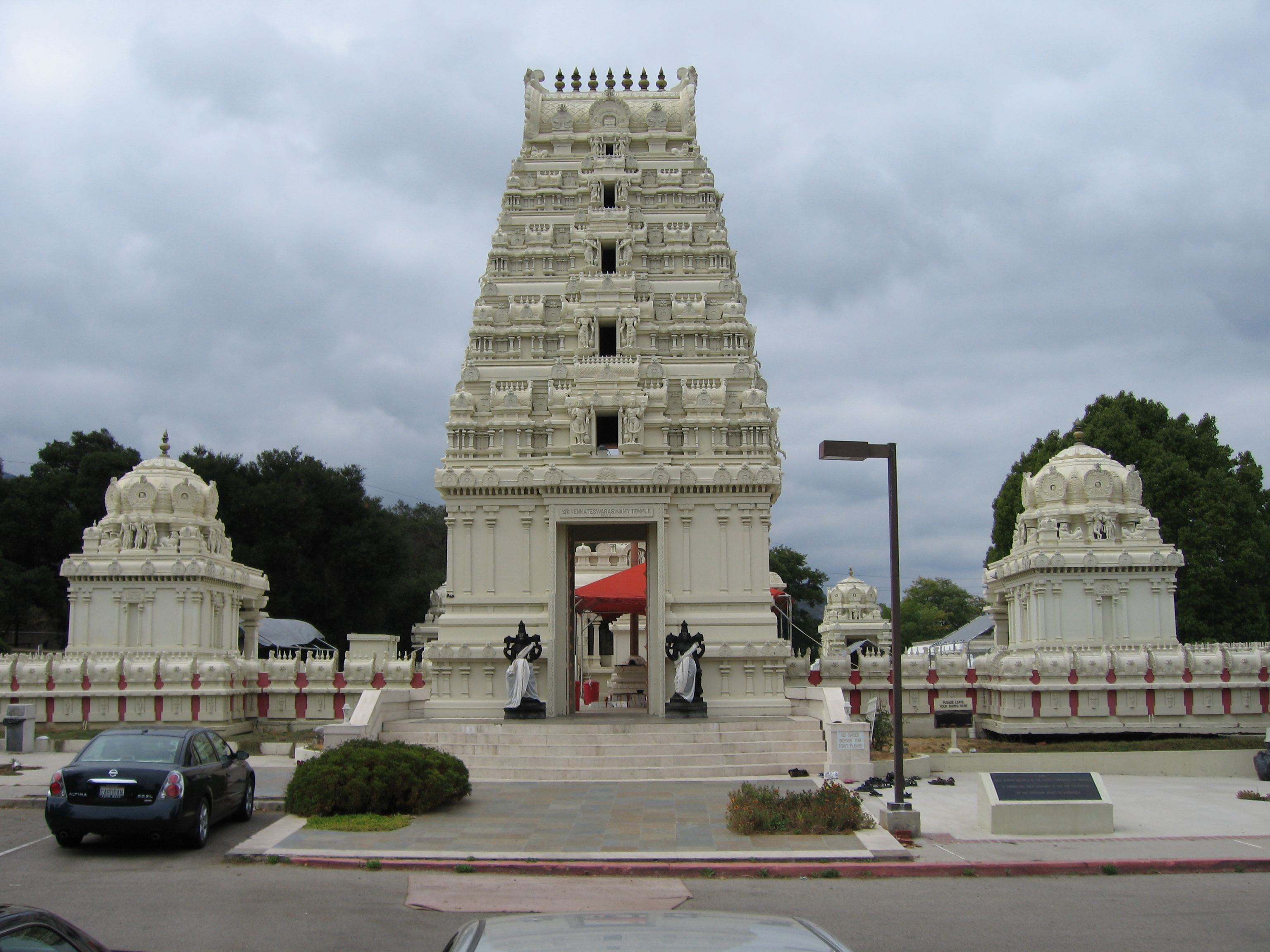
Malibu Hindu Temple near Malibu, California

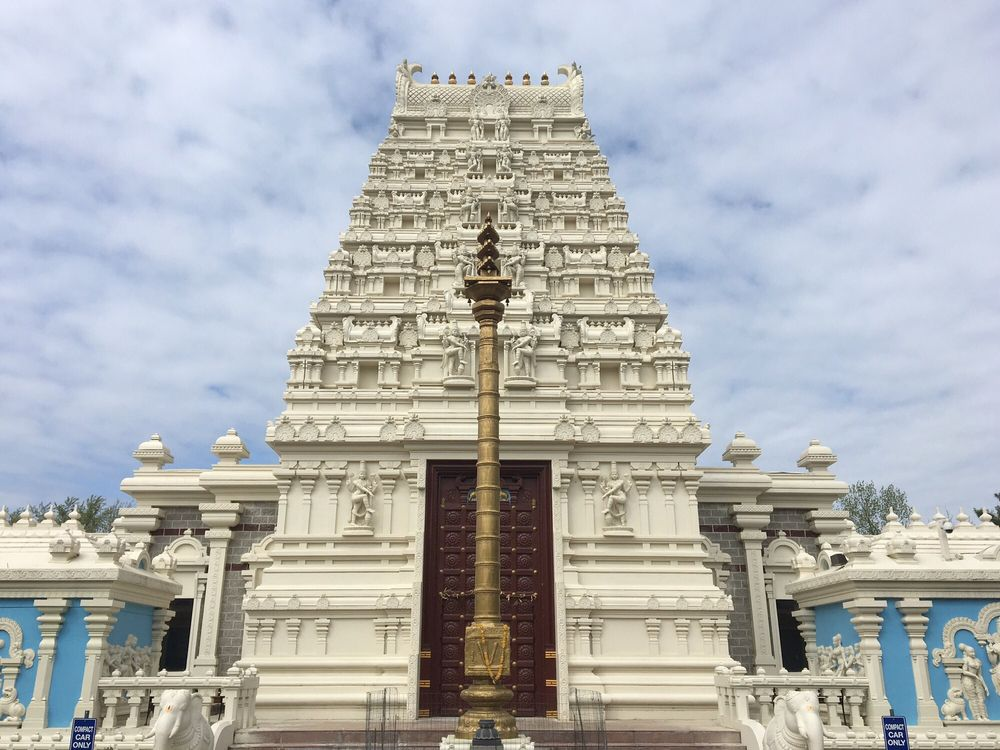
Hindu Temple of St. Louis, Missouri

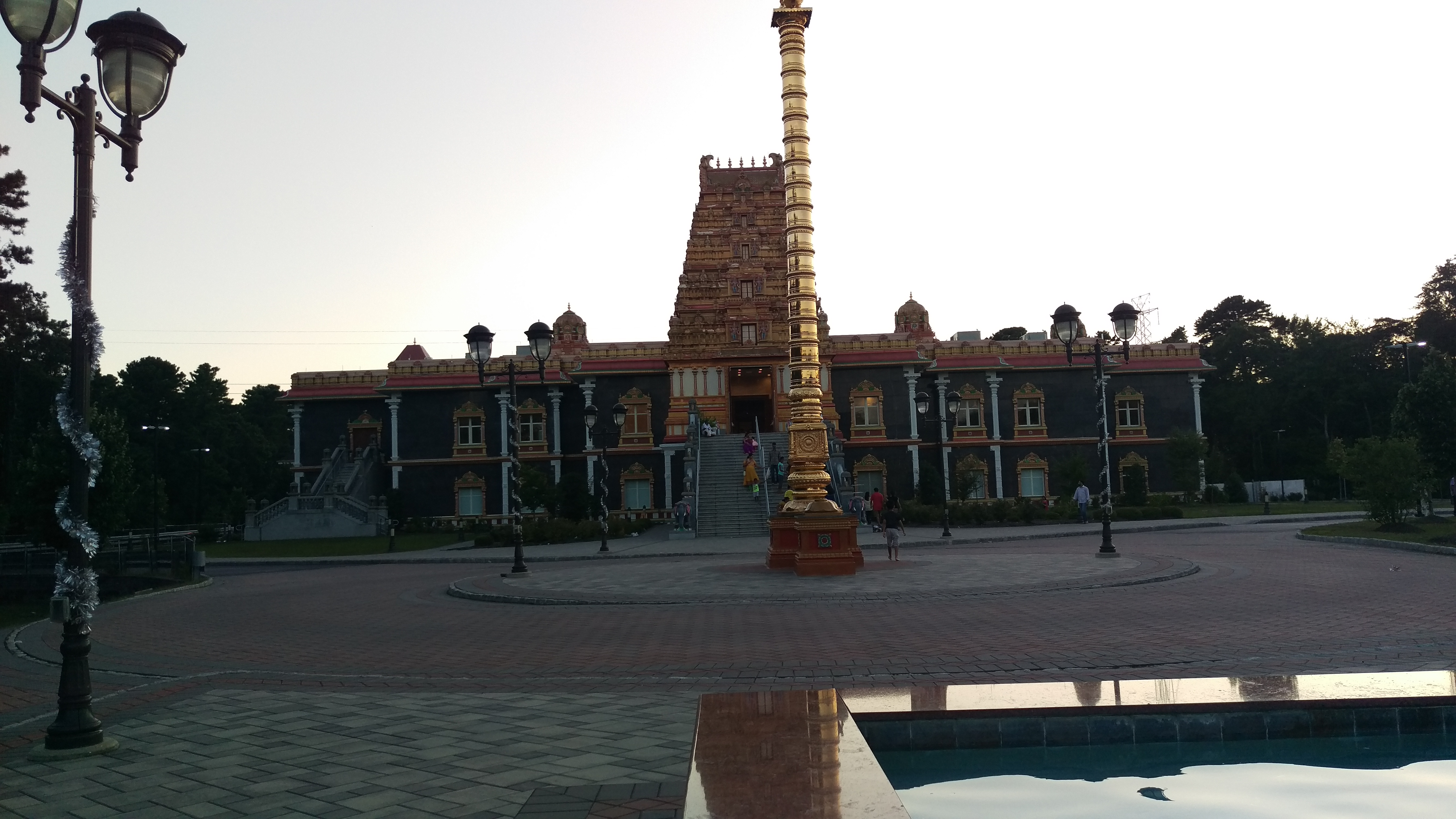
Sri Guruvaayoorappan Temple in Morganville, NJ

The Vedanta Society was responsible for building the earliest temples in the United States, starting in 1905 with the Old Temple in San Francisco, but they were not considered formal temples. The earliest traditional mandir in the United States is Shiva Kartikeya Temple in Concord, California. It was built in 1957 and is known as Palanisamy Temple. It is one of the few temples run by public elected members. The Maha Vallabha Ganapathi Devastanam, owned by the Hindu Temple Society of North America in Flushing, New York, was consecrated on July 4, 1977. It is estimated that there are over 1,000 Hindu temples across the United States.

The oldest Hindu temple in Texas is the Shree Raseshwari Radha Rani temple at Radha Madhav Dham, Austin. The temple was established by Jagadguru Shree Kripaluji Maharaj. It is one of the largest Hindu temple complexes in the Western Hemisphere, and the largest in North America. Swaminarayan Akshardham in Robbinsville, New Jersey, is one of the largest stone Hindu temples in the United States.

In 2010, the Bharatiya Temple of Northwest Indiana temple was opened next to the Indian American Cultural Center in Merrillville, Indiana. The Bharatiya Temple allows four different Hindu groups as well as a Jain group to worship together.

The Sri Ganesha Temple of Alaska in Anchorage, Alaska, is the northernmost Hindu temple in the world.

== Discrimination and biases ==
=== Early immigration struggles ===
As a result of the Bellingham Riots in Bellingham, Washington, on September 5, 1907, some 125 Indians (mostly Sikhs but labelled as Hindus) were driven out of town by a mob of 400-500 white men. Some victims of the riots migrated to Everett, Washington, where they received similar treatment two months later. Riots occurred during this period in Vancouver, British Columbia, and California.

In the 1923 case United States v. Bhagat Singh Thind, the Supreme Court ruled that Thind and other South Asians were not "free white persons" according to a 1790 federal law that stated that only white immigrants could apply for naturalized citizenship. The Immigration Act of 1924 prohibited the immigration of Asians such as Middle Easterners and Indians.

The first wave of South Asian immigrants in America was predominantly Punjabi Sikhs, who migrated to the West Coast in the early 20th century due to economic hardships in India. They typically labored in agriculture, railroads, and lumber yards, establishing communities and the first Sikh temple in California by 1912. In the early 1900s, White Americans labeled all South Asian immigrants “Hindoos,” regardless of their religion, labeling them as an economic and cultural threat and leading to hostility, violent attacks, and forced expulsions by white workers in towns like Bellingham, Washington. Sentiments intensified through organizations like the Asiatic Exclusion League and widespread media portrayal of an alleged "Hindoo invasion."

=== Temple theft and vandalism ===
In February 2015, Hindu temples in Kent and the Seattle Metropolitan area were vandalized, and in April 2015, a Hindu temple in north Texas was vandalized with xenophobic images spray-painted on its walls. In January 2019, the Swaminarayan Temple in Kentucky was vandalized. Black paint was sprayed on the deity; the words "Jesus is the only God" and the Christian cross was spray painted on various walls.

Around 2022, there were several cases of vandalism of Hindu Temples in New York by Khalistan separatists, including the destruction of Mahatma Gandhi's statue outside Shri Tulsi Mandir in South Richmond Hill, New York, which was vandalized two times, first on August 3, 2022, and then on August 16, 2022, wherein 5-6 miscreants smashed the Gandhi statue with sledgehammers and spray painted Khalistan on the statue. In September 2022, a man named Sukhpal Singh was arrested and charged with a hate crime incident at the Hindu temple in Queens, New York, in which he destroyed the Gandhi statue and spray painted derogatory words.

In October 2023, there was a burglary at the Hari Om Radha Krishna Mandir in Sacramento, California, with six suspects stealing a donation box from the premises Some Hindu groups alleged that the theft was motivated by religious hate; the police have not arrested any suspects.

In January 2024, a Hindu temple in California was defaced with pro-Khalistan graffiti. In September 2024, the BAPS Shri Swaminarayan Mandir in Melville, New York was vandalized with anti-Hindu and anti-India graffiti. The incident drew condemnation from a bipartisan group of U.S lawmakers ahead of Indian Prime Minister Narendra Modi's visit to the country. Less than ten days later, another BAPS temple near Sacramento, California was vandalized for a second time and damage inflicted to a pipeline on the premises.

In March 2025, a BAPS Swaminarayan Mandir in Los Angeles was vandalised with anti-India messages, the local authorities classified the incident as a hate crime. In July 2025, ISKCON Sri Sri Radha Krishna Temple in Utah was struck with 20-30 gunshots over the span of several nights with devotees present inside the temple premises. The shooting caused structural damage to the temple and the Consulate General of India in San Francisco condemned the attack as a suspected hate crime. In August 2025, a BAPS Swaminarayan Mandir in Greenwood, Indiana was defaced with anti-India graffiti, the Hindu American Foundation described the attack as a part of continued attacks on BAPS temple in the United States within a year. The Consulate General in Chicago called the desecration "reprehensible".

In January 2026, a Sri Venkateswara temple in Cary, North Carolina was vandalized.

=== Past objections to Hindu prayers in legislatures ===
In 2000, the first Hindu opening prayer was offered in the U.S. Congress by Venkatachalapathi Samuldrala, a priest of Shiva Hindu Temple in Parma, Ohio. This prayer coincided with the visit of Prime Minister of India Atal Bihari Vajpayee to U.S. in 2000. Under the rules of the United States House of Representatives, Representative Sherrod Brown of Ohio invited a Hindu priest, Samuldrala. This prayer prompted criticism from some conservative Christian groups such as Family Research Council, who protested against it in conservative media, in turn generating responses from their opponents and leading to discussions over the role of legislative chaplains in a pluralist society.

On July 12, 2007, Rajan Zed, a Hindu priest, offered a prayer in the U.S. Senate as its guest priest. The proceedings were interrupted by three self-professed Christian protestors, who were arrested by Capitol Police and charged with a misdemeanor for disrupting Congress. The conservative Christian group American Family Association objected to the prayer, citing the loss of the "Judeo-Christian foundations" of the United States.

=== California textbook protest over Hindu history ===
In 2005, the Texas-based Vedic Foundation and the American Hindu Education Foundation filed a complaint to California's Curriculum Commission, arguing that the coverage of Indian history and Hinduism in 6th grade history textbooks was biased against Hinduism. Points of contention included a textbook's portrayal of the caste system, the Indo-Aryan migration theory, and the status of women in Indian society.

=== Caste discrimination allegations ===
Some aspects of caste discrimination that are found in South Asia have also been alleged in America, though the many U.S. based Hindu groups deny such claims. The historically underprivileged caste group, Dalits form a small 1.5% of all Indian immigrants to the United States, according to a University of Pennsylvania study carried out in 2003. While a controversial 2019 survey conducted by a Dalit rights group, Equality Labs claimed that the many Dalits living in the US reported facing caste-based harassment, the survey results were questioned by the Carnegie Endowment researchers, who pointed out that the study used a non-representative snowball sampling method to identify participants, which might have skewed the results.

Around 2023, several Hindu-American organizations successfully opposed the SB 403 bill, which aimed to introduce caste laws in California that could have unfairly targeted Hindu Americans. In 2023, California legislature proposed a bill to add "caste" under California laws, but the bill was vetoed by Governor Gavin Newsom noting that such measure was "unnecessary" because discrimination based on caste was already prohibited in the state, stating that "California already prohibits discrimination based on sex, race, color, religion, ancestry, national origin, disability, gender identity, sexual orientation, and other characteristics". Many Hindu American groups welcomed Governor's veto as they argued that the proposed bill attempted to unfairly malign their community.

=== 2026 Aurora Attempted Shooting ===
On October 11, 2026, according to prosecutors a 19-year old man allegedly attempted a mass shooting at the Sri Venkateswara Swami Temple in Aurora, Illinois during Navaratri celebrations. The planned attack failed after his rifle jammed. He told a co-worker afterwards that he planned to try again. The co-worker alerted law enforcement, which led to Paporakis's arrest. Police found a rifle and body armor at his home. Additionally, there was an eight-page manifesto in which he described himself as a white supremacist and referred to Indians and other minorities as 'subhumans'. US representative Raja Krishnamoorthi, who was in the temple with his family at the time, asked the FBI to investigate the case as a hate crime. Advocacy groups, Coalition of Hindus of North America and Stop AAPI Hate, linked the plot to the rise of anti-Hindu discourse online.

== Hindu organizations in America ==
Several organizations have been formed to raise issues impacting Hindu Americans and include a broad political range, from those aligned with Hindutva to progressive groups. Some of these organizations include:

- American Hindus for Engagement and Dialogue (AHEAD Forum): AHEAD forum is a U.S.based Hindu community organization that describes itself as promoting civic engagement, dialogue, interfaith understanding, and awareness of Hindu philosophy, culture, and contributions to American society.
- CoHNA: Coalition of Hindus of North America that promotes Hindutva goals.- Due to CoHNA's activism, Georgia passed a resolution condemning "Hinduphobia" in 2023, making it the first state in United States to pass such a resolution.
- Hindu American Foundation: HAF is an American Hindu advocacy group founded in 2003 with the broad aim of protecting the rights of Hindus in the United States and raising cultural appropriation issues. Around 2023, HAF was among several Hindu-American organizations that successfully opposed the SB 403 bill, which aimed to introduce caste laws in California.
- HinduPACT: The Hindu Policy Research and Advocacy Collective (HinduPACT) is an initiative of the Vishva Hindu Parishad America; the groups says it supports promotes Hindu values such as pluralism, while scholars say it promotes "Hindutva friendly candidates in U.S. election".
- Hindu Swayamsevak Sangh HSS USA was incorporated as a 501(c)(3) non-profit organization in 1989 to represent the interests of the Rashtriya Swayamsevak Sangh.
- Hindus for Human Rights: A pluralist advocacy organization founded in 2019 and known for civil rights work.
- Sadhana: A progressive group that aims to empower Hindu-Americans to live the values of their faith through service, community transformation, and advocacy work.

== See also ==
- Bhakti Fest
- Hinduism in Los Angeles
- Maharishi Vedic City, Iowa
- Vedanta Society of New York

== Sources ==
- Altman, Michael J. (2017). Heathen, Hindoo, Hindu: American Representations of India, 1721-1893. Oxford University Press. ISBN 978-0-19-065492-4.
- Baer, Hans A. (June 2003). "The work of Andrew Weil and Deepak Chopra—two holistic health/New Age gurus: a critique of the holistic health/New Age movements". Medical Anthropology Quarterly. 17 (2): 233–250. doi:10.1525/maq.2003.17.2.233. JSTOR 3655336. PMID 12846118. S2CID 28219719.
- Goldberg, Philip (2010). American Veda: from Emerson and the Beatles to yoga and meditation: how Indian spirituality changed the West. New York: Harmony Books. ISBN 978-0-385-52134-5. OCLC 503042149.
- Goldberg, Philip (2013). American Veda : from Emerson and the Beatles to yoga and meditation—how Indian spirituality changed the West. Three Rivers Press. ISBN 978-0-385-52135-2. OCLC 808413359.
- Hammond, Holly (2018). "The Timeline and History of Yoga in America". Yoga Journal.
- Larson, Gerald James (2009). Hinduism. In: "World Religions in America: An Introduction", pp. 179-198. Westminster John Knox Press. ISBN 978-1-61164-047-2. Archived from the original on December 23, 2023.
- Minor, Robert N. (1986). Modern Indian Interpreters of the Bhagavadgita. Albany, New York: State University of New York. ISBN 0-88706-297-0.
- Rajagopal, Arvind (2005). "Hindu Diaspora in the United States". In Ember, Melvin; Ember, Carol R.; Skoggard, Ian (eds.). Encyclopedia of Diasporas: Immigrant and Refugee Cultures Around the World. Boston, Ma: Springer US. pp. 445–454. doi:10.1007/978-0-387-29904-4_45. ISBN 978-0-387-29904-4.
- Robinson, Catherine A. (2014). Interpretations of the Bhagavad-Gita and Images of the Hindu Tradition: The Song of the Lord. Taylor & Francis. ISBN 978-1-134-27891-6.
- Singleton, Mark (2018). "The Ancient & Modern Roots of Yoga". Yoga Journal.
- Smith, Huston (2009). "Foreword". In Christopher Key Chapple (ed.). The Bhagavad Gītā: Twenty-fifth Anniversary Edition. State University of New York Press. ISBN 978-1-4384-2841-3.
- Stavig, Gopal (May 1976). "Pre-Transcendentalist American Interest in Indian Religion and Philosophy". Prabuddha Bharata: 229–233.
- Syman, Stefanie (2010). The Subtle Body : the Story of Yoga in America. Farrar, Straus and Giroux. ISBN 978-0-374-53284-0. OCLC 456171421.
