= Coalition of Hindus of North America =

Coalition of Hindus of North America (CoHNA) is a U.S.-based far-right advocacy organization, founded in 2020. The group has drawn attention for its promotion of Hindutva priorities.

== Hindu Nationalist Links ==
CoHNA's leadership overlaps heavily with numerous other Hindu nationalist groups, including the Vishva Hindu Parishad America (VHPA) (oldest Hindu nationalist group in the United States), Rashtriya Swayamsevak Sangh (RSS) (paramilitary group based in India), and Hindu Swayamsevak Sangh (HSS) (American branch of the RSS).

== American Partisanship ==
CoHNA has documented ties with numerous Republican politicians, especially in Georgia where the group is headquartered. They have attacked Democrats, most notably in 2022 when they ran an email campaign against a New Jersey-based Democratic Municipal Committee that had passed a resolution condemning Hindu nationalist organizations. CoHNA also used anti-Muslim language in the Teaneck incident.

CoHNA conducts an annual day of advocacy, reaching out directly to American politicians on Capitol Hill.

== Stances and Activities ==
=== Academic Freedom ===
CoHNA has criticized numerous scholars and academic events. Specific instances include a 2021 conference on Hindu nationalism hosted by 50+ universities and a 2025 Rutgers University report on Hindutva in America, through their youth wing CoHNA Youth Action Network (CYAN). In such cases, CoHNA generally claims to be protecting Hindu interests, and critics argue that they attack academic freedom and fuel violent threats against scholars.

=== BJP laws and activities ===
In 2020, CoHNA robustly defended the Citizenship Amendment Act and National Register of Citizens, signature BJP laws and BJP actions in Kashmir.

=== Caste ===
CoHNA has tried to block civil rights progress to address caste-based discrimination in the United States.

=== Indigeneity ===
CoHNA has drawn parallels between the treatment of Hindus during British colonialism and those of indigenous communities in North America. One scholars describes this as "false equivalency with Indigenous experiences of past and ongoing processes of colonialism".

== See also ==
- Vishva Hindu Parishad America
- Hindu American Foundation
- Hindu YUVA
- Hindu Students Council
