= Hindu American PAC =

The Hindu American PAC (HAPAC) is a political group that claims to advance Hindu American interests. It has been described as a "Hindu nationalist-aligned donor network" that is participating in an "emergent Multiracial Far Right" and has endorsed candidates such as Rich McCormick and David Brog. Hindu American PAC's leadership features many individuals with Hindu nationalist affiliations, including heavy overlap with the Hindu American Foundation.
