= Hindu University of America =

College in Florida, United States

Hindu University of America (HUA) is an unaccredited Hindu academic university based in Orlando, Florida. It was founded in 1989 by members of the Vishva Hindu Parishad America (VHPA) and promotes Hindutva ideology.

== History ==
The Hindu University of America was established in 1989. It was authorized by the State of Florida in 1993. Its founders were Hindu nationalist leaders, like Deendayal Khandelwal, affiliated with VHPA and other Sangh Parivar groups. Prema Kurien has called the establishment of HUA a "milestone" in the "institutionalization of Hinduism" in the United States and also notes the VHPA's involvement.

In 1993, the university required students to take several courses on the principles and practices of Hinduism and Sanskrit language to build a base upon which the student." In 2002, the university was described by India Abroad as teaching students in Hindu philosophy at a graduate level by correspondence," with their course work "reviewed and accepted by Florida's State Board of Independent Colleges." At that time, the university's operating costs hovered "just under $300,000 a year". In 2002, the Orlando Sentinel also profiled the emerging university, quoting one of the university's directors as attributing inspiration for the university to the late Hindu Swami Tilak, who "suggested an institution of higher learning".

The university held its first convocation in 2004, awarding two degrees.

In 2007, the Hindu University of America was reported as having "about 120 students across the world",. an "emphasis on distance education," and offering degrees that included yoga, meditation, ayurveda, vedic philosophy, and music.

As of 2020, the university was headed by Prof Kalyan Vishwanathan, a former global practice director of Tata Consultancy Services (TCS)

In 2023, the university received a 1 million dollar donation from Ramesh Bhutada, who has ties with numerous Hindutva groups.

== Academics ==
As of academic year 2019–2020, the university is not accredited.
