= Vishva Hindu Parishad America =

The Vishva Hindu Parishad America (VHPA, also known as VHP-A and VHP of America) is a US-based Hindu nationalist group founded in 1970. It was the first Sangh Parivar group founded in America and is the U.S. wing of the India-based Vishva Hindu Parishad (VHP).

== History ==
The VHPA was first founded in the United States in 1970 and formally incorporated in 1974. Its establishment in the United States was an explicit project of men affiliated with the paramilitary Rashtriya Swayamsevak Sangh, sent abroad for that purpose.

As of 2012, the VHPA was among the most active Hindu nationlist groups in the United States with more than 10,000 members.

The VHPA remains tightly linked to India's VHP. Exposes have outlined the how the VHPA has "offered significant material and political support to the VHP in India".

== Hindutva Views and Links ==
The VHPA is "aligned closely with Hindu nationalist politics in India" and often devotes resources to Indian political issues. While the VHPA's non-profit status in America forbids it from overtly pursuing political activities, "unofficially, VHP members and activists are networked with a range of Hindu organizations and groups around the country and in India, including those that are more overtly political." One example of its engagement in Indian politics is that, after its sister organization, the VHP, oversaw the destruction of the Babri Masjid in 1992 in India, the VHPA platformed VHP leaders in the United States who celebrated the violence. Past leaders of the VHPA have endorsed the BJP.

The VHPA has founded additional Hindu nationalist groups and organizations in the United States. This includes Hindu University of America an unaccredited higher education institution founded in 1989 that "continues to be very closely tied to the American Sangh." In 1990, the VHPA founded the Hindu Students Council (HSC) as a youth wing to spread Hindutva on American college campuses. In 2003, a mixture of VHPA and HSC leaders founded the Hindu American Foundation. In 2006, the VHPA founded the Hindu Mandir Executives' Conference (HMEC) "to spread Hindu nationalist propaganda under the guise of religious ideas more directly than any other group." In 2020, the VHPA founded HinduPACT to support Hindutva friendly candidates in American elections.

== See Also ==
- Vishva Hindu Parishad
- Hindu Swayamsevak Sangh
- Hindu American Foundation
- Hindu Students Council
