= Hindu American Foundation =

American Hindutva organization

- Abbreviation: HAF
- Formation: September 22, 2003; 23 years ago
- Founders: Sanjay Garg, Nikhil Joshi, Mihir Meghani, Nagendra Rao, Aseem Shukla
- Tax ID no.: 68-0551525
- Legal status: 501(c)(3) non-profit
- Purpose: Promotion of Hindutva
- Headquarters: 100 S Broad St, Philadelphia, Pennsylvania
- Region served: United States
- Executive Director: Suhag Shukla
- Affiliations: Sangh Parivar
- Website: www.hinduamerican.org

The Hindu American Foundation (abbr. HAF) is an American non-profit Hindutva organization founded in 2003. The organization has its roots in the Sangh Parivar, a collection of Hindutva organizations led by the paramilitary Rashtriya Swayamsevak Sangh, and more specifically in the Vishva Hindu Parishad America and its student wing Hindu Students Council.

The HAF's activism aligns with the Hindu nationalist ideology of Hindutva, alongside impinging on academic freedom. The organization argues that its advocacy focuses on protecting the rights of Hindus in the United States, drawing attention to Hindu persecution abroad, pushing back against the cultural appropriation of yoga, and opposing laws prohibiting caste-based discrimination. However, the HAF is thoroughly embedded in networks of Hindu nationalist politics and seeks to weaponize Hindu victimhood to bolster this agenda. Additionally, a Coalition Against Genocide report argues that one of its co-founders uses the organization to push Hindutva as an issue of "Hindu rights" to situate it in the mainstream politics of multiculturalism in the United States.

== Establishment ==
The Hindu American Foundation (HAF) was founded in September 2003 by Mihir Meghani, an emergency care physician; Aseem Shukla, an associate professor in urologic surgery; his wife, Suhag Shukla, an attorney; Nikhil Joshi, a labor law attorney; and his wife, Adeeti Joshi, a speech therapist. Describing itself as a human rights and advocacy group, it emphasized upon the "Hindu and American ideals of understanding, tolerance and pluralism". Vinay Lal, a professor of South Asian history at the University of California, Los Angeles noted that the organization appeared to have banked on the enormous goodwill created by Mahatma Gandhi in the West.

Previously, in 1991, Meghani had founded the University of Michigan's chapter of the Hindu Students Council (HSC), a nationwide network of student societies affiliated with the Vishwa Hindu Parishad America (VHPA). He went on to serve on the governing council of VHPA and authored an essay for the Bharatiya Janata Party (BJP) (Note: Meghani critiqued the "denigrations of Hindu traditions" and "pseudo-secularism" practiced by the Indian National Congress and went on to warn Muslims about the need of adjusting to a Hindutva-ized Bharat. Meghani claims to have changed his views on the subject in the years since publication; the essay was, apparently, a part of his academic coursework and he professes ignorance about how it came to the BJP.) comparing Hindus, a religious majority in India, with Jews, Black Americans, and colonized groups, whose bottled-up anger, for over a millennium, allegedly found a channel of outburst in the rise of the Bharatiya Janata Party and the demolition of the Babri Masjid.

Coalition Against Genocide (CAG), a platform established in the aftermath of the 2002 Gujarat riots against Hindu nationalist violence directed at Muslims, stated that the formation of the HAF has been the outcome of Meghani's parleys on the governing council of the VHPA and an effort to rebrand the Hindutva agenda (Note: Hindutva is the term used for the strand of Hindu nationalism in the present day context, which covers the present ruling party of India, the Bharatiya Janata Party, its parent organization Rashtriya Swayamsevak Sangh, and dozens of affiliated organizations that are collectively termed the Sangh Parivar.) as "Hindu rights" to suit mainstream American politics. They further note most of the HAF office bearers to have been drawn from HSC activists. The HAF rejected that their founders had any ties with Hindu Nationalist politics and accused CAG's "leaders and member organizations" of "espousing Marxist ideology or fringe Islamist positions, openly advocating anti-American, anti-Israel, and anti-India views".

== Activism ==
Hindu American Foundation doing outreach on Capitol Hill, meeting with Senator Stabenow, June 2016

The HAF was the first American Hindu advocacy organization to have a professional organizational structure as well as full-time staff and, in the 2010s, was widely considered to be the most prominent organization in the American Hindu advocacy field. The organization was aided by Jewish advocacy groups during its development; it continues to work with the Anti-Defamation League.

=== Highlighting Hindu persecution ===
During 2004–05, the organization held events to educate legislators about issues of concern to Hindu Americans. These included the abuse of Hindus in the Muslim-majority regions of South Asia, including Kashmir, Bangladesh and Pakistan, as well as in the Buddhist-majority regions of South Asia of Bhutan and Sri Lanka, and outside South Asia in Fiji, Malaysia, and Trinidad and Tobago; since then, they have continued to publish regular "Hindu Human Rights" reports. The HAF critiqued Pakistan's treatment of Hindus and advocated for better assimilation and integration of Pakistani Hindu migrants and refugees in India. Additionally, they have argued that in Pakistan and Bangladesh, Hindu women are "especially vulnerable" to kidnappings and forced conversions.

=== Advocacy for Hindu rights in the United States ===
In 2004, the HAF unsuccessfully challenged the public display of the Ten Commandments in Texas, appearing as amici curiae in Van Orden v. Perry in the United States Supreme Court; they argued that the display represented an "inherent government preference" for Judeo-Christian religions over others and hence, violated the state's obligation to maintain religious neutrality. In 2008, the HAF, along with Americans United for Separation of Church and State and congregational leaders of various religions, filed a lawsuit and blocked the issuance of Christian-themed license plates in South Carolina.

In 2015, as a part of the Hate Crimes Coalition, the HAF participated in the drafting and submission of edits to an FBI manual to track hate crimes against Hindus specifically. However, scholar Azad Essa has stated that the HAF has exaggerated the hate crimes faced by Hindus in America. Essa found the HAF's alarmist statements about a "rise" in Hinduphobic hate crimes in 2019 to not correspond with reality which was out of the 7,120 hate crimes which were reported to the FBI in 2018, only fourteen concerned Hindus; the years before, this count was stable at eleven and ten. Additionally, a review of HAF public communications by Jewish Currents found the organization had labelled more than 200 separate incidents as "Hinduphobic" or anti-Hindu between 2019 and 2024, regularly misclassifying anti-Asian racism, anti-Muslim violence, and criticism of Hindu nationalism as anti-Hindu hate.

In 2016, the HAF along with Indiaspora and other organizations convinced the United States Postal Service to issue a stamp commemorating the festival of Diwali.

=== Pro-India advocacy ===
In 2002, Gujarat witnessed widespread violence against Muslims under the Chief Ministership of Narendra Modi; the incumbent government has been widely blamed for active complicity. In 2005, when the Asian-American Hotel Owners Association invited Narendra Modi for an address, activists, including John Prabhudoss, lobbied the United States Congress to introduce a resolution criticizing him for his role in those riots. Joseph Pitts and John Conyers introduced House Resolution 160 to such effects. The HAF opposed this resolution, deeming it "Hinduphobic" and criticizing the Congressmen for making India the "focus of a resolution condemning religious persecution in South Asia" while ignoring Pakistan and Bangladesh. Nonetheless, the State Department denied Modi a visa two days after the bill was introduced. (Note: Modi would qualify for a visa and visit the United States only after becoming Prime Minister of India in 2014.)

In 2013, the HAF again opposed a fresh bill by Pitts that commended the 2005 visa denial, encouraged the federal government "to review the applications of any individuals implicated in religious freedom violations under the same standard", and urged for the repealing of anti-conversion laws in several Indian states. The HAF mounted fresh criticism, arguing that the bill ignored the impact of Islamist and Maoist terrorism in the country, and selectively targeted Hindus; a few Indian activist groups who supported the bill were denounced for supposedly being unpatriotic.

In 2016, the HAF hosted briefings for legislators about Pakistan’s support for terrorism in Kashmir and raised concern about how US aid might be diverted against India. In August 2019, after the revocation of the special status of Jammu and Kashmir, which took away the autonomy of the province and rendered it a union territory, the HAF published a "Reporter’s Guide" which emphasized about how the new regulations would ensure equal property rights for women, protections for the queer community, and better opportunities for Dalits in the region.

In 2022, the HAF co-sponsored a nationwide screening tour of the Hindi-language film The Kashmir Files, which scholars and critics characterised as anti-Muslim propaganda. HAF board member Rajiv Pandit hosted a screening in Dallas alongside the film's director, Vivek Agnihotri. That same year, HAF's year-end fundraiser, titled "Distortions of India and Hinduism", featured Abhijit Iyer-Mitra, a right-wing commentator with a documented history of anti-Muslim speech.

In 2024, the Congressional Research Service listed the HAF among Hindu nationalist groups operating in the United States, noting that the organization had for two decades sought to influence the presidency, Congress, and state governments, "by some accounts directly on behalf of the New Delhi government". Journalist Zahir Janmohamed recounted a congressional staffer telling him the "HAF is not promoting Modi but they are definitely trying to undermine anyone in Washington who is critical of Modi".

In 2025, the HAF was named in a complaint to the United States Department of Justice, alleging that under the Foreign Agents Registration Act the HAF operates as an unregistered foreign agent of India's BJP and is in a "fiduciary" relationship with the Indian Embassy in D.C., as per embassy-provided documents. The HAF dismissed the charges as false; they argued the complaint was filed by Lex Politica, a right-wing law firm, at the behest of groups supportive of the Khalistan movement.

The HAF supports strong ties between India, Israel, and the US to create an axis of countries against Islamic terrorism.

=== Anti-conversion laws and Hinduization ===
The HAF has been a vocal defender of anti-conversion laws enacted by several Indian states, contending that such statutes shield socioeconomically vulnerable populations which includes children, the poor, and the illiterate from being induced into changing religion in exchange for medical aid, education, or employment.

Writing in Byline Times, columnist CJ Werleman stated that while the HAF actively promotes anti-conversion legislation in India, it has remained silent on forced conversions to Hinduism and on the "Hinduization" or ghar wapsi (homecoming) campaigns conducted by affiliates of the Sangh Parivar, in which Christians and Muslims are pressured or coerced into adopting Hinduism.

Varghese K. George, resident editor at The Hindu, states the HAF opposes conversions, except to Hinduism, and that it opposes missionary efforts, except by Hindus, and opines that it makes "the argument that poor, uneducated people in India are gullible to the machinations of evangelists".

In November 2013, a bipartisan group of fourteen U.S. Representatives introduced House Resolution 417, which praised India's religious diversity but urged the Indian government to act against violence directed at religious minorities, criticized Narendra Modi's role in the 2002 Gujarat violence, and called for the repealing of state anti-conversion laws. The HAF mobilized against the resolution, lobbying every co-sponsoring office and pressuring several lawmakers to withdraw their support; a Congressional staffer told a journalist that the HAF was working to undermine the bill, and the resolution ultimately stalled.

Investigations into the HAF's role within the broader U.S.-based Hindutva network have characterized the organization as part of a movement that seeks to relegate Christians, Muslims, Sikhs, Dalits, and Adivasis to a subordinate status in India. In its 2013 report, the Coalition Against Genocide described the HAF as part of a constellation of U.S. front organizations for the ideology behind the persecution of Christians, Muslims, Dalits, and other minorities in India, language that the HAF later sued to retract. Adjudicating that suit, U.S. District Judge Amit Mehta ruled that statements characterizing the HAF as supportive of Hindutva were matters of opinion and even the most extreme statements were "rhetorical hyperbole" expressing strong disagreement; therefore, he ruled, such statements could not plausibly be called "verifiably false", a necessary condition in defamation. On this basis, he dismissed the action.

The HAF has additionally been criticized for defending actors associated with anti-Christian and anti-Muslim mobilization in India. A report issued by Savera, summarized in Harper's Magazine by Andrew Cockburn, documents that HAF leaders have defended Hindu nationalist figures implicated in communal violence and have publicly attacked human rights documentation by Amnesty International and Human Rights Watch of abuses against Indian minorities. Reporting by The Intercept similarly described the HAF as deterring members of Congress from taking critical positions on India's treatment of religious minorities. Audrey Truschke, a historian at Rutgers University, has argued that this pattern reflects the HAF's broader function as an apologist for Hindu majoritarianism rather than a defender of pluralism.

=== Take Back Yoga campaign ===
In 2010, the HAF launched the "Take Back Yoga" campaign as a reaction to alleged cultural appropriation and secularization of yoga by popular press and neo-gurus who according to the HAF "abstained from discussing the origins of yoga in Hinduism and corrupted a Hindu philosophical practice to a mere collection of physical postures", with its cofounder Aseem Shukla writing an opinion piece on the subject to the Washington Post. Particular emphasis was laid on the Hindu nature of yoga manuals across centuries to corroborate claims of yoga being a Hindu form of spiritual quest. Deepak Chopra, a pseudoscientific New Age guru, responded to Shukla's post, and the two had a lengthy exchange on the subject; Chopra argued that calling Yoga a Hindu concept had "tribal" implications.

Andrea Jain, a professor of Religious Studies at Indiana University, located the HAF's claims within a polemical discourse of religious fundamentalism that unwittingly borrowed from and mirrored the West; while the HAF spoke about the inevitable Hinduization of anybody who chooses to practice Yoga in its "true essence", the Christian far-right had denounced Yoga as a satanic act which in their view took practitioners away from Jesus of Nazareth into the fold of Brahmins. Furthermore, Jain found the HAF's essentialist discourse on Yoga to be ahistorical; according to her, Yoga was a fluid tradition made and remade by different socio-religious cultures across different times with different connotations. Other scholars reiterate Jain's observations; Christopher Patrick Miller, a professor of Yoga Studies at Loyola Marymount University, found it ironic that to defend against perceived Christian ingressions, the HAF had to borrow from Christian (and colonial) notions of what constituted a Yogic canon.

Anya Foxen and Christa Kuberry, the former a professor of religion at the California Polytechnic State University and the latter a senior yoga educator, argue that the HAF's views on yoga are colored by its leadership being predominately born and raised in the United States, and having experienced "gross misconceptions and outright attacks" against Hindu Americans, leading to an intense defensiveness. They cite a professor of religious studies at the University of Indiana, Candy Gunther Brown, who argued that every yoga practice was "indelibly infused with the essence of Hindu religiosity", thus supporting their view. However, they ultimately conclude that the HAF is motivated by a sense of branding.

=== Caste ===
In 2010, the HAF issued a report titled "Hinduism: Not Cast in Caste" alleging that Christian missionaries were able to push their proselytizing agenda only because of the prevalence of caste discrimination in India; it went on to argue that caste cannot be considered to be an intrinsic definitional aspect of Hinduism due to a lack of theological sanction in its most sacred texts and urged for reforms led by Hindus themselves. This led to a flutter in conservative Hindu circles in India; in particular, the Hindu nationalist polemicist Rajiv Malhotra alleged this report, by declaring the South Asian caste system a human rights issue, created "a serious vulnerability for the Hindu cause" which would inspire "Christian and leftist groups" to intervene in India and consolidate their interests.

The following year, the HAF toned down their report; they even cautioned against the trend of passing resolutions against caste discrimination adopted by various global organizations and held caste to be an internal affair of a sovereign India. The HAF has since portrayed castes as occupational guilds which had brought stability to premodern India before being reified under British colonial rule; it has vehemently opposed drawing parallels between caste-discrimination and racism — arguing that it belittles the brutality faced by African Americans — or even any depiction of the caste-system as a rigid birth-determined pyramid of hierarchy.

In 2021, on the heels of prolonged transnational activism by Dalits, "caste" was added as a protected category to California State University's anti-discrimination policy. The HAF perceived such policies to have the potential to enable the malicious targeting of Indian Hindu academics and lodged stiff opposition; their office-bearers argued caste to be a "stereotype" that was imposed upon South Asians under British rule. In October 2022, the HAF provided legal representation to two University of California professors who sued their employer to prevent the implementation of caste-based protections. The month before, they sued the California Civil Rights Department for allegedly misrepresenting caste as intrinsic to Hinduism in its submission to the Cisco caste discrimination lawsuit.

Ajantha Subramaniam, a professor of South Asian Studies at Harvard University, disagreed with HAF's claims that caste was a mere "stereotype" and questioned their accusations of being discriminated based on religion since caste cuts across all religions and nationalities in South Asia. She and other scholars emphasized the depth of scholarship that has held caste to be a lived reality from premodern South Asia to present-day India including in the diaspora.

==== SB403 ====
In early 2023, the HAF was among several Hindu-American organizations that opposed the SB 403 bill, which aimed to explicitly add caste into the definition of ancestry under anti-discrimination laws in California. The proponents of the bill insisted that an explicit ban on caste discrimination was needed to raise awareness of this bias, but the HAF contended that this proposal unfairly targeted Hindus; and may result in racial profiling against Hindu Americans.

In May, the California State Senate passed the bill after a divisive debate. However, in October 2023, after sustained lobbying by the HAF, California Governor Gavin Newsom vetoed the bill, agreeing that "caste discrimination [was] already prohibited under existing civil rights protections".

=== Alliances with Christian nationalists ===
Investigations into the HAF have revealed alliance-building with Christian nationalists, despite Hindu Americans being "significantly affected" by such elements. The HAF's Senior Director of Communications has argued that religious bigotry from Christian nationalists is ancillary to the threat of American progressivism, in comments endorsed by its managing director and CFO. The Hindu American PAC, an organization chaired by an HAF co-founder along with other members of its senior leadership, (Note: Hindu American PAC's board of directors includes Sheetal Shah (HAF Managing Director & CFO), Rajiv Pandit (HAF Board of Directors member), and Aseem Shukla (HAF co-founder and National Leadership Council member), https://www.hinduamericanpac.com/about) donated $5000 to the 2022 congressional run of David Brog, an associate of the Christian fundamentalist preacher John Hagee. Brog subsequently wrote an essay for Jews and Hindus to be the leaders of an "anti-woke" alliance; according to a report from Political Research Associates, this served as reciprocation for this support. Experts have argued that such an alliance means alignment with figures who regard Hindus as "pagan, heathen, or satanic"; a Jewish Currents report argues that at least 47% of hate crimes against Hindus called out by the HAF derive from Christian extremists or other associated elements, including accusations of devil worship.

== Attacks on academic freedom ==
Audrey Truschke, a historian of South Asia at Rutgers University, notes the HAF to have "prioritized attacks on higher education". Additionally, 2025 report by the Rutgers Center for Security, Race and Rights found that U.S.-based Hindu nationalist organizations, including the HAF, push politicised classroom materials into K-12 settings, exploiting educators' unfamiliarity with South Asian religions and politics to advance Hindutva ideology. The report further documented that such organizations target scholars critical of Hindutva with harassment tactics including doxxing, lawsuits, and threats, seeking to intimidate and silence academic voices.

Writing in Harper's Magazine, Andrew Cockburn reported that Truschke has required armed police protection during lectures and public appearances owing to threats connected to her critiques of Hindu nationalism. Truschke told Cockburn that she receives death threats, misogynist attacks, and threats against her children, and that it would "probably be unsafe" for her ever to return to India. She argues that the HAF is part of the Hindutva ecosystem which fosters such threats, including through the use of a lawsuit. Pratik Sinha, co-founder of the Indian fact-checking platform Alt News, told Jewish Currents that groups like the HAF manufacture a narrative of Hindu victimhood in order to advance a political agenda rooted in Hindu nationalism.

=== Textbook revisionism in California ===
In March 2006, the HAF filed a lawsuit against California's Curriculum Commission's decision to reject most of the edits proposed by the Vedic Foundation and Hindu Education Foundation, two groups linked to the RSS, a Hindutva paramilitary organization, to the textbooks taught in the state. The suggested changes had sought to downplay the salience of caste in Indian history, reject Indo-Aryan migrations in favor of Indigenous Aryanism, (Note: The HAF has also critiqued The Story of India for showcasing the theory of Indo-Aryan migrations.) and not describe the declining status of women in ancient India, arguing that such portrayals would humiliate Hindu children in classrooms. Multiple Indologists, including Romila Thapar, Michael Witzel, Harry Falk, Robert P. Goldman, Jonathan Mark Kenoyer, Sheldon Pollock, Patrick Olivelle and Madhav Deshpande, and other South Asian activist groups opposed the changes. The court ruled against the HAF and chose to retain the textbooks; it found the HAF's accusations of a biased and negative portrayal of Hinduism unpersuasive.

In 2016, the HAF lobbied against the replacement of the word "Indian" with "South Asian" in middle school history textbooks in California, arguing that the change was essentially an erasure of India itself. These efforts were protested by South Asian academics and activists belonging to India's minority groups, who said that those on the side of the HAF sought to whitewash California's history textbooks to present a nativist, blemish-free view of how the Hindu caste system was enforced in India. They also argued that the term "South Asia" correctly represents India's collective history with countries like Pakistan and Bangladesh. A letter to the California State Board of Education about this issue, which garnered thousands of signatures, was headed by the HAF.

=== Criticism of Wendy Doniger ===
In 2009, Wendy Doniger, a professor of religion at the University of Chicago, published The Hindus: An Alternative History, to positive reviews in mainstream media. However, soon it drew ire from the Hindu right-wing who alleged Doniger's work to be stigmatizing of Hinduism.

The following year, as the National Book Critics Circle shortlisted her work for its 2010 annual awards, the HAF protested the choice. They alleged Doniger's scholarship to be laden with numerous inaccuracies and an anti-Hindu bias. The HAF also accused her of offering "offensive, shocking, and gratuitous deconstruction of some of the most important [Hindu] epics" and providing "pornographic depictions" of Hindu deities. Suhag Shukla, director of the HAF and also a former student of Doniger, went on to criticize the American Academy of Religion for coming out in support of Doniger and supporting the academic freedom of scholars "to offer any interpretation" of any religion. Michael Jerryson, a professor of religious studies, argues that this advocates for religious organizations to control and mute academic discussion; he points to Shukla banning positive comments from her column as a direct, concrete, application of this.

=== Defamation suit against academics and activists ===
In May 2021, the HAF filed a defamation lawsuit against Sunita Viswanath and Raju Rajagopal of Hindus for Human Rights, Rasheed Ahmed from the Indian American Muslim Council, Prabhudoss, and Truschke. It alleged statements in two Al Jazeera articles that characterized the HAF as having "ties to Hindu supremacist and religious groups" and with the RSS as defamatory. A diverse group of intellectuals and academics, Akeel Bilgrami, Amitav Ghosh, Anita Desai, Cornel West, Martha Nussbaum, Nandini Sundar, Noam Chomsky, Romila Thapar, Sudipta Kaviraj, Sheldon Pollock, and Wendy Doniger among others, condemned the HAF's tactics as a SLAPP, designed to silence critics and push forward Hindutva.

On 15 March 2022, Judge Amit Mehta stayed the defendants' motions to dismiss the suit since he deemed one of their arguments about whether the HAF had satisfied the second requirement of invoking diversity jurisdiction, by proving the amount of monetary loss to have exceeded 75,000 USD, as a "substantial question" of procedure, that needed to be settled before adjudication on merits. Mehta accepted the HAF's new evidence to pass muster and ordered discovery. On 20 December 2022, he dismissed the suit since the HAF had failed not only to establish any cause of action, even assuming that their allegations were factually accurate, (Note: Judge Mehta rejected that the HAF had provided any evidence to support that the defenders were acting with malice, which is integral to maintainability of a defamation suit.) but also to provide any evidence that the court had personal jurisdiction over the defendants except one. (Note: HAF requested discovery to bolster its jurisdictional claims; Mehta denied the request for being a "fishing expedition, [..] not made in good faith." As to the lone defendant - Prabhudoss - over whom the Court had jurisdiction, Mehta ruled that his statements were opinions that could not be plausibly alleged to be "verifiably false" and hence not litigable.)

In 2024, Mehta unsealed court documents obtain in discovery on the HAF, including donor records, emails, and part of Suhag Shukla's deposition. Defendants in the lawsuit argued that these documents showed that the HAF's executive director was "unable to back up any of HAF's allegations [in the lawsuit] in its complaint with evidence".

=== Opposing Dismantling Global Hindutva conference ===
During August–September 2021, the HAF launched a protest campaign against a virtual conference, Dismantling Global Hindutva: Multidisciplinary Perspectives, organized by a conglomeration of American universities. It accused the conference of platforming activists with "extensive histories of amplifying Hinduphobic discourse ... [who] equate the whole of Hinduism with caste bigotry, deny the subcontinental indigeneity of Hindus ... and deny the resulting genocides and ethnic cleansings of Hindus". (Note: On the politics of the deployment of the term "Hindu genocide" and its (lack of) historical accuracy, see Subrahmanyam, Sanjay (2 January 2023). "Inventing a 'Genocide': The Political Abuses of a Powerful Concept in Contemporary India". The Journal of Holocaust Research. 37 (1): 102–107. doi:10.1080/25785648.2022.2153974. ISSN 2578-5648.)

The HAF subsequently complained to the Department of Education's Office of Civil Rights against the University of Pennsylvania for violating Title VI requirements — they alleged that the University co-sponsored a "one-sided" conference that promoted negative "negative stereotypes, slurs, and distorted facts" about "India and Hindus". However, multiple professors at the University who identify as Hindus rejected the accusations and highlighted how the HAF had weaponized Hindutva to stifle free speech. Dheepa Sundaram, a religion and digital culture scholar at University of Denver, found the lawsuit to leverage "the rhetoric and tactics of social justice activists" in "pursuit of an oppressive ideology".

== Funding controversies ==
The HAF's funding sources have drawn scrutiny in this context. In April 2021, Al Jazeera reported that the HAF was one of five U.S.-based organizations linked to Sangh Parivar networks that had together received approximately $833,000 in federal Paycheck Protection Program (PPP) loans and Economic Injury Disaster Loan Advances during the COVID-19 pandemic; the HAF received the largest individual share, around $378,064 in PPP funds and an additional $10,000 in EIDL Advance. The reporting placed the HAF alongside Sewa International, the Vishwa Hindu Parishad of America, the Ekal Vidyalaya Foundation, and Rajiv Malhotra's Infinity Foundation, entities described in the article as having documented links to organizations that have been associated in India with violence against Christian, Muslim and Dalit communities. The HAF rejected this characterization and subsequently filed the defamation action.

Tax filings reviewed by Frontline and other outlets indicate substantial donor overlap between the HAF and U.S. foundations that fund Sangh-affiliated groups in India. The Bhutada Family Foundation, whose principal Ramesh Bhutada has served as a national vice-president of the Hindu Swayamsevak Sangh (the U.S. arm of the RSS), donated $362,242 to the HAF between 2005 and 2018 while contributing more than $1 million during the same period to Sangh-affiliated organizations including Sewa International, Ekal Vidyalaya, the HSS and the VHPA, according to publicly filed IRS Form 990 records. Several of these recipient organizations, particularly Ekal Vidyalaya, which operates schools in Indian tribal areas, have been documented by scholars and journalists as participating in ghar wapasi and "Hinduization" programs among Adivasi and tribal communities, including in regions where Christian populations have subsequently come under attack.

The HAF has also lobbied against United States legislative measures that drew attention to anti-Christian violence in India. In addition to its 2013 campaign against H.Res. 417, the HAF opposed the 2019 resolution introduced by Representative Pramila Jayapal urging India to lift its Kashmir communications blackout and end mass detentions, and has issued statements criticising the U.S. Commission on International Religious Freedom for placing India on its Country of Particular Concern recommendation list which was a designation USCIRF has based in part on documented violence against Christians, including the destruction of churches during the 2023 Manipur violence. Writing in Harper's Magazine, Andrew Cockburn observed that the HAF's pattern of advocacy has functioned to insulate the Indian government from sustained Congressional engagement on its religious-freedom record, even as the conflict in Manipur produced documented attacks on Kuki-Zo Christians and the destruction of more than three hundred churches.

The Hindu American Political Action Committee (HAPAC), whose board overlaps substantially with HAF leadership, donated nearly $183,000 to 27 Democratic candidates and approximately $52,000 to 11 Republican candidates between 2012 and 2024, according to Federal Election Commission data analysed by Al Jazeera. Recipients have included Representative Brad Sherman, HAPAC's third-largest recipient at $20,600, who urged colleagues to attend the "Howdy Modi" rally despite Congressional alarm over Indian government actions in Kashmir, and Tulsi Gabbard, who received $8,500 prior to her appointment as Director of National Intelligence.

== Reception ==
Many scholars argue that the HAF purveys a politics embedded in Hindutva. Sailaja Krishnamurti, a professor at Saint Mary's University (Halifax) who specializes in religious traditions of the South Asian diaspora, summarized that the HAF has "earned a reputation" of being a conservative group purveying Hindu nationalist politics. Ilyse Morgenstein Fuerst, a historian specializing in South Asian religions at the University of Vermont, qualified the HAF as a "deeply conservative" outfit. Sangay K. Mishra, an assistant professor of political science at Drew University, argues that the HAF numbers among "the second wave of Hindutva organizations in the United States that tend to focus on second-generation Hindu Indian Americans". Truschke notes that "HAF's founders in the early 2000s had well-documented ties to the VHPA, HSS, HSC, BJP, and even the RSS" and says "The Hindu American Foundation is unthinkable, even in name, without the wider Sangh Parivar context."

Walter Andersen and Shridhar Damle, scholars on the Rashtriya Swayamsevak Sangh, argue that the HAF is not "formally linked" to the Sangh Parivar; however, they note that it previously worked with the Hindu Swayamsevak Sangh, an overseas RSS affiliate, and that the two cooperate in holding seminars and providing multimedia resources for teachers, as well as classroom presentations on Hindu customs.

Sundaram found among the group's aims to sanitize the exclusionary nature of Hindutva, in part by borrowing from decolonial vocabulary, misleadingly portraying terms like "Hindutva", "Brahminism", etc. as oriental pejoratives. Chad Bauman, a professor of religion at Butler University, contended the HAF's portrayal of Hinduism to be misleadingly monolithic and in service of a political agenda. Nishant Upadhyay, a professor at the University of Colorado, Boulder, specializing in gender and sexuality studies found the group's queer-friendly portrayal of Hinduism to be embedded within a discourse of Hindutva homonationalism.

S. N. Balagangadhara, a professor of religious studies at the University of Ghent, endorsed the principle of an organization seeking to correct the manner in which Hinduism is regarded in the West, which he described as the inheritance of Orientalism. However, he argued that the HAF does so by presenting Hinduism as a "pale variant" of the Abrahamic religions out of a spirit of respectability politics, which serves to make the Hindu American unaware of their own beliefs as anything other than cognate to ideas in Abrahamic religions. He argued that the "sense of complacency" must be shaken off and "hard intellectual labour" done to translate Hindu philosophy into modern language, without resorting to false parallels.

The BBC has noted that the HAF has lobbied support in favor of Narendra Modi, the incumbent Prime Minister of India, amongst the diaspora. Georgetown University's Bridge Initiative found the HAF board member Rishi Bhutada to have also served as the official spokesperson of "Howdy Modi", a Rashtriya Swayamsevak Sangh (RSS)-backed rally in support of India's incumbent prime minister Narendra Modi held in Houston, Texas in 2019. They — as well as several journalists — documented numerous anti-Muslim statements made by the HAF board members, past and present. Academics and journalists have also investigated money trails linking the HAF to other Sangh Parivar groups via their donors.

Varghese K. George, resident editor of The Hindu, notes that the HAF "is not allied to Hindutva nationalistic groups or organizations in India in any formal or technical way", although he argues that it "contextualiz[es]" Hindu nationalist attacks in manners "overlooking or even promoting" Hindutva. Though noting the HAF views itself as a broad-based civil rights organization, and that it has defended the civil rights of other American religious minorities, including Muslims, he also notes it "affirms the Hindutva Strategic Doctrine" through wrapping Hinduism with "statecraft".

Activist Prachi Patankar argues the HAF generates a sense of Hindu victimhood which, though based on religious bigotry in the United States and persecution of Hindus in Pakistan and Bangladesh, they use against Muslims and Dalits.

=== Response ===
The HAF denies these charges, claims to be non-partisan, and has unsuccessfully filed defamation suits against organizations and individuals that have alleged its links to Hindutva. However, Arun Chaudhuri, an anthropologist of religion and politics at York University, cautions that such disavowals should not be taken at face value but rather as efforts at distancing the HAF from the overtly negative connotations of Hindu nationalism. Sonia Sikka, an academic specializing in the intersection of religion and politics, also rejects the HAF's claims of non-partisanship.

== See also ==
- Vishva Hindu Parishad America
- Hindu American PAC
- Coalition of Hindus of North America
- Hindu Students Council
