= Sri Ganesha Temple of Alaska =

Hindu temple in Alaska

- Location in Alaska

Religion
- Affiliation: Hinduism
- Deity: Ganesha

Location
- Location: Anchorage, Alaska
- State: Alaska
- Country: United States
- Coordinates: 61.159402°N 149.954632°W

Architecture
- Completed: 2011

Website
- www.sriganeshatemple.com

The Sri Ganesha Temple of Alaska is a Hindu temple in Anchorage, Alaska. Inaugurated in 1999, it is the first Hindu temple in Alaska. Its main deity is Ganesha.

== History ==
In 1995, a group of local Hindus started worshipping together informally in Downtown Anchorage. American Hindu leader Sivaya Subramuniyaswami donated a Ganesha murti to the group, and on June 25, 1999, formally established the Sri Ganesha Mandir in rented space in the Anchorage Church Of Religious Science. During the inauguration, local Inuit spiritual leaders and elders blessed the congregation with songs, chants, and drumming. Approximately forty visiting Hindu pilgrims also attended the event.

In 2003. it purchased a property on Raspberry Road to become the temple's permanent home. The property was renovated, and several murtis were installed. The temple moved to and opened at its new location in 2011.
