= Hindu Students Council =

North American student organization

Logo

The Hindu Students Council (HSC) is an organisation with college branches in the United States and Canada. The HCS began as a Hindu right-wing group in 1990 that promotes Hindutva or Hindu nationalism. Scholars consider the HSC an ongoing part of the Sangh Parivar.

== History ==
The HSC was set up in 1990 with support from the Vishwa Hindu Parishad of America (VHPA), a Hindu nationalist organization. Explaining the relationship, Vijay Prashad wrote, "The VHPA acts multiculturally through its student wing, the Hindu Students Council (HSC), which champions a syndicated Brahmanical Hinduism (or Hindutva) as the neglected culture of the Hindu Americans". The HSC also had ties with India's Rashtriya Swayamsevak Sangh (RSS), which launched the Global Hindu Electronic Network through the HSC in 1996.

The HSC became formally independent in 2003, although the group continued to espouse Hindu nationalist views and continued its links with other Hindu nationalist groups. This includes hosting RSS leaders.

HCS leaders have gone on to become leaders in national Hindutva groups, including the VHPA and the Hindu American Foundation.

== Hindutva Views ==
Scholars view the HSC as promoting standard Hindutva views regarding religious minorities, women, and academic censorship.

HSC events have recurrently featured anti-Muslim sentiments, including platforming Vivek Agnihotri in 2019 and airing "a familiar Hindutva litany of global terrorism perpetrated by Islamists, anticonversion policies targeting Muslims and Christians in India (a key priority for the Sangh Parivar), and “scholarly misrepresentation” of Indian traditions" at a post-9/11 conference.

HSC chapters and events have often been male-dominated and endorse traditional gender role for women.

HSC chapters often protest against academic discussions of caste discrimination, Hindutva, and HSC's own role in the Sangh Parivar, labeling such subjects as "hinduphobic" speech. This has led to scholarly criticism of the HSC and other Hindu nationalist student groups as infringing on academic freedom.

Numerous scholars have done fieldwork and interviews with HSC students. Prema Kurien, who conducted ethnographic research at an HSC chapter in southern California in the early 2000s, noted variety between the political engagement of different HSC chapters, describing one chapter as "strongly against involvement in politics" while another was "conflict ridden" and expressed Hindu nationalist ideas. Biju Mathew and Vijay Prashad conducted extensive interviews in the 1990s and viewed the HSC as an attempt for the VHPA to exert control over Hindu college students.

== See Also ==
- Akhil Bharatiya Vidyarthi Parishad
- Hindu YUVA
- National Hindu Students' Forum
