= Pratap Bhanu Mehta =

Indian academic (born 1967)

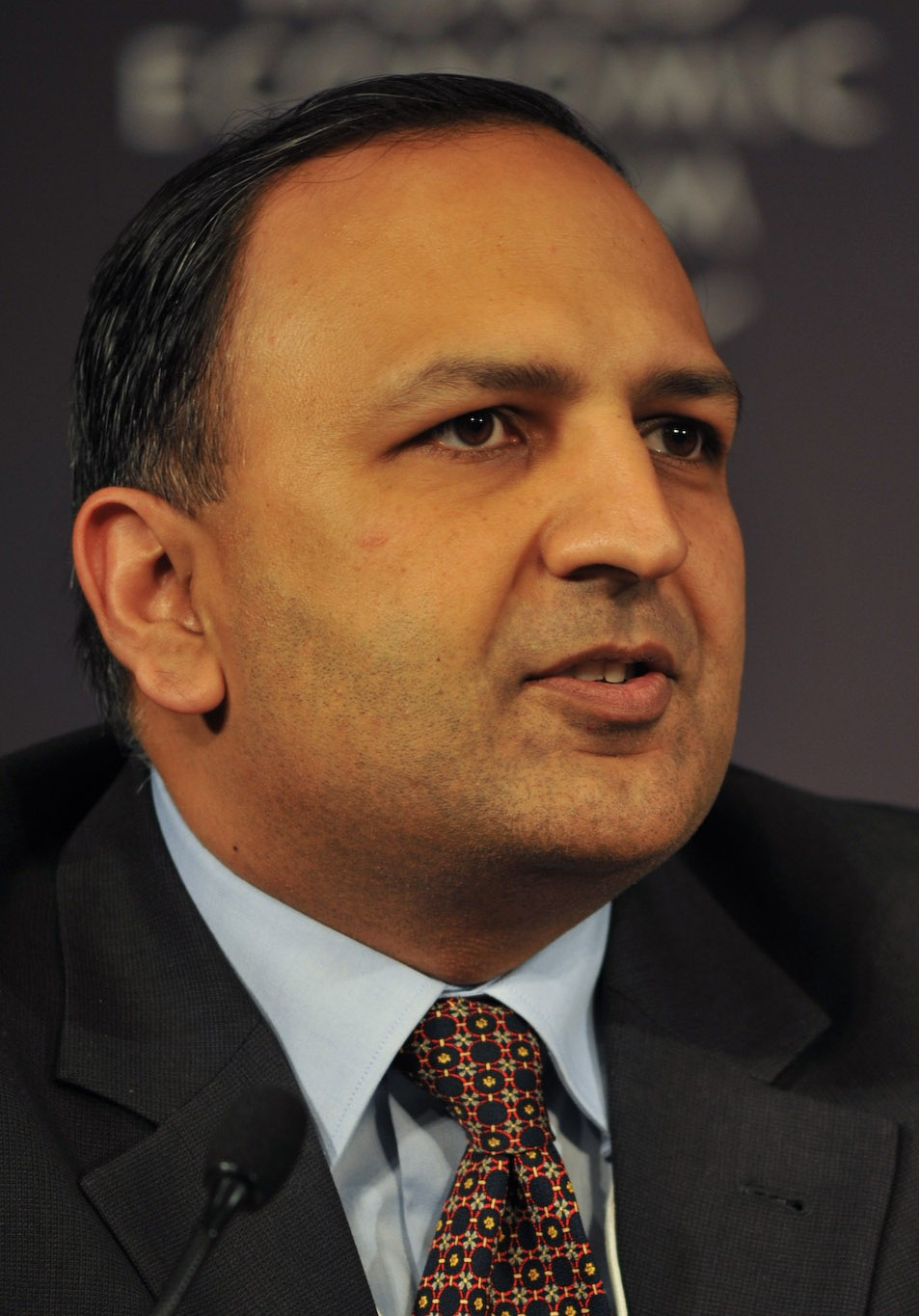
- Mehta speaking at the World Economic Forum's India Economic Summit 2009
- Born: 1967 (age 58–59); Jodhpur, Rajasthan, India
- Education: St. Edward's School, Shimla: St John's College, Oxford; Princeton University
- Scientific career
- Fields: Political Science
- Workplaces: Centre for Policy Research

2nd Vice Chancellor of Ashoka University
- In office 2017–2019
- Preceded by: Prof. Rudrangshu Mukherjee
- Succeeded by: Prof. Malabika Sarkar

Pratap Bhanu Mehta (born 1967) is an Indian academic. He is a former president of the Centre for Policy Research, a New Delhi-based think tank and was the Vice-Chancellor of Ashoka University from July 2017 to July 2019.

== Early life ==
Pratap was born in a Rajasthani Jain family in Jodhpur. His father VR Mehta was the Vice-chancellor of University of Delhi. His initial schooling was at the St. Edwards School in Shimla and St. Xaviers, Jaipur. Mehta obtained a B.A. from St John's College, Oxford in Philosophy, Politics and Economics (PPE) and a Ph.D. in Politics from Princeton University.

== Career ==
Mehta has held several teaching positions. He was a professor at NYU School of Law, a visiting professor of government at Harvard University, Associate Professor of Government and of Social Studies at Harvard, and for a brief period, Professor of Philosophy and of Law and Governance at Jawaharlal Nehru University. He was Member-Convenor of the Prime Minister of India's National Knowledge Commission, Member of the Supreme Court-appointed Lyngdoh Committee on elections in Indian Universities, and has contributed to a number of reports for leading Government of India and International Agencies. He was on the Board of Governors of International Development Research Centre. He was vice-chair of the World Economic Forum's Council on Global Governance. He has also served on the Board of NIPFP, NCAER and NIID. He is on the editorial board of journals such as the American Political Science Review and Journal of Democracy. He received the 2010 Malcolm Adiseshiah Award and the 2011 Infosys Prize for Social Sciences (Political Science and International Relations). He also served on the Social Sciences jury for the Infosys Prize in 2017.

Mehta has published widely in the fields of political theory, intellectual history, constitutional law, politics and society in India and international politics. His scholarly articles have appeared in leading international referred journals in the field, as well as numerous edited volumes. His early work was on eighteenth century thought, particularly on Adam Smith and the Making of the Enlightenment. Mehta is an editorial consultant to leading national daily The Indian Express, and his columns have appeared in dailies including the Financial Times, the Telegraph, the International Herald Tribune, and the Hindu. He is also on the editorial boards of many academic journals, including the American Political Science Review, the Journal of Democracy, and India and Global Affairs.

== Political stances ==
Mehta resigned from the National Knowledge Commission in 2006 in protest against the UPA government's Higher Education Policies.

Mehta also resigned from the executive committee of the prestigious Nehru Memorial Museum & Library in 2016 to protest the appointment of a politically connected bureaucrat as director. He cited discomfort at being complicit in what he considered was the marginalisation of academic considerations by the government in making the appointment. Mehta also believes that reading news from authentic sources is the need of the hour especially when the youth of the nation is using websites such as Wikipedia to gain information and form an opinion, especially when misinformation and disinformation is on the rise.

From 2017 to 2019, he was the Vice-Chancellor of Ashoka University, a position from where he resigned citing academic reasons. He resigned from Ashoka University as a professor in March 2021, when trustees Pramath Raj Sinha and Ashish Dhawan are said to have told Mehta that "his intellectual interventions were something they could no longer protect.". The circumstances of Mehta's resignation also led to protests across Ashoka University, which involved student-led class boycotts. The students also demanded the resignation of Vice-Chancellor Malabika Sarkar unless the administration offered Mehta his job back.

== Selected works ==
- Navigating the Labyrinth: Perspectives on India’s Higher Education (ed. with Devesh Kapur), Orient BlackSwan, 2017
- Rethinking Public Institutions in India (ed. with Devesh Kapur and Milan Vaishnav), Oxford University Press, 2017
- The Oxford Companion to Indian Constitution (ed. with Madhav Khosla and Sujit Choudhary), Oxford University Press, 2016
- Shaping the Emerging World: India and the Multilateral Order (ed. with W. P. Sidhu and Bruce Jones) Brookings, 2013
- Non Alignment 2.0: A Foreign and Strategic Policy for India in the 21st Century (with Sunil Khilnani et al.) Penguin, 2013
- The Oxford Companion to Politics in India (ed. with Niraja Jayal), Oxford University Press, 2010
- Public Institutions in India: Performance and Design (ed. with Devesh Kapur), Oxford University Press, 2005
- The Burden of Democracy Penguin, 2003

Academic offices
| Preceded by Rudrangshu Mukherjee | Vice-Chancellor of Ashoka University; 2017-2019 | Succeeded by Malabika Sarkar |
