= Saikat Majumdar =

Indian novelist, critic and academic

Professor Saikat Majumdar
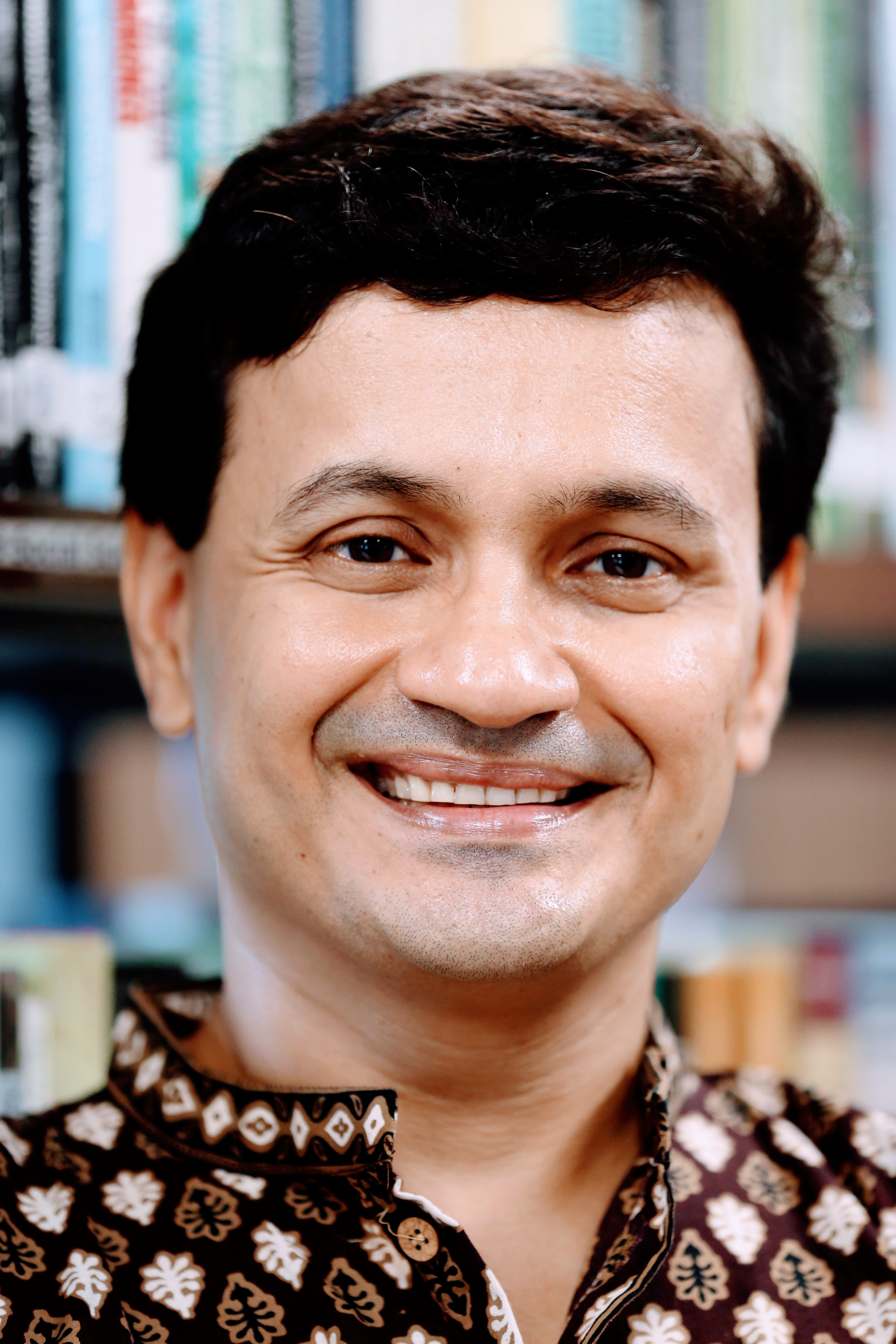
- Born: Calcutta, West Bengal, India
- Occupations: Novelist; critic; academic
- Writing career
- Language: English
- Notable works: Silverfish (2007); The Firebird (2015); College: Pathways of Possibility (2018); The Scent of God (2019); The Middle Finger (2022); The Remains of the Body (2024); The Amateur-Self-Making And the Humanities in the Postcolony (2024)
- Website: saikatmajumdar.com

Saikat Majumdar is an Indian novelist, critic and academic. A professor of English and Creative Writing at Ashoka University, Majumdar is the author of five novels: Silverfish (2007), The Firebird (2015), The Scent of God (2019), The Middle Finger (2022), and The Remains of the Body (2024). His novels primarily deal with the themes and subjects like religion, memory, sexuality, history and education. He writes on literature and education for the Los Angeles Review of Books, Telegraph, Times Higher Education, The Hindu, Hindustan Times, Outlook, Indian Express and other publications.

== Biography ==
Majumdar initially studied in Calcutta, India, and then in the United States, where he taught for several years. He obtained his PhD at Rutgers University in 2005 under Derek Attridge with his doctoral dissertation Subaltern Modernisms: The Poetics and Politics of Banality in Transnational Fictions. Currently, he is a professor of English and Creative Writing at Ashoka University and is head of the department of English at the university. Prior to that, he taught world literature at Stanford University for nine years.

In 2017 Majumdar was a Fellow at the Humanities Centre at Wellesley College, Massachusetts. In Spring 2023, he was a Fellow at the Stellenbosch Institute of Advanced Study (STIAS), South Africa. Majumdar was a Fellow at Institute of Advanced Study at the Central European University in Spring 2025. He is also a Research Fellow in English at the University of the Free State in South Africa. In April 2025, Majumdar has been elected a Member of the International Association of University Professors in English (IAUPE). He is scheduled to address the association at its next Annual Conference in Munich in July 2026.

Majumdar's research interests cover topics including literature of modern and contemporary world, modernism, colonial and postcolonial studies, the novel and narrative theory, critical university studies, the history of criticism, fiction and non-fiction writing.

He has contributed articles in The Hindu, Times Higher Education, Hindustan Times, Indian Express, The Caravan, Scroll, Telegraph, Times of India. He writes columns for Outlook and Los Angeles Review of Books. He edited the special issue, Little India, for the American Book Review.

== Works ==
Majumdar's early works of fiction were published by Writers Workshop, Calcutta including two short story collections: Infinitum Archipelago (1994) and Happy Birthday to You (1996); and two novellas: Hello Goodbye (1996) and Diminuendo (1997).

=== Novels ===
Majumdar's novels are written in evocative and lyrical style, and mainly deal with the themes and subjects like religion, memory, sexuality, education, and history. His novels primarily take place in the Indian city of Calcutta and surrounding areas.

Majumdar's debut novel, Silverfish, was published in 2007. It brings together two stories: a single day in the life of a retired schoolteacher, Milan Sen, in 1980's Calcutta, and several decades in the life of Kamal, a woman in an aristocratic family from 19th century Bengal, who is married and widowed young. Milan finds the manuscript of Kamal's diary and reads the torn pages of Kamal's memoirs as he spends the day fighting bureaucracy and crime in order to get his pension from the Communist government of the state. The stories of Kamal's suffering, including her widowhood and the death of her son in the hands of the British, seem to echo with Milan's own suffering as their voices eventually merge at the tragic end of Milan's day.

His next novel The Firebird was published in 2015. It was published in the US under the title Play House in 2017. It was featured in the Daily Telegraph's Best Books of 2015 and was a finalist for the Mumbai Film Festival Word to Screen Market and the Bangalore Literature Festival Fiction Award.

The Firebird is set in the backdrop of Indian theatre (in north Calcutta) and take place in mid to late-1980's. It tells the story of a small boy, Ori, who grows up in a once-affluent family now trying to maintain its social status in a conservative north Calcutta neighborhood. Its main focus is Ori's relation with his mother, Garima, a stage actress, whose profession evokes moral suspicion in the family and the neighborhood, and how that suspicion eventually shapes Ori's destructive relation with the art form of theatre. Writer Sumana Roy praised the storytelling and the central metaphor of the novel, death. Sheila Hattangdi reviewed The Firebird in the American Book Review and praised the characterisation and the presentation of scenes, writing: "he [Majumdar] has the remarkable ability to get into the skin of his characters while remaining somewhat detached, and he asks the reader to assume an active position in confronting the society that the characters come face to face with, so much so that the voice of the narrative becomes something far greater than the sum of its parts". Writer Hansda Sowvendra Shekhar praised the 'atmospheric' description of student life and the author's writing. He wrote that Majumdar's writing is so subtle that some parts of this novel warrant a second reading. Shekhar called the novel 'a revelation draped in sensuousness'.

Majumdar's third novel The Scent of God, a bildungsroman, was written during 2015 and 2018, and was published in 2019. It narrates a love story between two teenage boys (Anirvan/Yogi and Kajol) in an all-boys' boarding school run by Hindu monastic order. Anirvan, a young student, is fascinated by the music and silence of spiritual life. He dreams of becoming a monk. But as he seeks his dream, he finds himself drawn to a fellow student, and they come together to form an intimate and unspeakable relationship. The novel is set in late 20th-century when same-sex relationship constitute a crime. The novel received critical acclaim upon release and was listed as the Best Romance Novels of 2019 by the Times of India. It was shortlisted for the Mathrubhumi Book of the Year Award.

Author Aditya Sudarshan praised the novel's narrative and called it 'fluent' and 'significant'. Imran Ali Khan, writing for Scroll.in, noted that the novel is potent with promise but remains opaque. He noted that author's efforts to think about the delicate lines between the sensory and the erotic are perhaps too thin and they remain unexplored. He praised the 'beautiful narrative' and storytelling. Lamat R Hasan, writing for Hindustan Times, praised the novel for its 'powerful' writing, and wrote that "every word is carefully crafted and the subtle carelessness in every sentence opens an ocean of interpretations. The poetry-prose captures the tension of the two entangled world orders, spiritual and material".

Writer Sohinee Roy reviewed the novel in The Wire. She termed the novel as an "intimate and aesthetic response to religious life of India". According to her the novel offers a way to understand why dismissing religion as backward has not prevented it from intruding on and usurping our secular existence. The novel also presents a counter to limited visions of religion.

Majumdar's fourth novel The Middle Finger was published in early 2022. It is a contemporary college campus novel about poetry, performance, and mentorship. An examination of the teacher-student relationship through the lens of ancient myths, particularly that of Drona and Ekalavya from The Mahabharata.

Writer and Professor, Lantz Fleming Miller reviewed the novel in LARB. He called it "a masterpiece of subtlety and gentle ellipsis". He says "Another striking feature of the book is Majumdar’s sculpted language, at once sensual and sharply honed. Each sentence is a poem in itself, and some especially glimmer with insight.”

Trailblazer policymaker, and an officer of the Indian Administrative Services (IAS), Uma Mahadevan-Dasgupta calls The Middle Finger "a white brilliance" in The Hindu. She says, "Saikat Majumdar’s latest novel is a pointed examination of the ethics of modern education". She asks "Is there poetry for those who have not been ‘taught’ to read it? Are there ways in which poetry can reach out and ‘touch’ a reader, as Socrates says to Agathon? This is the question at the heart of this novel. The answer, of course, is yes; because, as one of the characters realises, “There are different ways one can exist in the world.”

Senior Deputy Editor of Frontline Suhrid Sankar Chattopadhyay says "Saikat Majumdar has emerged as one of the most powerful and important voices of his generation in Indian literature in English. Through his beautiful and often dark writings, Majumdar has not only explored the complexities of human relationships in their different socio-political milieus but has also gently questioned universally accepted social norms, traditions, and behaviour." In an interview "The sensory filters of politics: In conversation with Saikat Majumdar", when asked by Chattopadhyay about The Middle Finger sounding controversial, Majumdar says "perhaps the title does; but it actually comes from the retelling of a myth. At the heart of this novel is the nature of the relation between a teacher and a student, the many confusing shades of that relationship. Who gets close access to a teacher, to certain kinds of education, and why? What are the limits of friendship and intimacy between a teacher and a student? What is the connection between the artistic, the intellectual, and the erotic?"

== Critical works ==
Majumdar's first critical work Prose of the World: Modernism and the Banality of Empire was published in 2013 by Columbia University Press. It presents a study of Anglophone world literature, and analyses how banality, boredom, and the quotidian shape twentieth-century literature. In the book, the author argues that the innovative narrative energy of modernism was driven by the quotidian and shaped especially by its engagement with a uniquely colonial experience of banality.

His book College: Pathways of Possibility (2018) is an exploration into the Indian education system through conversations, reminiscences, research references, and critical analysis. Critic Anjum Hasan cited it as "a bold critique of Indian higher education system".

== Recognition ==
Majumdar's The Scent of God (2019) was one of Times of India's 20 Most Talked About Indian Books of 2019, and a Finalist for the Mathrubhumi Book of the Year Award 2020. His book Prose of the World: Modernism and the Banality of Empire was a finalist for the Modernist Studies Association Annual Book Prize in 2014. His novel The Firebird is one of Telegraph's Best Books of 2015 and a finalist for the Atta-Galatta Bangalore Literature Festival Fiction Prize in 2015 and the Mumbai Film Festival Word-to-Screen Market in 2016. Majumdar was named a Fellow at the Suzy Newhouse Center for the Humanities at Wellesley College in 2017 ". The Middle Finger was Longlisted for the Atta Galata-Bangalore Literature Festival Book Prize-2022. In 2022, Majumdar was named a Fellow at the Stellenbosch Institute for Advanced Study "" in South Africa. "". In Spring 2025, he was a Senior Core Fellow at Institute of Advanced Study at the Central European University in Budapest.

== List of publications ==
- Silverfish (HarperCollins, 2007)
- The Firebird/Play House (Hachette, 2015 & 2017; The Permanent Press, 2017)
- College: Pathways of Possibility (Bloomsbury, 2018)
- The Scent of God (Simon & Schuster, 2019)
- Prose of the World: Modernism and the Banality of Empire (Columbia University Press & Orient Blackswan, 2013 & 2015)
- The Middle Finger (Simon & Schuster, 2022)
- The Remains of the Body (Penguin Random House, 2024)
- The Amateur-Self-Making and the Humanities in the Postcolony (Bloomsbury, 2024)

=== Edited works ===
- The Critic as Amateur (Bloomsbury, 2019; co-edited with Aarthi Vadde)
- Special Issue: American Book Review ("Little India")
