= Aparna Vaidik =

Indian historian, author, and educator

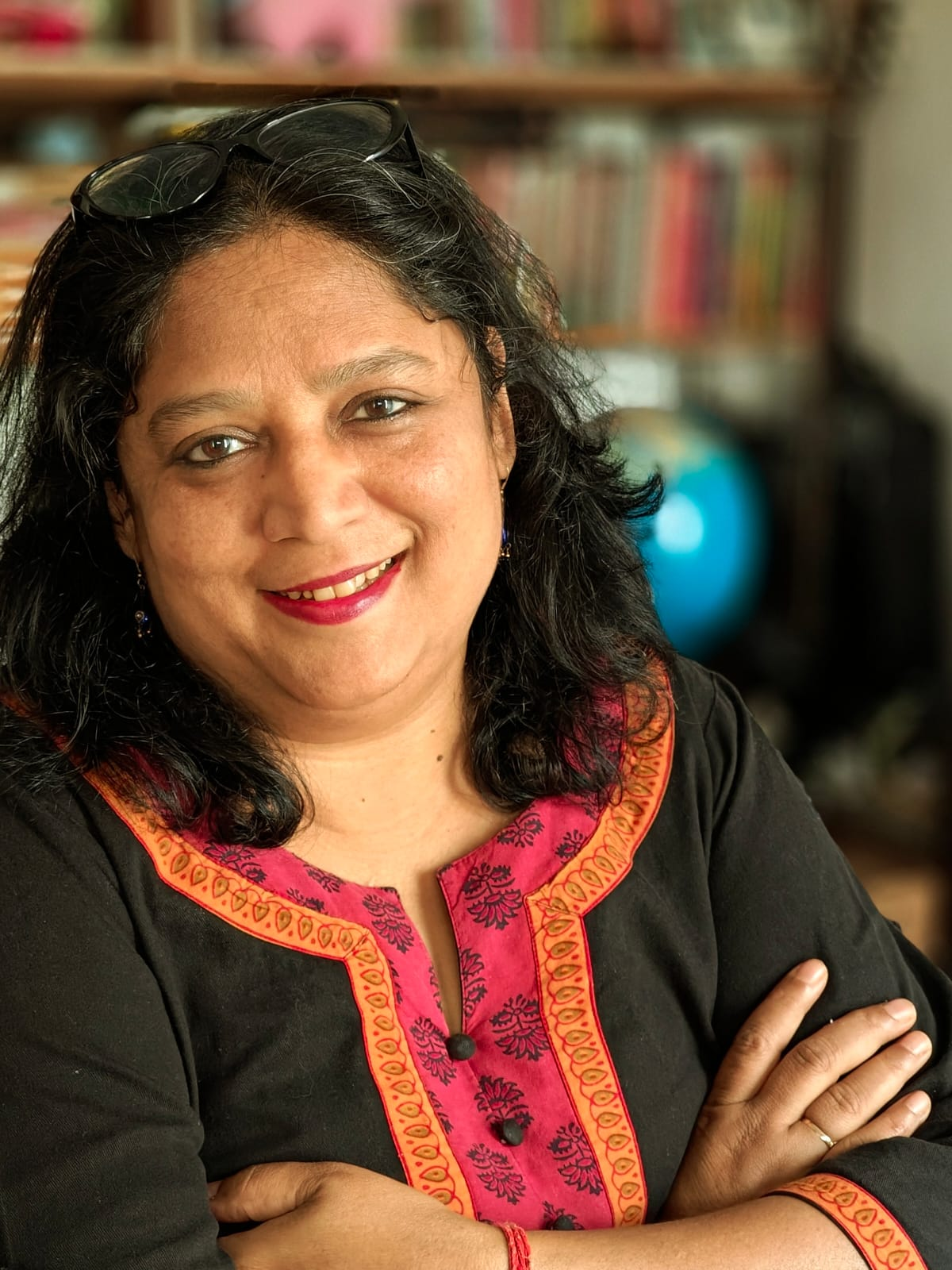
- Born: 22 October; Indore, Madhya Pradesh, India
- Occupations: Historian, Professor, Author, Journalist
- Writing career
- Period: 2000 – present
- Subjects: Indian history, Indian politics, World history and politics
- Website: www.ashoka.edu.in/welcome/faculty#!/aparna-vaidik-17

Aparna Vaidik (born 22 October) is an Indian historian, author, and educator. Vaidik is a scholar with significant public presence known for her extensive writings on history of the Andaman islands, the Indian revolutionaries, histories of social and mythic violence, and histories of seditious conspiracies.

== Early life ==
She was born in Indore, Madhya Pradesh. She is the daughter of an academic, professor Vedwati Vaidik, and a prominent journalist/political commentator, Ved Pratap Vaidik.

Aparna Vaidik's debut book, Imperial Andamans: Colonial Encounter and Island History, was published as part of the Cambridge Imperial and Postcolonial Studies Series of Palgrave Macmillan when she was a historian at Georgetown University in Washington, DC. It examines the penal history of the Andaman Islands. Her second book, My Son’s Inheritance: A Secret History of Blood Justice and Lynchings in India, has drawn international attention. Her third book, Waiting for Swaraj: Inner Lives of Indian Revolutionaries was published by Cambridge University Press in 2021. A fifth book on a famous trial of the Indian revolutionaries in during British India, Revolutionaries on Trial: Sedition, Betrayal and Martyrdom, was published by Aleph in 2024.

== Academic career as a historian ==
Vaidik earned a bachelor's degree in history from St. Stephen’s College, University of Delhi, summa cum laude. She won the Westcott Memorial Prize, E. R. Kapadia Memorial Prize, Shankar Prasad Memorial Gold Medal, and the Dip Chand Memorial Prize for distinguished work in history. At the University of Cambridge she also studied history for a master's degree, with a thesis on Lord Curzon’s cultural policy that won the Dorothy Foster Sturman Prize. Her PhD in History is from Jawaharlal Nehru University's Centre for Historical Studies. She taught for several years in the University of Delhi and at Georgetown University in Washington, DC, before returning to India to accept a position as the founding faculty member of the history department and programme at Ashoka University. The Indian Council for Historical Research has supported her research with grants, as have Georgetown University, the Charles Wallace Trust, and the Andrew Mellon Foundation.

== Philanthropy and public service ==
Literacy, libraries, and a free, world-class education for all make up an important part of Vadik's public life. Vaidik is the Trustee President of the Rameshwardass Dharmarth Trust that was set up by her maternal grandfather in 1967. The Trust is known widely for its cultural and educational activities and its building, Dharam Bhavan, is a local landmark. The Trust has set up a community library for children with The Community Library Project.

== Selected works ==
=== Books ===
- Revolutionaries on Trial: Sedition, Betrayal and Martyrdom, Aleph, 2024.
- Waiting for Swaraj: Inner Lives of Indian Revolutionaries, Cambridge University Press, 2021.
- My Son’s Inheritance: A Secret History of Blood Justice and Lynchings in India, Aleph, 2020.
- Imperial Andamans: Colonial Encounter and Island History, Cambridge Imperial and Post-Colonial Studies Series of Palgrave Macmillan, 2010.

=== Journal articles ===
- "Recognizing Invisible Oppression with the Drama Pyramid: Adding the Bystander Role and the Cultural Parent to the Drama Triangle". Transactional Analysis Journal (co-authored with Aruna Gopakumar), 2024.
- "History: A Handmaid's Tale". History and Theory, 2023.
- "Rewriting World History in the Classroom: Pedagogical Dispatches from India", Journal of Asian World History (co-authored with Gwen Kelly). 2019.
- "History of a Renegade Revolutionary: Revolutionism and Betrayal in British India", Postcolonial Studies, 2013.
- "Settling the Convict: Matrimony and Family in the Andamans", Studies in History, JNU, 2006.
