= Sumana Roy =

Indian writer and poet

- Born: Jalpaiguri, West Bengal, India
- Education: Siliguri College, University of North Bengal
- Occupations: Novelist; short-story writer; poet; essayist
- Writing career
- Notable works: How I Became a Tree (2017); Missing: A Novel (2019); Out of Syllabus (2019); My Mother's Lover and Other Stories
- Website: Official website

Sumana Roy is an Indian writer, nature lover and poet. Her works include How I Became a Tree (2017), a work of non-fiction; Missing (2019), a novel; Out of Syllabus (2019), a collection of poems; and My Mother's Lover and Other Stories (2019), a short story collection. Her unpublished novel Love in the Chicken's Neck was longlisted for the Man Asian Literary Prize (2008). Her first book, How I Became a Tree, a work of non-fiction, was shortlisted for the 2017 Shakti Bhatt Prize.

== Life ==
Sumana Roy, an associate professor at Ashoka University, is from Siliguri, a city in Darjeeling district of West Bengal, India, where she spent most of her life. She studied at Mahbert High School in Siliguri and Pratt Memorial School, Kolkata, after which she went on to study English literature at Siliguri College and the University of North Bengal. She taught English literature at a few government colleges in West Bengal, before she joined Ashoka University as associate professor of English and Creative Writings. She was appointed as the Carson Fellow at the Rachel Carson Center for Environment and Society, LMU Munich in 2018. She was a Full Time Visiting Fellow at the South Asia Program, Cornell University the same year and a fellow at the Plant Humanities Lab, Dumbarton Oaks, Harvard University.

== Works ==
Roy writes a monthly column, Treelogy, in The Hindu Business Line about plant life. Her poems and essays are published in Granta, The Caravan, Guernica Himal Southasian, Los Angeles Review of Books, Prairie Schooner, American Book Review, The White Review Journal of South Asian Studies, Journal of Life Writing.

Roy's first work was a novel, Love in the Chicken's Neck, which remains unpublished. It is a story about friendship. Set in the university town of Shibmandir, it moves between Darjeeling, the Dooars, and Siliguri, through their difficult histories, histories of political movements, the demand for Gorkhaland and Kamtapur among them, that affect the relationships between the three friends, Tirna, Nirjhar, and Balram.

She published her first book How I Became a Tree, a non-fiction work, in 2017. With the use of first-person narrative, the book presents various aspects of plant life. How I Became a Tree was translated into French as Comment Je Suis Devenue Un Arbre by Patrick Devaux. It was translated into German as Wie ich ein Baum wurde by Grete Osterwald.

Her next book, Missing: A Novel (2019), is the modern retelling of the Hindu epic Ramayana. Based on real life incident, 2012 Guwahati molestation of teenage girl, and set over seven days, Missing narrates the story of Kobita, an academic and social activist in her fifties, who goes missing as she goes out to help a girl being molested by thirty men, leaving behind her blind husband and poet Nayan Sengupta along with the domestic helps of Bimalda, Shibhu, Ratan and Bani. The novel deals with the theme of waiting, drawing striking parallels with Ramayana, the epic par excellence that deals with the theme of waiting as well where Sita goes missing and Rama waits for her to get back. Kobita remains missing throughout the novel.

After Missing: A Novel (2019), Roy published her first poetry collection, Out of Syllabus. The title alludes to the structural framework of her sequence of compositions, the various subjects studied in a school syllabus, with the poems grouped according to the type of lesson taught. Each topic is refracted through the lens of some aspect of the broader social world outside the classroom. Mathematics lends itself to a lyrical reflection on the arithmetic of marriage rules, for example.

Out of Syllabus received positively from Stanford University's emerita professor of literature Marjorie Perloff and University of California at Irvine's emeritus professor J. Hillis Miller. For Perloff, Roy's ability to range over a multitude of scientific disciplines – Chemistry, Physics, Biology, Geography, History, Botany and Art – in order to tease out the poignant anatomies of feelings bound up with love, longing and loss while maintaining an aesthetic detachment, was reminiscent of the works of Sylvia Plath, but tempered by a degree of philosophical distance unlike the anger driving Plath's oeuvre. J. Hillis Miller noted the dialectical interplay between the rational order of the book's formal organization as evidenced by the clinical list of syllabus items that groups the poems, and the exuberant figures of speech characteristic of their imagery.

My Mother’s Lover and Other Stories, her short story collection, was published in 2019. Roy edited Animalia Indica: The Finest Animal Stories In Indian Literature (2019), a collection of 21 animal short stories written in English as well translated from native vernacular languages.

== Awards and nominations ==
Roy's unpublished novel Love in the Chicken’s Neck was longlisted for the Man Asian Literary Prize (2008). Her first book, How I Became a Tree, a work of non-fiction, was shortlisted for the 2017 Shakti Bhatt Prize. It was shortlisted for the Sahitya Akademi Award for the year 2019 and 2020.
