= Dipyaman Ganguly =

Indian biologist

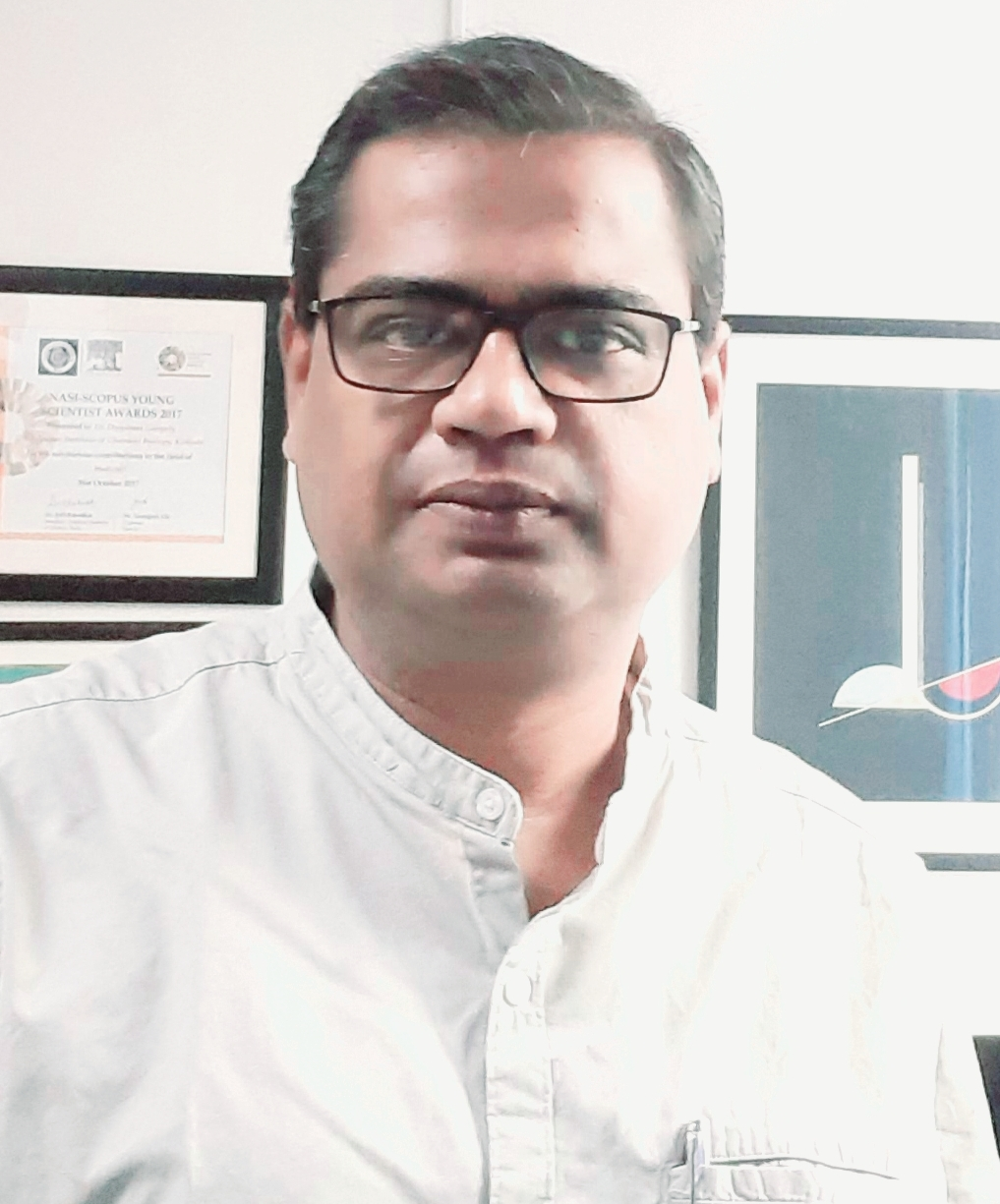
- Born: 25 October; Baharampur, West Bengal, India
- Education: Rahara Ramakrishna Mission Boys’ Home High School; Medical College and Hospital, Kolkata; Indian Institute of Chemical Biology; University of Texas MD Anderson Cancer Center; Columbia University Medical Center
- Known for: Studies on Human Immunology
- Awards: 2013 Ramanujan Fellowship; 2017 Swarnajayanti Fellowship; 2017 NASI-Scopus Young Scientist Award; 2017/18 N-BIOS Prize; 2019 CDRI Award for Excellence in Drug Research; 2019 Merck Young Scientist Award; 2022 Shanti Swarup Bhatnagar Prize
- Scientific career
- Fields: Immunology; Cell biology
- Workplaces: Ashoka University

Dipyaman Ganguly is an Indian physician-scientist immunologist and cell biologist, currently a professor in the Department of Biology, Ashoka University. The Council of Scientific and Industrial Research, the apex agency of the Government of India for scientific research, awarded him the Shanti Swarup Bhatnagar Prize for Science and Technology, one of the highest Indian science awards for his contributions to Medical Sciences in 2022.

Ganguly graduated in medicine from Medical College and Hospital, Kolkata in 2001 but shifted his focus to biomedical research and joined the Institute of Genomics and Integrative Biology as a clinical associate. In 2003, he joined Indian Institute of Chemical Biology for doctoral research as a research scholar which earned him his first PhD in 2006. Moving to the US, he carried on his research at University of Texas MD Anderson Cancer Center and received another PhD from the University of Texas Health Science Center at Houston. His post-doctoral work was at the Columbia University Medical Center as an SLE Foundation Fellow He was also a Swarnajayanti Fellow of the Department of Science and Technology, and was formerly a Ramanujan Fellow of the Science and Engineering Research Board of the Department of Science and Technology.

== Scientific contribution ==
Research interests of Ganguly lab are exploring the role of dendritic cells in autoreactive inflammatory contexts, deciphering molecular regulation of innate immune response and exploring the role of mechanical cues in immune cells. Researchers from Ganguly Lab recently discovered a novel regulatory module involving the Piezo1 mechanosensors in human T cells, driven by mechanical cues. They also provided the first evidence for involvement of plasmacytoid dendritic cells in obesity and associated metabolic syndrome in humans. Previous work by Dipyaman Ganguly led to discovery of the key initiation events in pathogenesis of the skin autoimmunity in Psoriasis, as well as first identification of dying neutrophils as the major source of nuclear antigens in systemic lupus, which was featured in Nature Reviews Key Advances in Medicine for the year 2012. Ganguly lab has also interest in development of new therapies for autoimmune diseases. Ganguly lab also took interest in performing research on immunology of COVID-19 disease and ran a randomized control trial on convalescent plasma therapy.

== Awards ==
The Department of Biotechnology of the Government of India awarded him the National Bioscience Award for Career Development, one of the highest Indian science awards, for his contributions to biosciences, in 2017/18. He is also a recipient of the Merck Young Scientist Award, the CDRI Award for Excellence in Drug Research from CSIR-Central Drug Research Institute, Swarnajayanthi Fellowship of the Department of Science and Technology and the NASI-Scopus Young Scientist Award of the Elsevier. He was awarded the Shanti Swarup Bhatnagar Prize for Science and Technology in Medical Sciences in the year 2022.

== Public outreach ==
Ganguly is an enthusiast for public outreach of science in India, an avid stargazer and a public commentator and popular columnist on issues on science and health.

== Selected bibliography ==
- Sisirak V, Ganguly D, Lewis KL, Couillault C, Tanaka L, Bolland S, D'Agati V, Elkon KB, Reizis B (September 2014). "Genetic evidence for the role of plasmacytoid dendritic cells in systemic lupus erythematosus". The Journal of Experimental Medicine. 211 (10): 1969–76. doi:10.1084/jem.20132522. PMC 4172218. PMID 25180061.
- Lande R, Ganguly D, Facchinetti V, Frasca L, Conrad C, Gregorio J, Meller S, Chamilos G, Sebasigari R, Riccieri V, Bassett R, Amuro H, Fukuhara S, Ito T, Liu YJ, Gilliet M (March 2011). "Neutrophils activate plasmacytoid dendritic cells by releasing self-DNA-peptide complexes in systemic lupus erythematosus". Science Translational Medicine. 3 (73): 73ra19. doi:10.1126/scitranslmed.3001180. PMC 3399524. PMID 21389263.
- Rahaman O, Bhattacharya R, Liu C, Raychaudhuri D, Ghosh AR, Bandopadhyay P, Pal S, Goswami RP, Sircar G, Ghosh P, Ganguly D (March 2019). "Cutting Edge: Dysregulated Endocannabinoid-Rheostat for Plasmacytoid Dendritic Cell Activation in a Systemic Lupus Endophenotype". Journal of Immunology. 202 (6): 1674–1679. doi:10.4049/jimmunol.1801521. PMID 30728209.
- Liu C, Raychaudhuri D, Paul B, Chakrabarty Y, Ghosh AR, Rahaman O, Talukdar A, Ganguly D (February 2018). "Cutting Edge: Piezo1 Mechanosensors Optimize Human T Cell Activation". Journal of Immunology. 200 (4): 1255–1260. doi:10.4049/jimmunol.1701118. PMID 29330322.
- Ganguly D (January 2018). "Do Type I Interferons Link Systemic Autoimmunities and Metabolic Syndrome in a Pathogenetic Continuum?". Trends in Immunology. 39 (1): 28–43. doi:10.1016/j.it.2017.07.001. PMID 28826817.
- Ghosh AR, Bhattacharya R, Bhattacharya S, Nargis T, Rahaman O, Duttagupta P, Raychaudhuri D, Liu CS, Roy S, Ghosh P, Khanna S, Chaudhuri T, Tantia O, Haak S, Bandyopadhyay S, Mukhopadhyay S, Chakrabarti P, Ganguly D (November 2016). "Adipose Recruitment and Activation of Plasmacytoid Dendritic Cells Fuel Metaflammation". Diabetes. 65 (11): 3440–3452. doi:10.2337/db16-0331. PMID 27561727.
- Meller S, Di Domizio J, Voo KS, Friedrich HC, Chamilos G, Ganguly D, Conrad C, Gregorio J, Le Roy D, Roger T, Ladbury JE, Homey B, Watowich S, Modlin RL, Kontoyiannis DP, Liu YJ, Arold ST, Gilliet M (September 2015). "T(H)17 cells promote microbial killing and innate immune sensing of DNA via interleukin 26". Nature Immunology. 16 (9): 970–979. doi:10.1038/ni.3211. PMC 4776746. PMID 26168081.
- Ganguly D, Haak S, Sisirak V, Reizis B (August 2013). "The role of dendritic cells in autoimmunity". Nature Reviews Immunology. 13 (8): 566–577. doi:10.1038/nri3477. PMC 4160805. PMID 23827956.
- Ganguly D, Chamilos G, Lande R, Gregorio J, Meller S, Facchinetti V, Homey B, Barrat FJ, Zal T, Gilliet M (August 2009). "Self-RNA-antimicrobial peptide complexes activate human dendritic cells through TLR7 and TLR8". The Journal of Experimental Medicine. 206 (9): 1983–1994. doi:10.1084/jem.20090480. PMC 2737167. PMID 19703986.
- Mukherjee A, Raychaudhuri D, Sinha BP, Kundu B, Mitra M, Paul B, Bandopadhyay P, Ganguly D, Talukdar A (May 2020). "A Chemical Switch for Transforming a Purine Agonist for Toll-like Receptor 7 to a Clinically Relevant Antagonist". Journal of Medicinal Chemistry. 63 (9): 4776–4789. doi:10.1021/acs.jmedchem.0c00011. PMID 32302115. S2CID 215809717.

== See also ==
- T helper 17 cell
- Dendritic cell
