= Ashoka University =

Private university in Haryana, India

Coordinates: 28.9468°N 77.1016°E

- Type: Private research university
- Established: 2014; 12 years ago
- Affiliations: UGC, ACU
- Chancellor: Rudrangshu Mukherjee
- Vice-Chancellor: Rishikesha T. Krishnan
- Academic staff: 200
- Students: 4,500
- Location: Sonipat, Haryana, India
- Campus: Original campus: 25 acres (10 ha) Expansion announced in 2021: 27 acres (11 ha)
- Colours: Red & Blue
- Website: www.ashoka.edu.in

Ashoka University is a private research university located in Sonipat, Haryana, providing a liberal education in the humanities, social sciences, and natural sciences. It was founded in 2014 and is based on the model of collective philanthropy, with 200+ founders across various industries.

== History ==
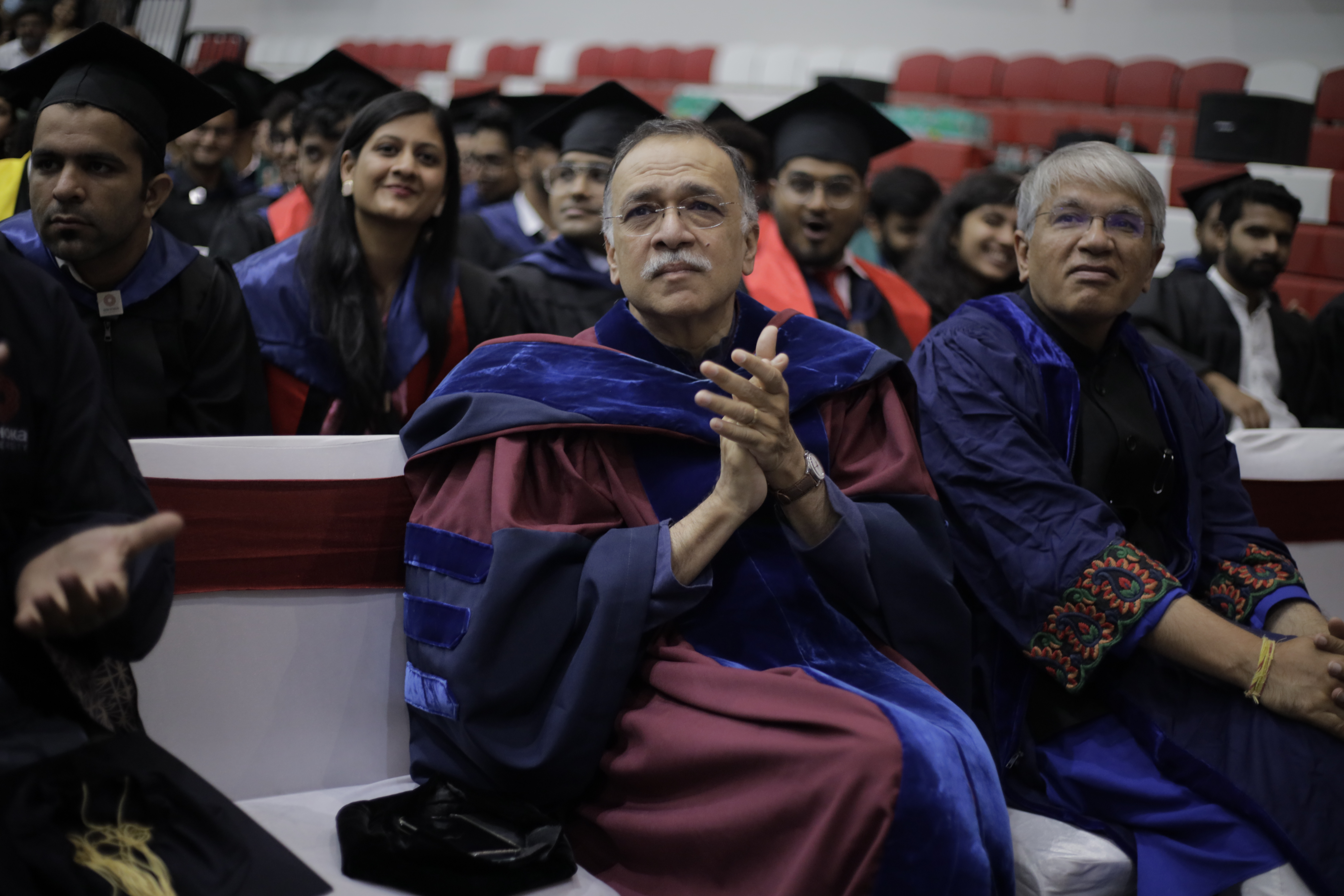
Founder Pramath Raj Sinha at the convocation ceremony of Ashoka University

The institution was named after the Mauryan emperor Ashoka. It was conceived as an idea after Sanjeev Bikhchandani and Ashish Dhawan approached Pramath Raj Sinha, a former dean of the Indian School of Business, for his assistance in setting up the university. The project was code-named Project Nobel, referring to the founders' aspiration to produce future Nobel Prize laureates. It was set up by a private limited company called "International Foundation For Research and Education".

Initial discussions aimed to set up an institute of engineering and technology that could match the reputation of leading institutions in the field. Ashoka's founders signed a memorandum of understanding with the University of Pennsylvania School of Engineering and Applied Science. The founders' list named 22 people, including Ashok Trivedi, Dilip Shanghvi, Nirmal Jain, Sanjeev Bikhchandani and Jerry Rao. The list later grew to 46.

Ashoka later expanded its focus to provide education in the liberal arts, combining instruction in the natural sciences, social sciences, and the humanities. Trivedi fortified this decision by setting up the Trivedi Centre for Political Data (TCPD) in partnership with the University of Michigan. In 2020, Ashoka University established the Trivedi School of Biosciences with virologist Shahid Jameel as the first director of the centre.

== Campus ==
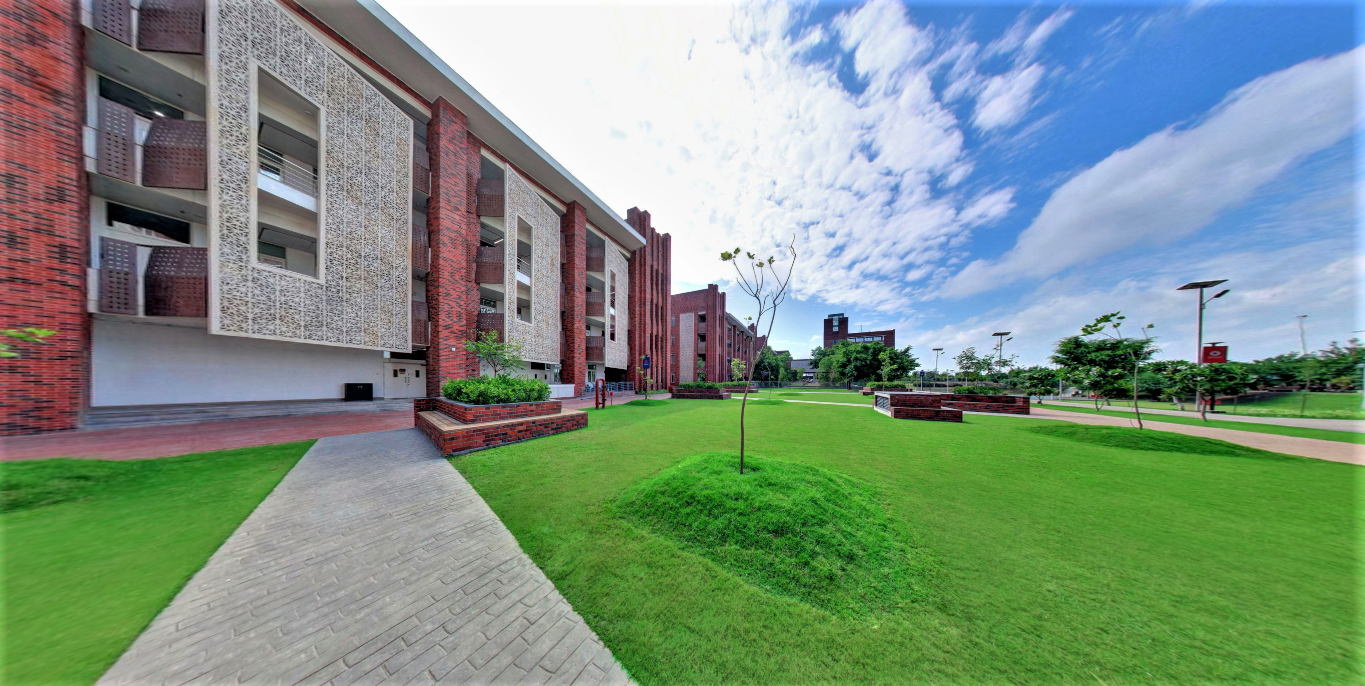
Campus view of Ashoka University

Ashoka University's 25-acre (10 ha) original campus is in the Rajiv Gandhi Education City in Sonipat, Haryana. It was designed by the American architecture firm Perkins Eastman. In September 2021, the university laid the foundation stone for an adjacent 27-acre (11 ha) campus, with plans to increase its student capacity to 6,000 by 2027.

== Governance ==
Ashoka University is supported by philanthropic donations. It also charges tuition and other student fees. There are no hierarchies present in the founding group in terms of decision-making. In addition to the chancellor, vice-chancellor and deans, Ashoka is guided by an academic council of academics and scholars. The council sets the university's academic standard, advising on matters of curriculum, faculty hiring, and research.

The first chancellor was Andre Beteille, who served from 2014. The first vice-chancellor was Rudrangshu Mukherjee. In 2017 Beteille resigned, to be replaced by Mukherjee, and Pratap Bhanu Mehta was appointed vice-chancellor from July 2017. Mehta resigned in July 2019 and was replaced by Malabika Sarkar. Sarkar stepped down on 1 January 2023 and was replaced by Somak Raychaudhury. In March 2026, Somak Raychaudhury decided to step down as Vice Chancellor and not continue for a second term. Prof. Rishikesha T. Krishnan was appointed as the VC on 15 June 2026 and will be assuming office on 1 August 2026.

== Academics ==
The university offers various programmes at undergraduate, post graduate, diploma, and PhD level in subjects such as economics, chemistry, english, and liberal studies.

=== Chief Minister's Good Governance Associates (CMGGA) ===
The CMGGA programme is a collaboration between the Government of Haryana and Ashoka University. The associates are trained, after which they are posted in each of the 22 districts of Haryana for 12 months. During their tenure, they work with the district officials to drive changes at the grassroots levels.

=== Centres ===
Ashoka University has various specialised centres in areas such as translation, economics, climate change, etc.

== Admissions ==
The undergraduate admission procedure includes an application form, an on-spot essay, an interview, and an aptitude objective test named Ashoka Aptitude Test. It also accepts the SAT, one of the first universities in India to do so. Ashoka University is a Founding Member institution of the India Global Higher Education Alliance, which addresses how admissions policies among Indian and non-Indian institutions influence access and equity in higher education.

== Rankings ==
University rankings

Global – Overall
- QS World: 1201-1400 (2026)

Global – Business and economics
- QS Economics: 551-700 (2026)

Global – Liberal arts
- QS Social Sciences and Management: 301-375 (2026)

Regional – Overall
- QS Asia: 396

In 2026, the QS World University Rankings ranked the university 396th in Asia.

== Institutional collaborations ==
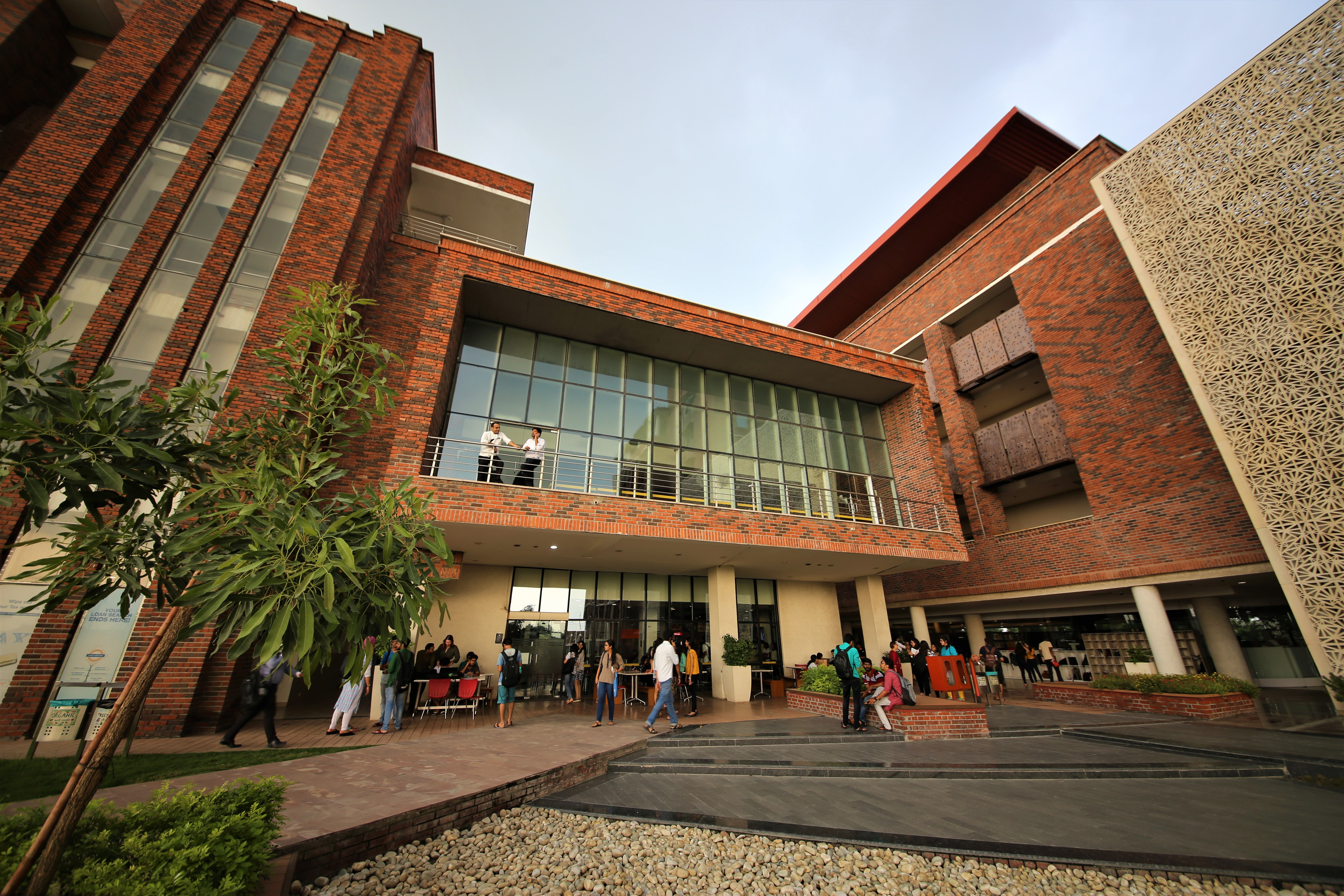
Ashoka University Snapshot

Ashoka University has a number of international institutional collaborations with university partners including University of Pennsylvania, University of Michigan, Yale, Duke, King's College London, HEC Paris, Sciences Po and many others.

The University of Cambridge and Ashoka University have signed a Memorandum of Understanding in recognition of their mutual interest in promoting and furthering academic links between the two institutions. The Office of Global Education and Strategic Programmes (GESP) at Ashoka University signed a MoU with National University of Singapore (NUS) in January 2022.

Ashoka University has also joined a consortium of five Indian Institutes of Technology (IIT Delhi, IIT Kanpur, IIT Bombay, IIT Jodhpur and IIT BHU, Varanasi) to sign a Memorandum of Understanding (MoU) with University at Buffalo in New York. The objective of this partnership is to establish a multiparty collaborative framework for long-term multi-institutional and international collaboration in educational and research fields. The research focus will be nanomaterials and nanotechnology, biotechnology, advanced sensors, photonics and cyber-physical systems including artificial intelligence. Ashoka University has further entered into a MoU with Max Healthcare Institute to initiate long-term, high-quality research collaborations. The collaboration aims to build a joint research program on genome analysis and data analysis that will include AI, ML and deep learning of various genetic and life-style diseases.

== Notable academics ==
=== Arts and Humanities ===
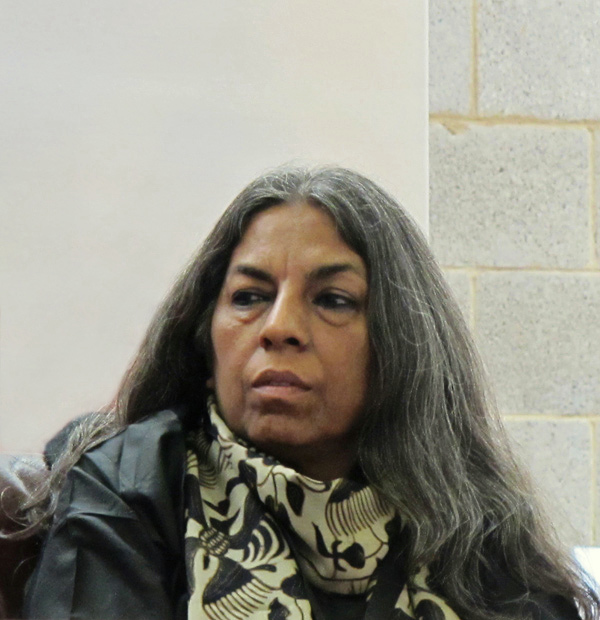
Urvashi Butalia

- Urvashi Butalia – feminist writer and publisher
- Amit Chaudhuri – novelist
- Jonathan Gil Harris – writer, literary critic
- Navtej Johar – dancer, choreographer and yoga exponent
- Rita Kothari – author and translator
- Clancy Martin – philosopher
- Saikat Majumdar – novelist
- Janice Pariat – poet and writer
- Sumana Roy – poet and writer
- Justin McCarthy - Bharatanatyam exponent
- Arindam Chakrabarti — philosopher
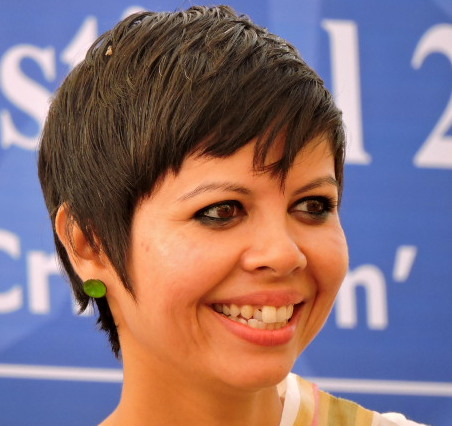
  Janice Pariat

=== Social science ===
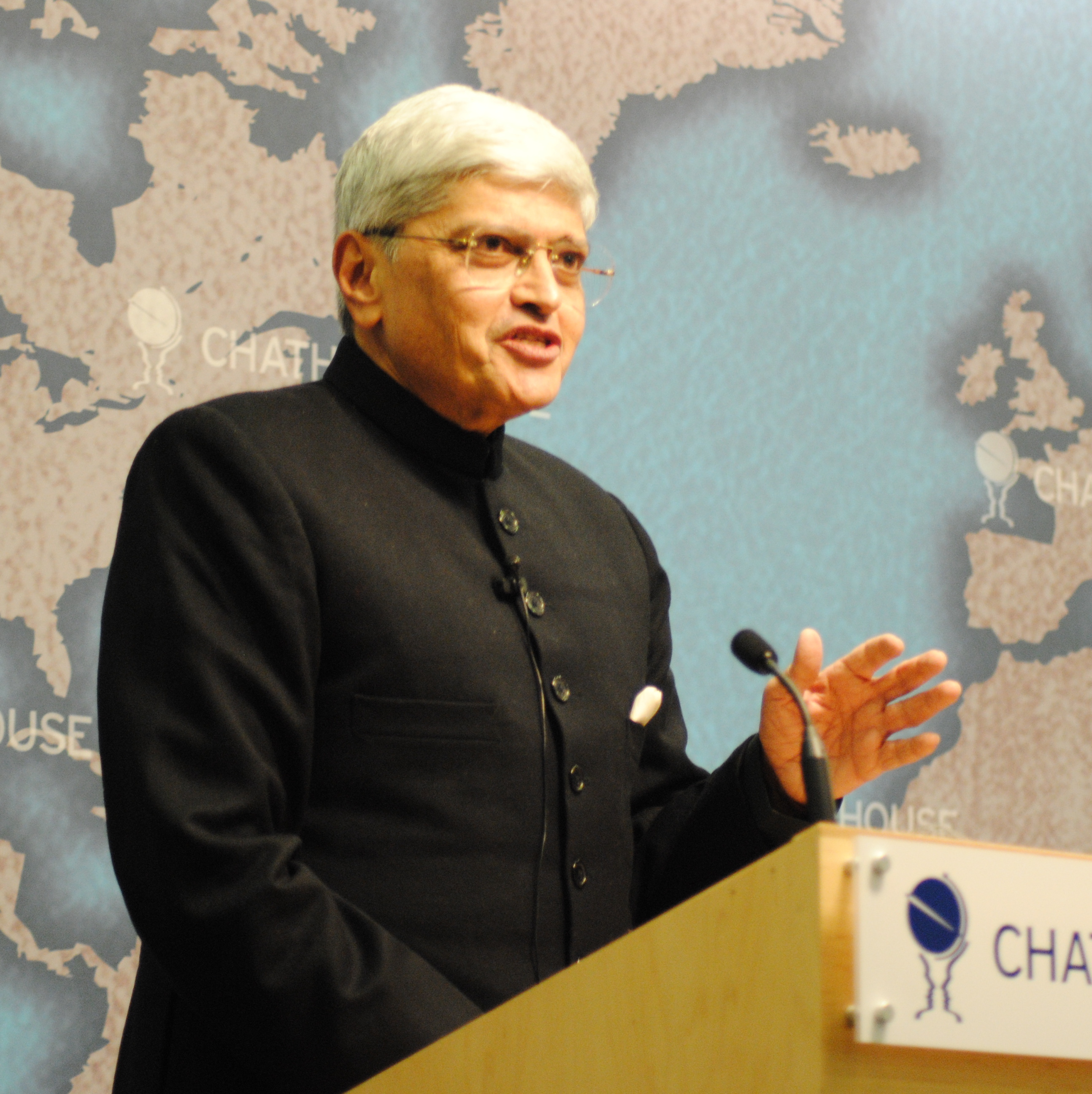
Gopalkrishna Gandhi

- Pulapre Balakrishnan – economist
- Amita Baviskar – environmental sociologist
- Nayan Chanda – political scientist
- Ashwini Deshpande – economist
- Gopalkrishna Gandhi – politician; historian
- Sunil Khilnani – political scientist
- Nayanjot Lahiri – historian
- Srinath Raghavan – historian
- Upinder Singh – historian
- Aparna Vaidik – historian
- Ali Khan Mahmudabad - political scientist; historian

=== Science ===
- Anurag Agrawal – medical scientist, pulmonologist
- Rajendra Bhatia – mathematician
- Alok Bhattacharya – parasitologist
- Sudha Bhattacharya – parasitologist
- Sourav Pal – theoretical chemist
- Somak Raychaudhury - astrophysicist
- L. S. Shashidhara – developmental biologist, geneticist
- Dipyaman Ganguly – immunologist

== Controversies ==
In October 2016, a faculty member, Rajendran Narayanan, and two other employees resigned; it was alleged by the Faculty Council that they were asked to resign because they signed a petition on Kashmir, something the university denies. Narayanan believes he was targeted because he was also organising a Workers' Welfare Committee for all campus staff.

In March 2021, two faculty members, Pratap Bhanu Mehta (formerly the VC of the university) and Arvind Subramanian, resigned within days of each other, alleging a curbing of academic freedom in the university. Mehta has been an open advocate of liberalism, speaking openly about the 'Death of liberalism' under the Narendra Modi Government. He resigned from Ashoka University in March 2021, when trustees Pramath Raj Sinha and Ashish Dhawan are said to have told him that his "intellectual interventions were something they could no longer protect." This was followed by protests from students and faculty, who alleged that Mehta's views on the Modi administration might have drawn pressure internally, leading him to resign, but the Vice Chancellor denied that.

=== Sabyasachi Das paper controversy (2023) ===
In August 2023, Assistant Professor Sabyasachi Das of the university's Economics Department resigned following the university's decision to formally announce that it was distancing itself from a controversial paper by Das, wherein he documents evidence consistent with electoral manipulation by the incumbent Bharatiya Janata Party during India's 2019 general election. His resignation was accepted after making extensive efforts to dissuade him.

Ashoka University's Vice Chancellor, Somak Raychaudhury, was cited by The Times of India stating that the research by Professor Das was perceived as reflecting the university's official stance. Raychaudhury clarified that the paper had not undergone a complete critical review process and had not been published in any accredited academic journal. As reported by The Free Press Journal, the VC elucidated that Ashoka University grants its faculty members the autonomy to engage in teaching and research within their fields of interest. It was pointed out that while the university does not directly oversee or moderate the research pursuits of its faculty and students, this ethos of academic freedom was extended to Professor Das as well. The Vice Chancellor underscored that Ashoka University's rise in less than a decade is attributed to its unwavering dedication to both research and pedagogical excellence.

Following his resignation, his colleague in the Economics Department, Professor Pulapre Balakrishnan, also resigned. The Economics Department and the Political Science Department came out with formal statements expressing their support for Das. These departments demanded that Das be reinstated.

The Departments of English and Creative Writing called for Das' reinstatement. The Department of Sociology and Anthropology also expressed solidarity with Das.

== See also ==
- List of universities in India
- List of institutions of higher education in Haryana
- List of private universities in India
