= Pulapre Balakrishnan =

Indian economist and educationalist

- Born: 4 April 1955 (age 71); India
- Occupation: Economist

Academic background
- Education: (B.A) Madras Christian College; University of Madras (1975) (M.A.) Jawaharlal Nehru University (1977) (M. Phil.), University of Oxford (1981) (Ph.D) University of Cambridge (1988)

Academic work
- Institutions: University of Oxford; Indian Statistical Institute, New Delhi; IIM Kozhikode; Centre for Development Studies Ashoka University

Pulapre Balakrishnan (Malayalam: പുലപ്രെ ബാലകൃഷ്ണൻ) is an Indian economist and educationalist. He has served as the director of Centre for Development Studies and Professor at Indian Institute of Management Kozhikode.

== Early life and education ==
Pulapre Balakrishnan was born in his ancestral village of Klari, Malappuram, Kerala on 4 April 1955. He was educated in schools of Moscow and completed his B.A from University of Madras and his M.A from Jawaharlal Nehru University, his Master of Philosophy from Oxford University and his PhD from Cambridge University.

== Academic work ==
Pulapre has written in the professional journals and is the author of the books ‘Pricing and Inflation in India’ (OUP India, 1991), ‘Economic Growth in India: History and Prospect’ (OUP India, 2010) and 'Politics Trumps Economics' along with Bimal Jalan. Balakrishnan has held appointments at Worcester College Oxford, the Indian Statistical Institute at Delhi, the Indian Institute of Management at Kozhikode, and Ashoka University in Haryana. He has served as Country Economist for Ukraine at the World Bank and been consultant to the International Labour Organisation, the Reserve Bank of India and the United Nations Development Program. He has for over two decades intervened in the public debate on India's economy via his popular writings. He is the recipient of the Malcolm Adiseshiah Award for Distinguished Contribution to Development Studies (2014).
