= Ashwini Deshpande =

Indian economist

- Citizenship: Indian
- Education: Bachelors at University of Delhi; Masters at Delhi School of Economics; Ph.D at Delhi School of Economics
- Occupations: Economist, professor, author
- Employer: Ashoka University

Ashwini Deshpande is an Indian economist best known for her papers concerning various topics such as poverty, inequality, regional disparities, and gender discrimination. She is currently working as a professor at Ashoka University; she has taught at the Delhi School of Economics in the past as well. She has won many awards for her papers and publications, one of which is called Grammar of Caste: Economic Discrimination in Contemporary India.

== Education and work ==
Ashwini Deshpande completed her bachelor's honors in Economics in 1985 from the University of Delhi. She then proceeded to complete her masters at the Delhi School of Economics in 1987. Additionally, in 1994 she earned her Ph.D. at the Delhi School of Economics with Some Aspects of the International Debt Crisis of Developing Countries. After graduating she was a lecturer at different colleges and universities in the Delhi area. From 1998-2000 Ashwini Deshpande Post-doctoral research fellow, University of North Carolina, Chapel Hill, USA.

She also has a lot of major research and organisational experience, which includes being a chairperson at the annual conference for development and change from 2005-2007 and 2010. In 2007 she was one of four people appointed to be the principal investigators in a project on Urban Labour Market Inequality in India, which was initiated by Princeton University, USA and Indian Institute of Dalit Studies. She was also an author in a DFID funded study "Gender-caste growth assessment" designed to bring out the interconnections between growth and gender/caste inequalities in India. Additionally she was a regional author for the 2010 UN Report written by Naila Kabeer about inequality and if the MDG would be able to diminish the inequalities which many face. She was also appointed to some official positions including being a member of the Ministry of Minority Affairs in 2007, the consultative group of external sector in 2004, and in planning commission all for the Government of India. She has also done some work internationally, she was the deputy director of the Cambridge Advanced Program on Development Economics in 2002. She also served as a Social Sciences Jury Member for the Infosys Prize 2020.

== Works ==
Ashwini Deshpande has written several works, including books, journal articles, and papers. The overall theme of her work is the effects of Indian culture on its own society. She has also written some articles about music.

=== Books ===
Ashwini Deshpande has currently published several books of her own, including The Grammar of Caste: Economic Discrimination in Contemporary India, published in 2011, Globalization and Development: A Handbook of New Perspectives, published in 2010, and The Global Economic Crisis and the Developing World.

The Grammar of Caste: Economic Discrimination in Contemporary India is about the discrimination there is within Indian society because of the caste system in India and how it has changed in recent years. Data from the Indian Railways for 23 years was examined. Research from various other writers suggests that there are patterns in the labour market which show that in many jobs people are discriminated against just because of their caste.

Globalization and Development: A Handbook of New Perspectives is a book written about the alternatives of globalization. Taking specific countries as case studies, the book explores alternative policies which could be implemented outside of the mainstream discourse. In the book, decomposition method was used to measure the discrimination people face because of the caste system, and she discusses the advantages and disadvantages of using this methodology as well.

The Global Economic Crisis and the Developing World is a book about how wealth inequality can be effected by an economic crisis. In addition, it analyzes how unemployment is affected in a country due to a financial crisis by comparing separate countries unemployment and inequality levels. In the book, the main countries which are discussed are South Africa and Brazil. There was a correlation between inequality and unemployment with a coefficient of 80% based on data from 2001, 2002, and 2007. But, South Africa was a bit of an outlier as the data from the middle-class did not have a correlation with unemployment compared to the other classes and Brazil. The results showed that for a country to face the least amount of loss during a crisis, policies to maximize employment should be implemented.

== Awards and grants ==
Year	Grant/Award	Reason
1989	University Grant Commission	Grant for research
1989	Junior Research Fellowship	Grant for Research
1994	EXIM Bank Awards	outstanding dissertation in the area of international trade and related issues
2007	V.K.R.V. Rao Award	Economist under 45 for original and significant contribution to Indian economics
2012-2017	Grant from European Commission	For India's participation in "Enhancing Knowledge for Renewed Knowledge against Poverty"
2016	Grant from Economic and Social Research Council	Research for Choice constraint and the gender dynamics of labour markets in West Bengal"
2019	Grant from EU-India Platform for the Social Sciences and Humanities	For "Challenging Inequalities: A Indo-European perspective"
2019	Grant from Wellcome Trust, UK	For "Economic and Social Dimensions of Health and Morbidity"
