= Pramath Raj Sinha =

Indian academic and entrepreneur

Pramath Raj Sinha is an entrepreneur, academic administrator, executive, and philanthropist. He is the founder & chairman of the board of trustees of Ashoka University, a premier liberal arts and sciences university pioneering interdisciplinary education and research in India. He is a founding senior partner of Jetri, India's only education-focused strategy and implementation firm. He was also the founding dean and is a member of the executive board of Indian School of Business (ISB), a top-ranked business school.

Dr. Sinha has been instrumental in setting up a wide spectrum of change-based higher education initiatives, including a first-of-its-kind postgraduate management program for women, an entrepreneurship fellowship for the Himalayan region, and a solution-focused design university for the built environment. He was also the founder and chairperson of Harappa (now part of upGrad), along with Vedica Scholars Programme for Women, and Naropa Fellowship. He has been a media entrepreneur, education consultant and management advisor at the 9.9 Group Private Limited, which he founded, and a Partner at McKinsey & Company.

== Early life and education ==
Sinha grew up in Patna with three older sisters and completed his schooling from St. Michael's High School, Patna, Bihar. His father and grandfather were both writers and his father owned a textbook-publishing business.

He received a PhD and an MSE from the University of Pennsylvania, and a BTech from the Indian Institute of Technology (IIT), Kanpur, where he was honoured with the Distinguished Alumnus Award in 2018.

Pramath is fluent in English, Hindi and Bhojpuri.

== Career ==
=== McKinsey & Company ===
After completing his PhD, Sinha worked in McKinsey & Company for 12 years and was a partner in the firm. He joined the firm's North America Practice as a consultant in 1993 and subsequently started working with the India Practice in 1995. Sinha moved to India in 1997 and helped build the India Practice.

In his 12 years at the firm, he worked with both public and private sector clients, including working with the Malaysian government to make the country a knowledge hub. He led McKinsey India's telecom, IT, and media practice. He also focused on issues around organisation transformation and leadership.

=== Post McKinsey & Company ===
In 2006, Sinha joined Ananda Bazar Patrika (ABP) as the group's MD & CEO. ABP owned properties such as Ananda Bazar Patrika, The Telegraph, STAR News, as well as Penguin Books India. In 2007, Sinha left the ABP Group to launch his own company 9.9 Media (renamed as 9.9 Group). Sinha continues to serve as the managing director of 9.9 Group. 9.9 Group is the strategic partner of Albright Stonebridge Group (ASG) in India, a commercial diplomacy firm chaired by former US Secretary of State Madeleine Albright and former US Secretary of Commerce Carlos Guiterrez. Sinha serves as the Senior Counselor responsible for the South Asia practice at ASG.

=== Building educational institutions ===
While at McKinsey & Company, Sinha was given the charge to build an international-quality business school in India. In 2001, Indian School of Business (ISB) was formally established and has since become a global leader in management education. Sinha took a year off from McKinsey & Company to serve as the Founding Dean of ISB from June 2001 to June 2002.

Around 2007, Sinha was approached by Ashish Dhawan and Sanjeev Bikhchandani to build a world-class liberal arts college in India. Around the same time, a group of Indian Institute of Technology Delhi graduates contacted Sinha to build an engineering college in the country. Sinha merged these two groups to create the vision of Ashoka University. Sinha currently serves as a founder and trustee at Ashoka University.

Sinha also co-founded Vedica Scholars Programme for Women along with Anuradha Das Mathur, a unique alternative to traditional MBA courses. The programme aims to address the problem that far more women graduate from high school than men, but get left behind in careers. The curriculum offers subjects such as politics, sociology, and history, that are neglected by conventional MBAs.

Sinha has also been instrumental in building India's first design university Anant National University. Sinha served as the Founding Provost of Anant National University. In 2018, Sinha co-founded Naropa Fellowship, with the vision to remove barriers in the education system in the Himalayan region.

Sinha is associated with, and currently sits on the Board of various institutions such as Nigerian University of Technology and Management, JK Lakshmipat University, National Rail and Transportation Institute (NRTI), Delhi Skill and Entrepreneurship University. He also serves as an advisor to Indian School of Development and Management, Central Square Foundation, Population Foundation of India.

=== Venturing into online education ===
Drawing from his learnings through building successful educational institutions, Sinha went onto to start Harappa (now part of upGrad), an online-first learning institution on building habits and skills critical to workplace success in the twenty-first century.

== Awards & publications ==
He is an author of two books: An Idea Whose Time Has Come: The Story Of The Indian School Of Business (2011), and Learn, Don’t Study (2023).

In 2013, Sinha was listed by Thinkers50 as one of India's 'top 50 management thinkers' and in 2015 he was named as the 'Personality of the Year' by FICCI (Federation of Indian Chambers of Commerce and Industry) for his contribution to education.

In 2018, IIT Kanpur conferred on him the Distinguished Alumnus Award for his service to society.
