= Shahid Jameel =

Indian virologist and academic (born 1957)

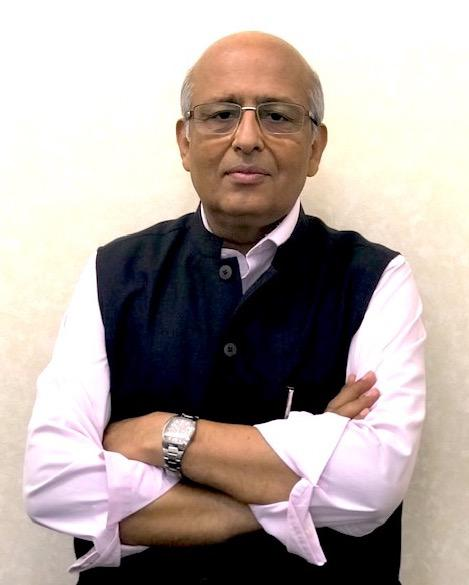
- Dr. Shahid Jameel
- Born: 8 August 1957 (age 69); Aligarh, Uttar Pradesh, India
- Education: Aligarh Muslim University (BSc); IIT Kanpur (MSc); Washington State University (PhD)
- Known for: Studies on hepatitis E virus
- Spouse: Rizwana Jameel
- Children: 2
- Awards: Shanti Swarup Bhatnagar Prize (2000)
- Scientific career
- Fields: Virology
- Workplaces: University of Colorado Health Sciences Center; International Centre for Genetic Engineering and Biotechnology; Wellcome Trust DBT India Alliance; University of Oxford
- Doctoral advisor: A. Siddiqui; B. A. McFadden

Shahid Jameel (born 8 August 1957) is an Indian virologist and academic. Dr. Jameel is the Sultan Qaboos bin Said Fellow at Oxford Centre for Islamic Studies and Research Fellow, Green Templeton College, University of Oxford. He serves as the Principal Investigator for the Centre's project on Public Health, Science and Technology in Muslim societies. Previously he was the director of the Trivedi School of Biosciences since its inception in the year 2020 at Ashoka University. He was formerly head of the scientific advisory group to the Indian SARS-CoV-2 Genomics Consortia (INSACOG) established in December 2020, and the chief executive officer of Wellcome Trust DBT India Alliance. Known for his research in hepatitis E virus, Jameel is an elected fellow of all the three major Indian science academies viz. National Academy of Sciences, India, Indian Academy of Sciences, and Indian National Science Academy. The Council of Scientific and Industrial Research, the apex agency of the Government of India for scientific research, awarded him the Shanti Swarup Bhatnagar Prize for Science and Technology, one of the highest Indian science awards for his contributions to Medical Sciences in 2000. (Note: Long link - please select award year to see details)

== Biography ==
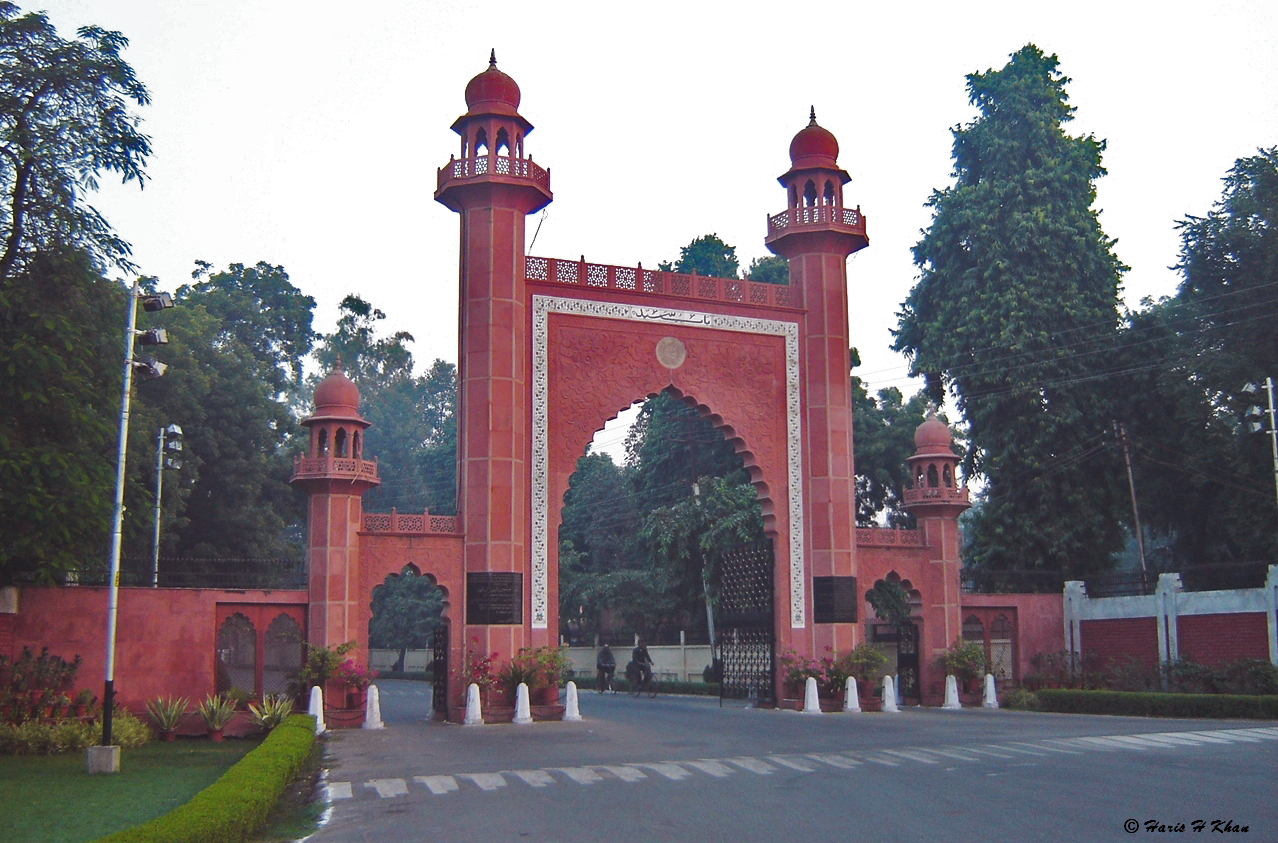
Entrance to Aligarh Muslim University

Shahid Jameel was born on 8 August 1957 in the Indian state of Uttar Pradesh to Abdul Majid Siddiqui, a medical academic, and his wife Jameela Aleem. His maternal grandfather was Dr. Abdul Aleem. He obtained a Bachelor of Science degree from Aligarh Muslim University in 1977 and an Master of Science degree in chemistry from the Indian Institute of Technology Kanpur in 1979. (Note: Long link – please select J and click on Shahid Jameel to see details) Jameel did his doctoral studies at Washington State University where he received his Doctor of Philosophy degree in biochemistry in 1984. Jameel performed his postdoctoral work on molecular virology at the Department of Microbiology and Immunology of University of Colorado Health Sciences Center. Three years later, he joined the institute as an assistant professor at the division of rheumatology. His stay there lasted a year and on his return to India in 1988, he joined International Centre for Genetic Engineering and Biotechnology (ICGEB) where he established the Virology Research Group. He continued his research at ICGEB as a senior scientist and the head of the virology research group for around 25 years. In 2013, he moved to Wellcome Trust DBT India Alliance as its chief executive officer and holds the position. He was short listed as one of the five choices for the post of the vice chancellor of Aligarh Muslim University in January 2017 and remained in contention when the list was later shortened to three by AMU Court.

== Legacy ==
Jameel's research on virology started with his work on hepatitis B virus during his stay at the laboratory of A. Siddiqui at University of Colorado Health Sciences Center from 1984 to 1987 where he also worked on gene expression of interleukin-1 family of cytokines. Later, he is known to have carried out studies on the molecular biology of hepatitis E virus (HEV) and human immunodeficiency virus (HIV) and he is credited with identifying molecular characterisation and transmission routes of these viruses. He elucidated the structure of the viruses as well as their functions which are reported to be useful in developing diagnostic and prophylactic protocols. His group identified that HIV-1 subtype C is the most prevalent form of infection in India and he continues his work focusing on HIV accessory proteins, HIV co-receptor dynamics, hepatitis B, X and SARS virus 3a proteins. He headed the group which worked on the development of vaccines for HIV-1 subtype C, a project funded jointly by ICGEB and National Institutes of Health. His research has been documented and cited in texts and articles (Note: Please see Selected bibliography section) and he has contributed chapters to books published by others. Besides, he has also published three books, Isocitrate Lyase and Proteinases from Fat-rich Seedlings, Current Developments in Animal Virology: Papers Presented at the First ICGEB-UCI Virology Symposium, New Delhi, February 1995 and Advances in Animal Virology: Papers Presented at the Second ICGEB-UCI Virology Symposium, New Delhi, November 1998 and has mentored a number of doctoral, post-doctoral and master's scholars.

Jameel sits in the Court of the Aligarh Muslim University, having nominated to the governing body of the university in August 2016. He has served as the editor of medical section of VirusDisease journal of Springer (erstwhile Indian Journal of Virology) and is a former member of the editorial boards of Journal of Biotechnology and Biomedicine, Journal of Biosciences and Proceedings of the Indian National Science Academy (PINSA). He has delivered keynote addresses or invited speeches which included the Sir Syed Day Celebration 2016 in Chicago and is a designated speaker at the National Conference on Biotechnology and Environment (NCOBE-2017) to be held at Jamia Millia Islamia in August 2017.

== Awards and honors ==
Jameel received the BM Birla Science Prize in Biology of B. M. Birla Science Centre in 1995. The National Academy of Sciences, India elected him as a fellow in 1996 and the Indian Academy of Sciences followed suit a year later. The Council of Scientific and Industrial Research awarded him Shanti Swarup Bhatnagar Prize, one of the highest Indian science awards in 2000 and he became a fellow of the Indian National Science Academy in 2004. He is a member of Guha Research Conference as well as the American Society for Microbiology and the award orations delivered by him include the Dr. M. R. Das Memorial Lecture of the Indian National Science Academy.

== Selected bibliography ==
=== Books ===
- Shahid Jameel (1984). Isocitrate Lyase and Proteinases from Fat-rich Seedlings. Washington State University.
- Shahid Jameel; Edward K. Wagner (1996). Current Developments in Animal Virology: Papers Presented at the First ICGEB-UCI Virology Symposium, New Delhi, February 1995. Science Publishers. ISBN 978-1-886106-61-1.
- Dr. Shahid Jameel; Luis Villareal (1 January 2000). Advances in Animal Virology: Papers Presented at the Second ICGEB-UCI Virology Symposium, New Delhi, November 1998. Science Publishers. ISBN 978-1-57808-094-6.

=== Chapters ===
- R. Holland Cheng; Tatsuo Miyamura (2008). Structure-based Study of Viral Replication: With CD-ROM. World Scientific. pp. 13–. ISBN 978-981-279-085-9.
- Richard L. Guerrant; David H. Walker; Peter F. Weller (5 April 2011). Tropical Infectious Diseases: Principles, Pathogens and Practice. Elsevier Health Sciences. pp. 59–. ISBN 978-1-4377-3777-6.

=== Articles ===
- Panteva M, Korkaya H, Jameel S (2003). "Hepatitis viruses and the MAPK pathway: is this a survival strategy?". Virus Res. 92 (2): 131–40. doi:10.1016/s0168-1702(02)00356-8. PMID 12686421.
- Sehgal D, Thomas S, Chakraborty M, Jameel S (2006). "Expression and processing of the Hepatitis E virus ORF1 nonstructural polyprotein". Virol. J. 3 (38) 38. doi:10.1186/1743-422X-3-38. PMC 1481634. PMID 16725054.
- Chandra V, Taneja S, Kalia M, Jameel S (2008). "Molecular biology and pathogenesis of hepatitis E virus". J. Biosci. 33 (4): 451–64. doi:10.1007/s12038-008-0064-1. PMID 19208971. S2CID 25522943.
- Imran Ahmad, R. Prasida Holla, Shahid Jameel (2011). "Molecular Virology of Hepatitis E Virus". Virus Res. 161 (1): 47–58. doi:10.1016/j.virusres.2011.02.011. PMC 3130092. PMID 21345356.
- Holla P, Ahmad I, Ahmed Z, Jameel S (2015). "Hepatitis E virus enters liver cells through a dynamin-2, clathrin and membrane cholesterol-dependent pathway". Traffic. 16 (4): 398–416. doi:10.1111/tra.12260. PMID 25615268.

== See also ==
- Subtypes of HIV
