= Ved Pratap Vaidik =

Indian writer (1944–2023)

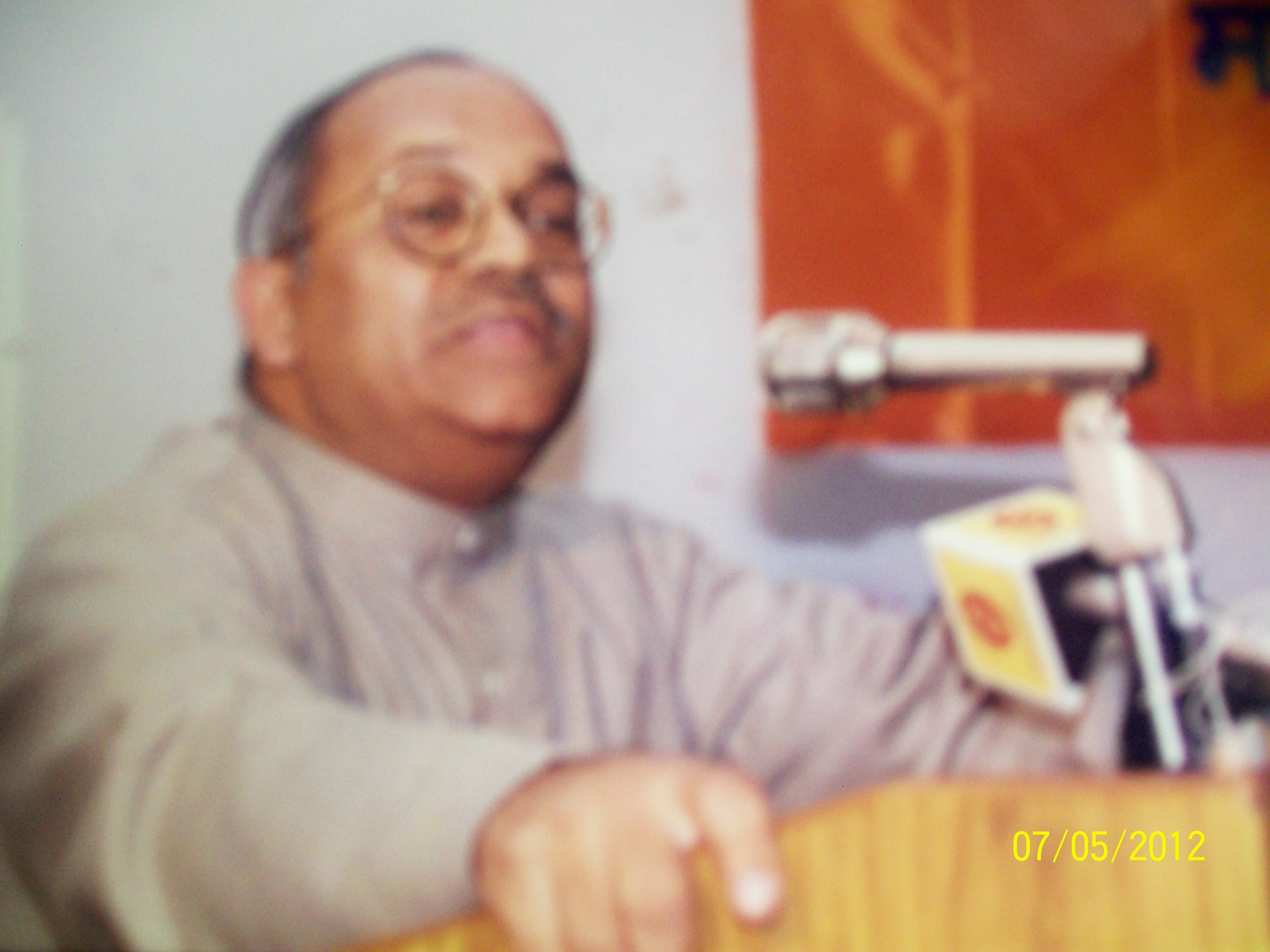
- Vaidik speaking at a function
- Born: 30 December 1944; Indore, Central India Agency, British Raj
- Died: 14 March 2023 (aged 78); Gurugram, Haryana, India
- Education: M.A., Ph.D.
- Alma mater: Jawaharlal Nehru University
- Occupations: Journalist, political analyst
- Spouse: Dr. Vedwati Vaidik
- Children: One son and one daughter
- Writing career
- Period: From 1971 till 2023
- Genre: Prose
- Subject: International politics
- Notable works: Ethnic Crisis in Sri Lanka : India’s Options Soviet-American Rivalry in Afghanistan                 Hindi Journalism : Various Dimensions                 Indian Foreign Policy : New Pointers                 Bhartiya Bhashayen Lao : Kyon Aur Kaise?                 Hindi Ka Sampurna Samachar Patra Kaisa Ho?                 Vartmaan Bharat, Afghanistan : Kal Aaj aur Kal and Mahashakti Bharat.
- Notable awards: Ramdhari Singh Dinkar award, Hindi Academy Delhi award, Ram Manohar Lohia award.
- Movement: Satyagraha for implementation of Hindi

Ved Pratap Vaidik (/ˈvɛdɪk/ VED-ik) (Hindi: वेद प्रताप वैदिक; 30 December 1944 – 14 March 2023) was an Indian journalist, political analyst, and freelance columnist. He worked with the Press Trust of India, and was the founder and editor of its Hindi news agency "Bhasha". Before that he was the editor for views for the Navbharat Times of the Times Group. Later he was the chairman of Bhartiya Bhasha Sammelan. He was born in Indore on 30 December 1944, and died in Gurugram, Haryana on 14 March 2023, at age 78.

== Published work ==
Vaidik published several award-winning research publications. His published books include:

- Soviet-American Rivalry in Afghanistan
- Hindi Journalism : Various Dimensions
- Indian Foreign Policy : New Pointers
- Bhartiya Bhashayen Lao : Kyon Aur Kaise?
- Hindi ka Sampurna Samachar Patra Kaisa ho?
- Vartmaan Bharat
- Afghanistan : Kal, Aaj aur Kal
- Mahshakti Bharat
- Ethnic Crisis in Sri Lanka : India's Options

In English:

- Meri Jati Hindustani (Diamond Books)
- swabhasha Lao: Angreji Hatwo (Prabhat Prakashan)
- Hindi Kaisa Bane vishwabhasha (Vani Prakashan)
- Modi ki Videshniti (Diamond Books)

== Awards ==
Some of the awards received by Vaidik are:

- Govind Vallabh Pant award 1976
- Purushottam Das Tandon award 1988
- Hindi Academy Delhi award for Journalism 1990
- Ram Manohar Lohia award Kanpur 1990
- Ramdhari Singh Dinkar award 1992
- Lala Lajpat Rai award 1992
- Vishwa Hindi Sammalan Samman, Surinam 2003
- Newsmakers Achievers Awards 2022

== Sources ==
- Agrawal Giriraj Sharan & Agrawal Meena HINDI SAHITYAKAR SANDARBH KOSH Volume II 2006 Hindi Sahitya Niketan Bijnor (U.P.) India, ISBN 81-85139-29-6
