= Siliguri College =

Govt. Sponsored Co-Education College, Darjeeling, West Bengal, India

- Other name: Siliguri City College
- Motto: आत्मदीपो भव
- Type: Undergraduate college Public college
- Established: 8 October 1950; 75 years ago
- Accreditation: NAAC accredited with grade B+ (Cycle 2)
- Affiliations: University of North Bengal
- Principal: Dr. Sujit Ghosh
- Location: Ward 17, Hakim Para, Siliguri, West Bengal, 734001, India; 26.7112702°N 88.4317823°E
- Campus: Urban
- Website: http://siliguricollege.org.in/
- Location within West Bengal Location within India

Siliguri College (also known as Siliguri City College), established on 8 October 1950, is the oldest college in Siliguri, in the Indian state of West Bengal. The college was earlier affiliated to the University of Calcutta till 1962 but later got changed to the University of North Bengal. It is now affiliated and accredited to University of North Bengal. The college offers Undergraduate courses in Arts and Sciences and also offers Postgraduate courses in Bengali and Geography. It offers admissions to students based on their merit in academics. Siliguri College also offers schemes like NSS and NCC for the benefit of students. The campus is located in Darjeeling district of West Bengal.

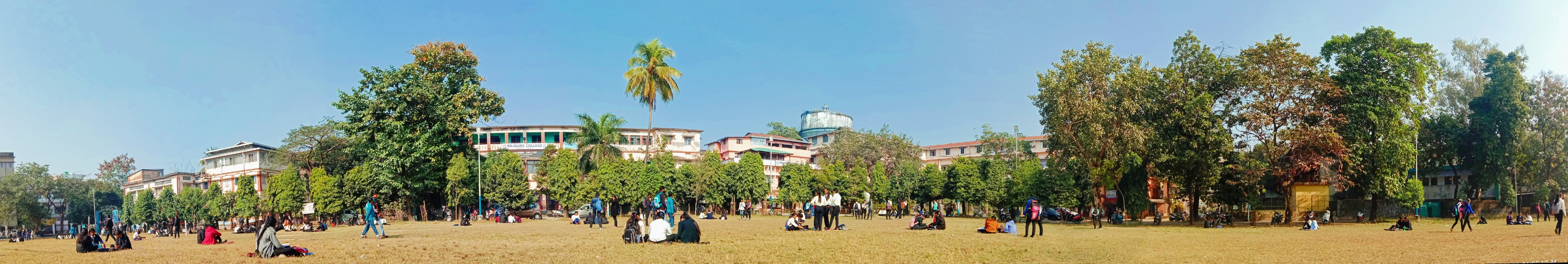
Siliguri college,1950

== History ==
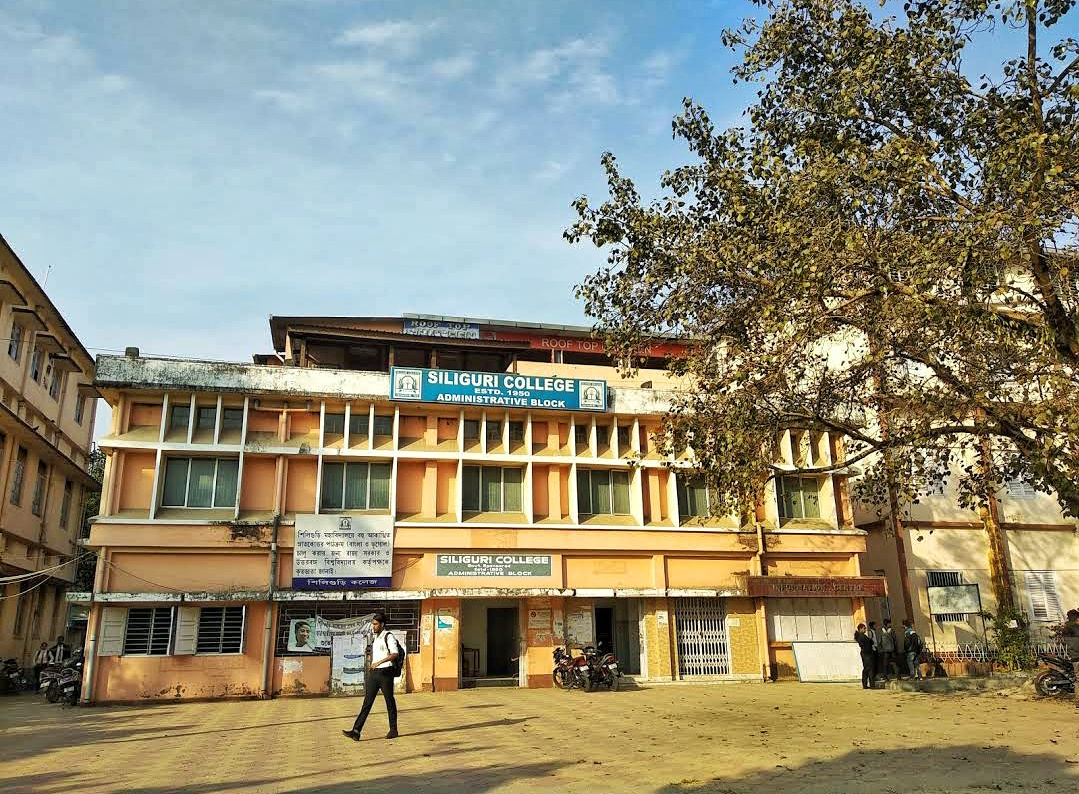
Siliguri College Administrative Block

Siliguri college was established on 8 October 1950 by Government of West Bengal under a dispersal scheme of the Refugee Relief and Rehabilitation Department with a view to imparting higher education to the refugee student population of the post-partition of Siliguri. Initially, after inception it was affiliated to Calcutta University. Later, in 1962, it transferred to the University of North Bengal.

== Programmes Offered ==
	Under Graduate Programmes (UG)	Post Graduate Programmes (PG)
Arts and Humanities	Arts and Humanities BA General, Sanskrit, Nepali, Bengali, Hindi, English, History, Education Economics (B.A.), Geography (B.A.), Political Science, Sociology, Philosophy, Mass communication & Journalism, Physical Education, Environment Studies	Bengali(M.A.), Geography (M.A.)
Sciences	Science B.Sc. General, Physics, Chemistry, Mathematics, Zoology, Botany, Statistics, Microbiology, Geography (B.Sc.), Economics (B.Sc.), Computer Science, Physiology, Bachelors of Computer Applications (BCA)]	Geography (M.Sc.)
Management	Bachelor's of Business Administration (BBA) Civil Aviation, Tour & Travel Management	

== Affiliation and Accreditation ==
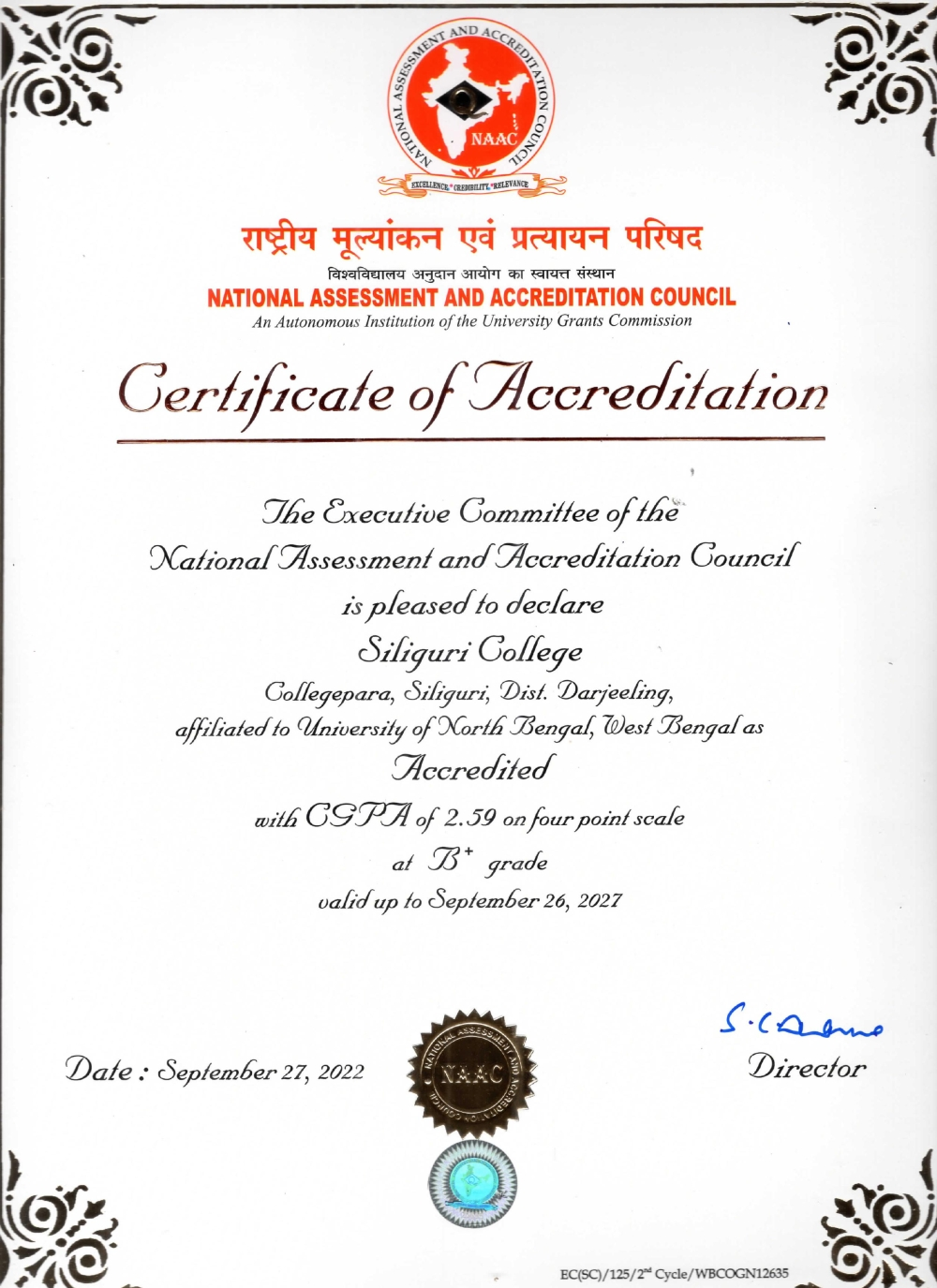
Siliguri College NAAC Certificate

The college is recognized by the University Grants Commission (UGC). It was accredited by the National Assessment and Accreditation Council (NAAC), and awarded B+ grade. The college was affiliated to University of Calcutta till 1962. Currently it is affiliated to University of North Bengal.

== Library ==
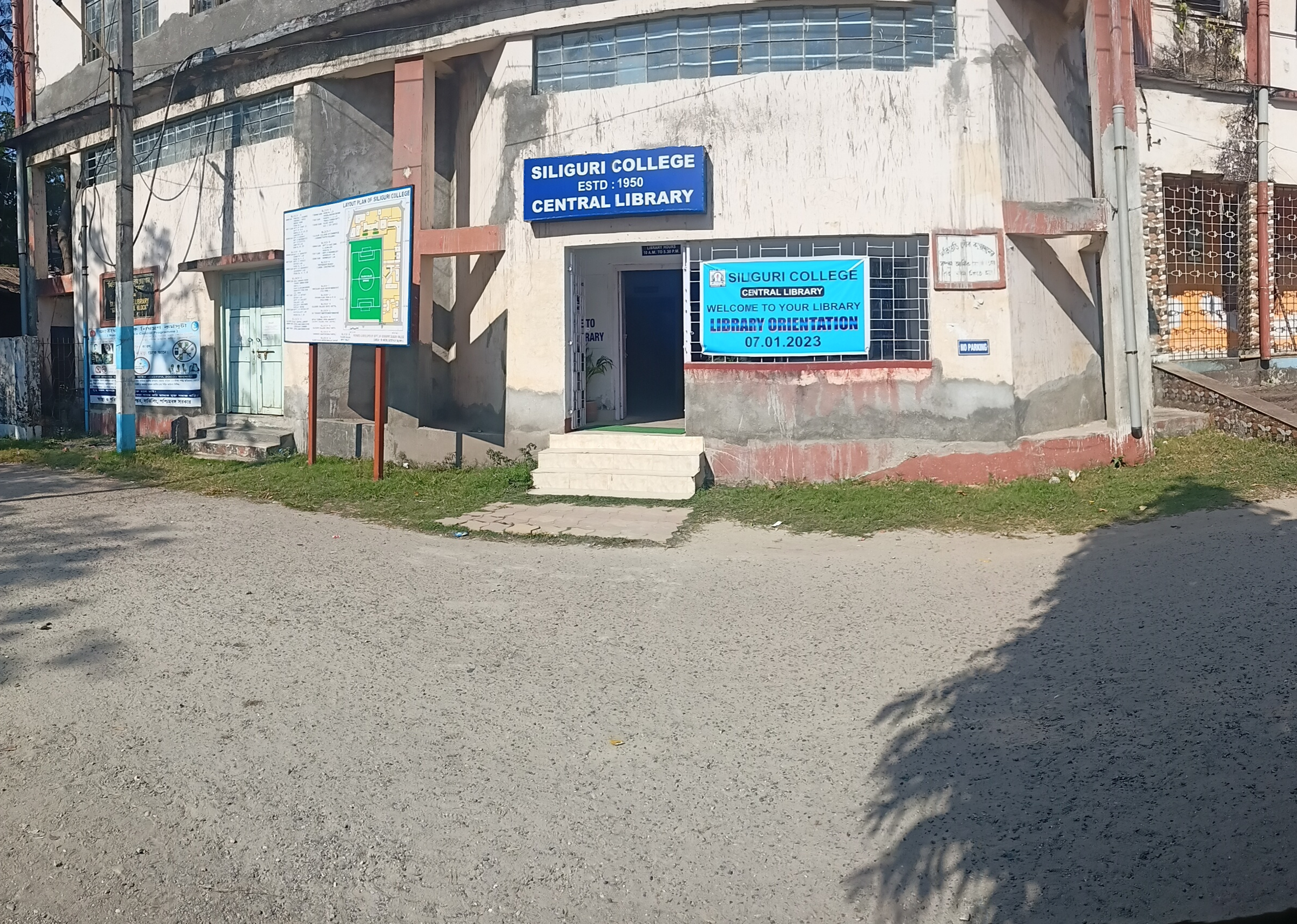
Siliguri college Central Library

The college has a library with a collection of text and reference books. Currently, it contains around 45151 regular and out of print volumes. 5 newspapers are available in the library and 10 printed journals are subscribed.

== Hostel ==
The college also contains two separate hostels for boys and girls. Boys hostel has a capacity of 63 students whereas newly build girls hostel can accommodate up to 48 students.

== Student politics and controversies ==
In May 2026, the college campus became a site of political tension following violent clashes between two rival student organizations, the Akhil Bharatiya Vidyarthi Parishad (ABVP) and the Trinamool Chhatra Parishad (TMCP). The altercation began on Monday, May 25, 2026, over a dispute regarding the setup of a student help desk for the ongoing college admission process.

Following the campus altercation, the ABVP submitted a formal memorandum to the Siliguri Police Station, alleging that its members had been attacked by TMCP activists and demanding stricter campus security alongside a legal probe into the incident. Concurrently, a TMCP student leader who sustained serious injuries during the physical altercation was hospitalized at the Siliguri District Hospital. Using campus CCTV footage to review the violence, the Siliguri Police subsequently arrested a TMCP leader linked to the clashes, who was then placed into five days of judicial custody by the court.

== Notable alumni ==
- Charu Majumdar, politician, founder of Naxalbari uprising.

== Gallery ==
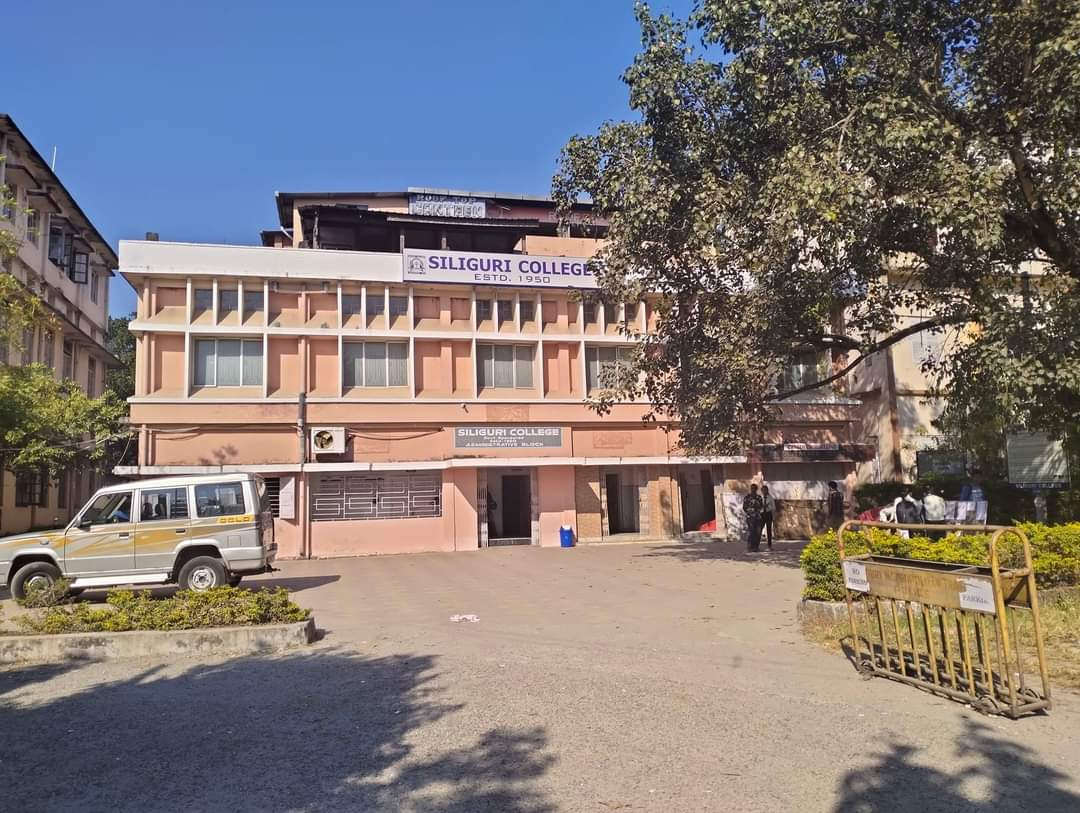
Siliguri college Administrative Block

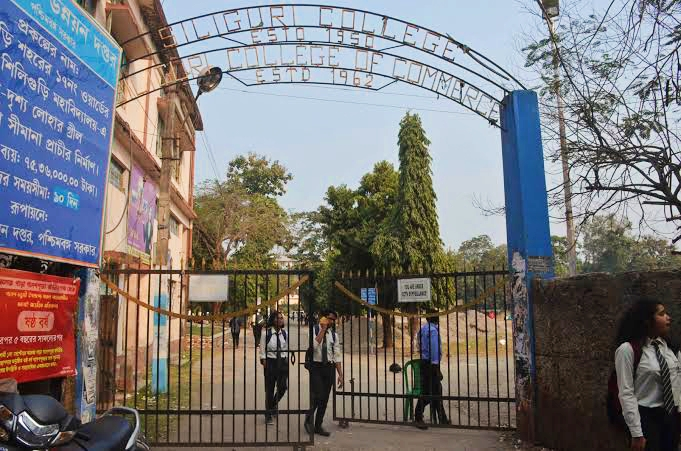
Siliguri College 1st Gate

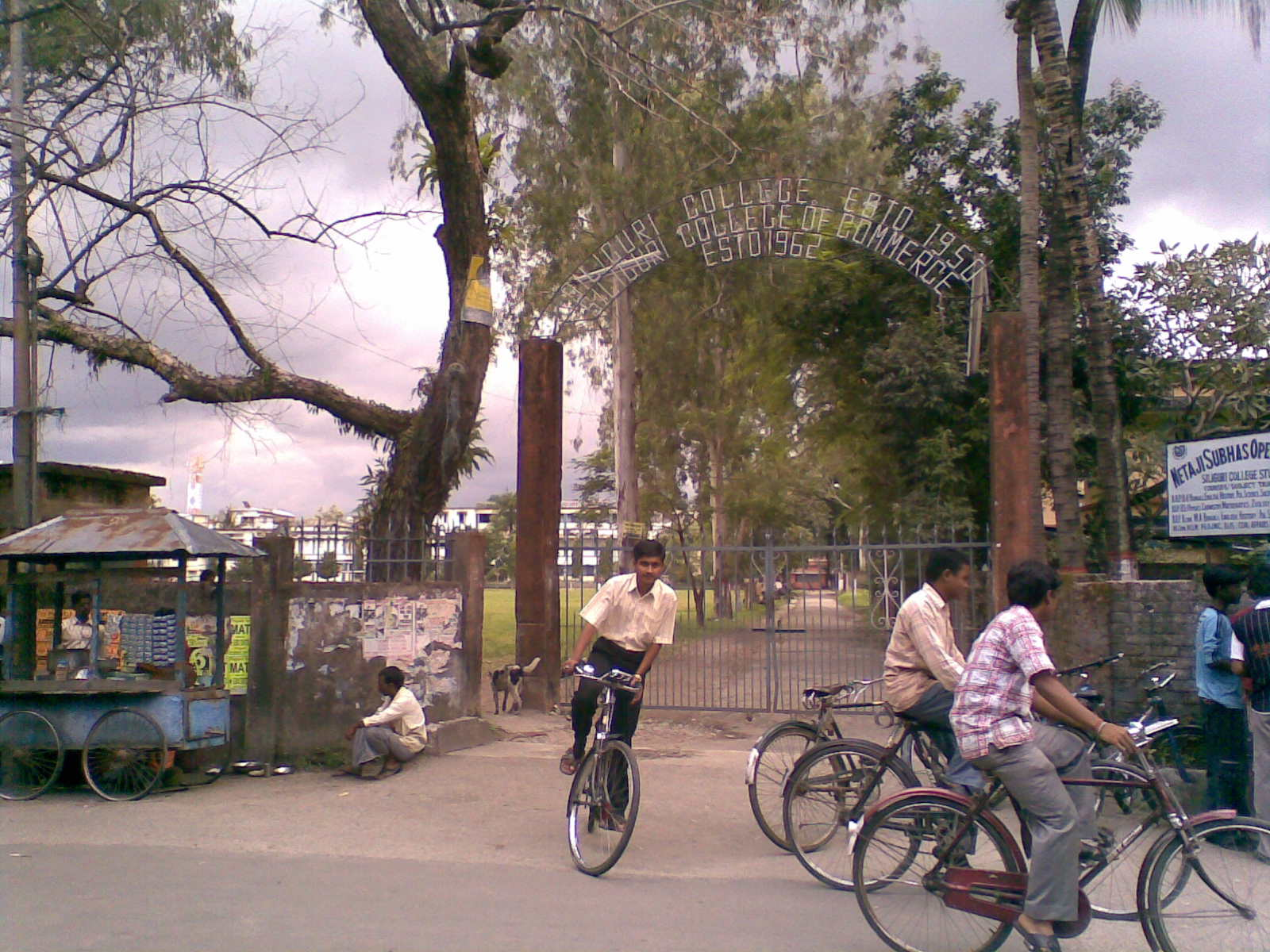
2nd Gate Of Siliguri college

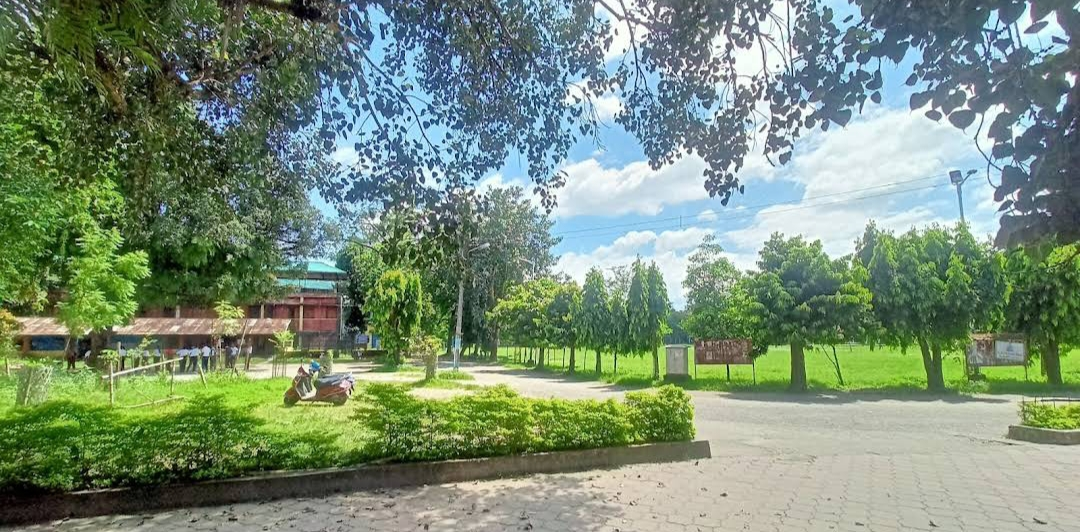
Siliguri college Campus

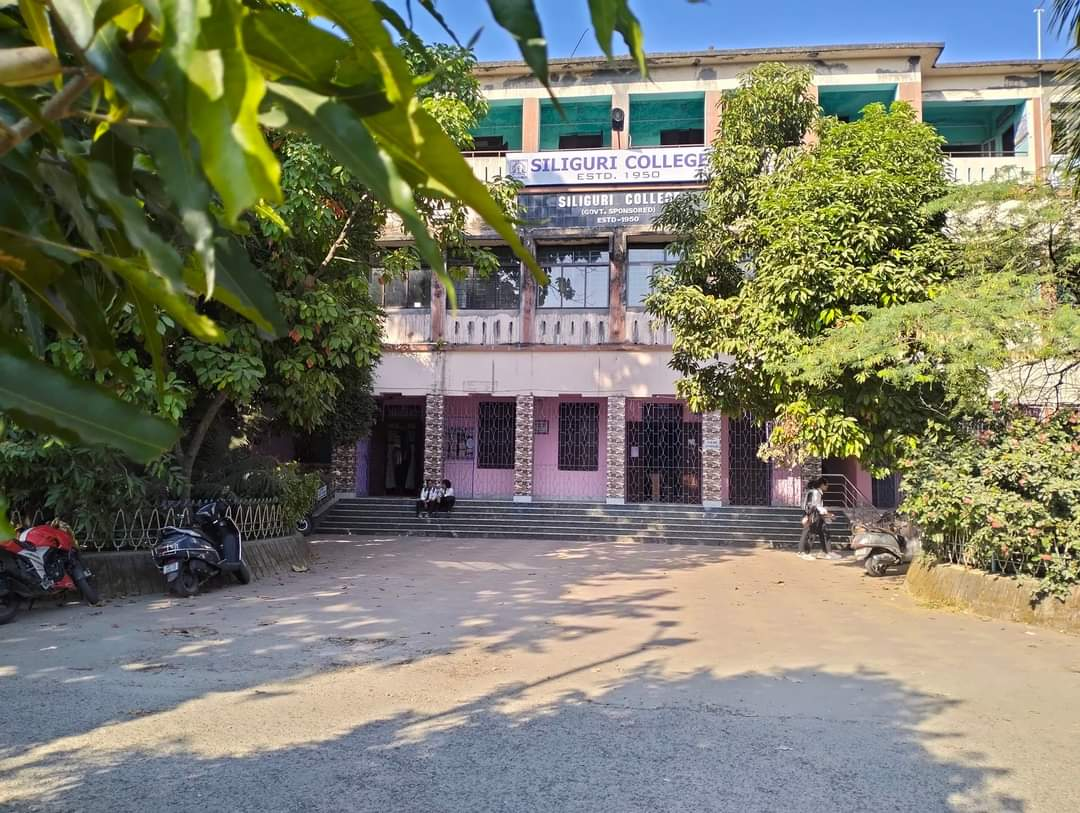
Siliguri College Block C

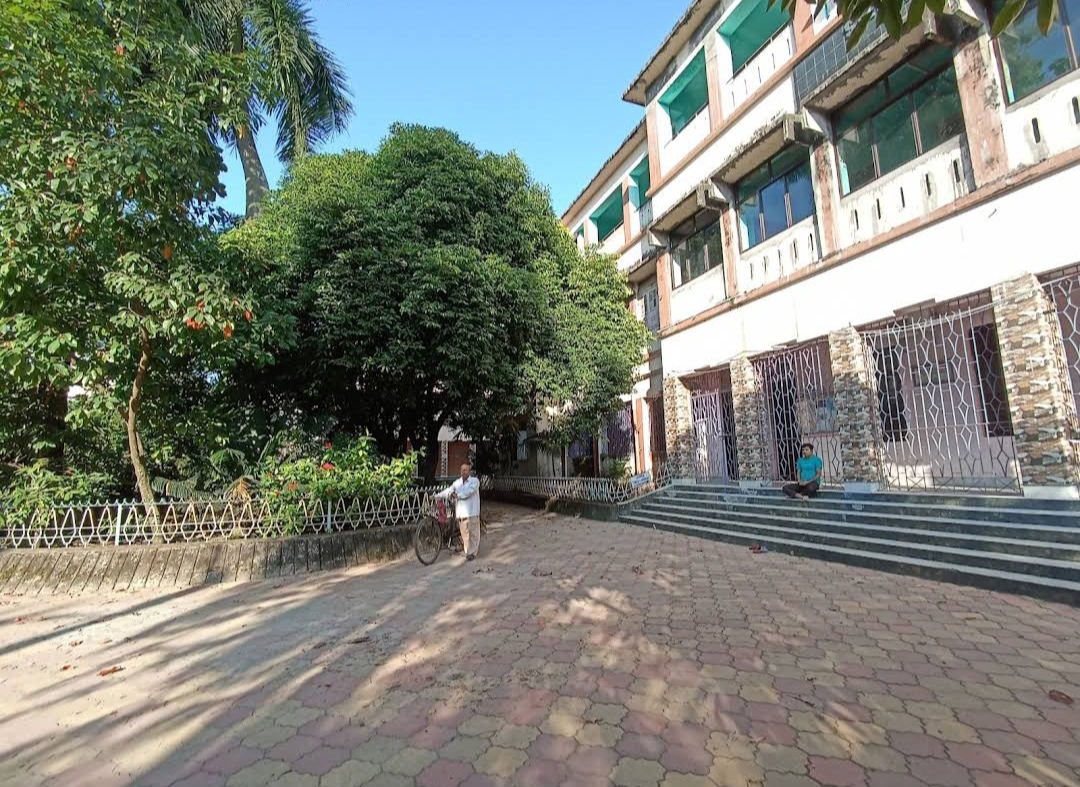
Siliguri College Block C

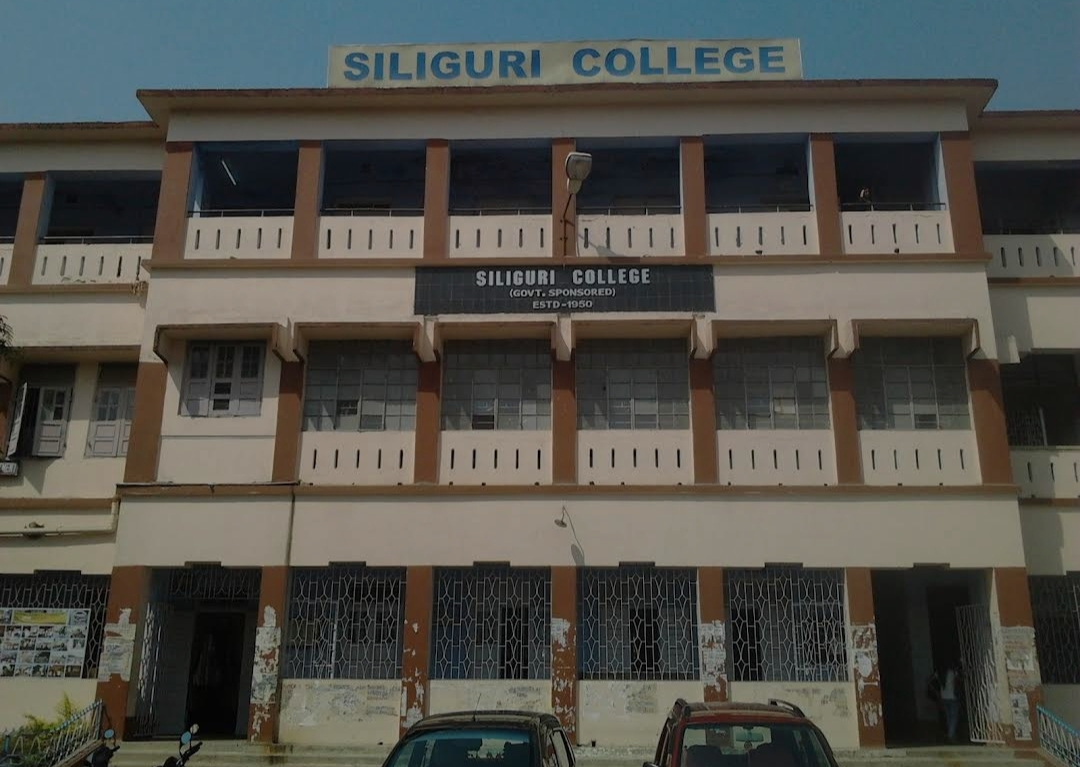
Siliguri College Building

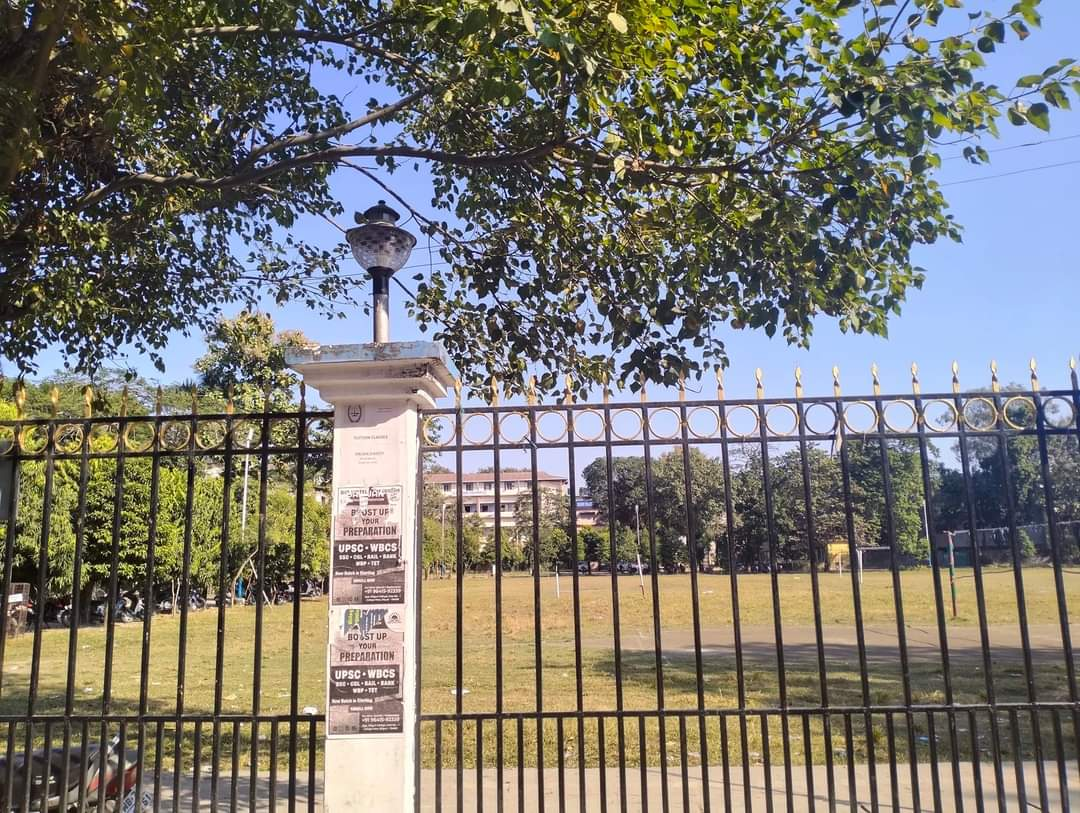
Siliguri College

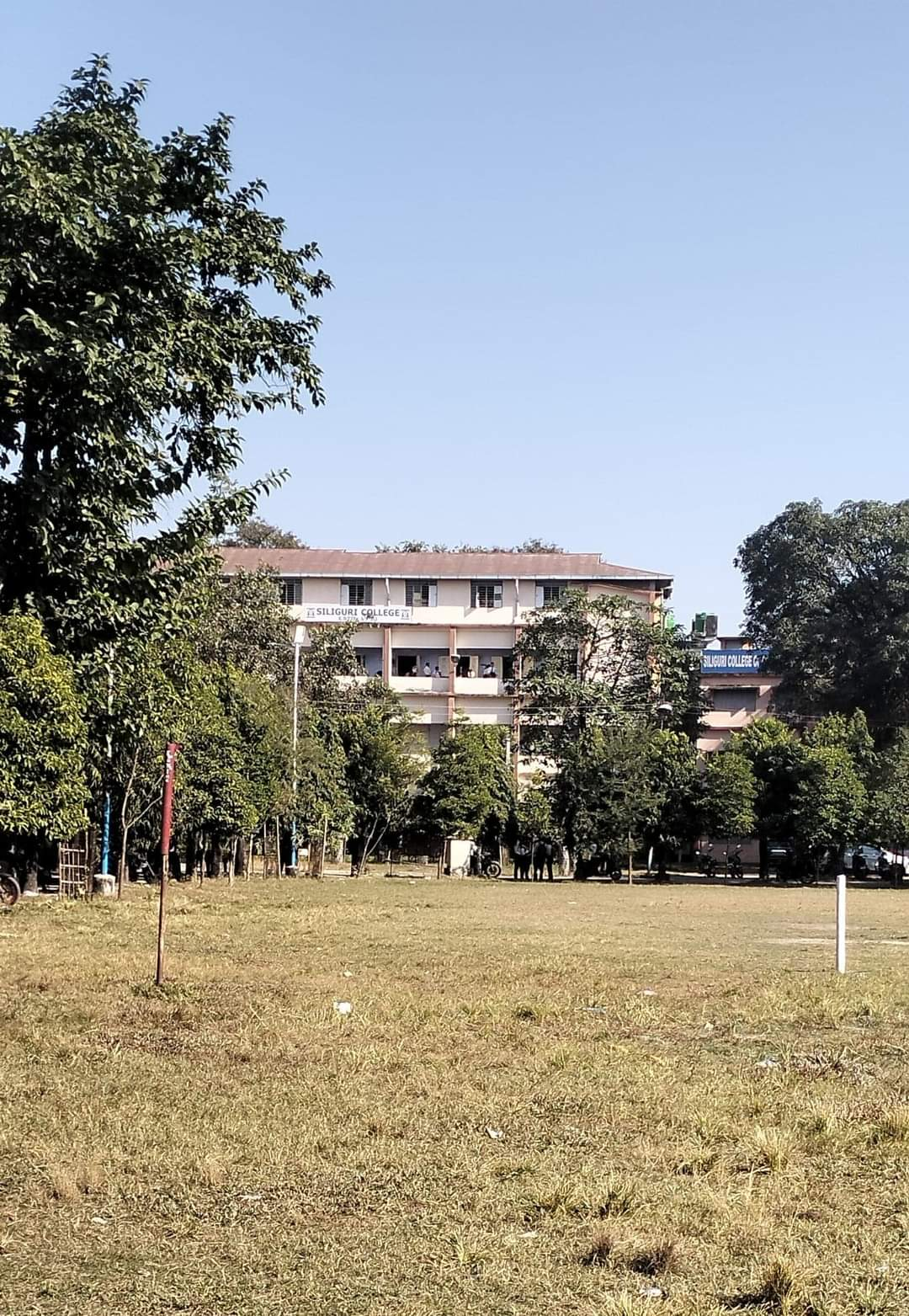
Siliguri College Playground

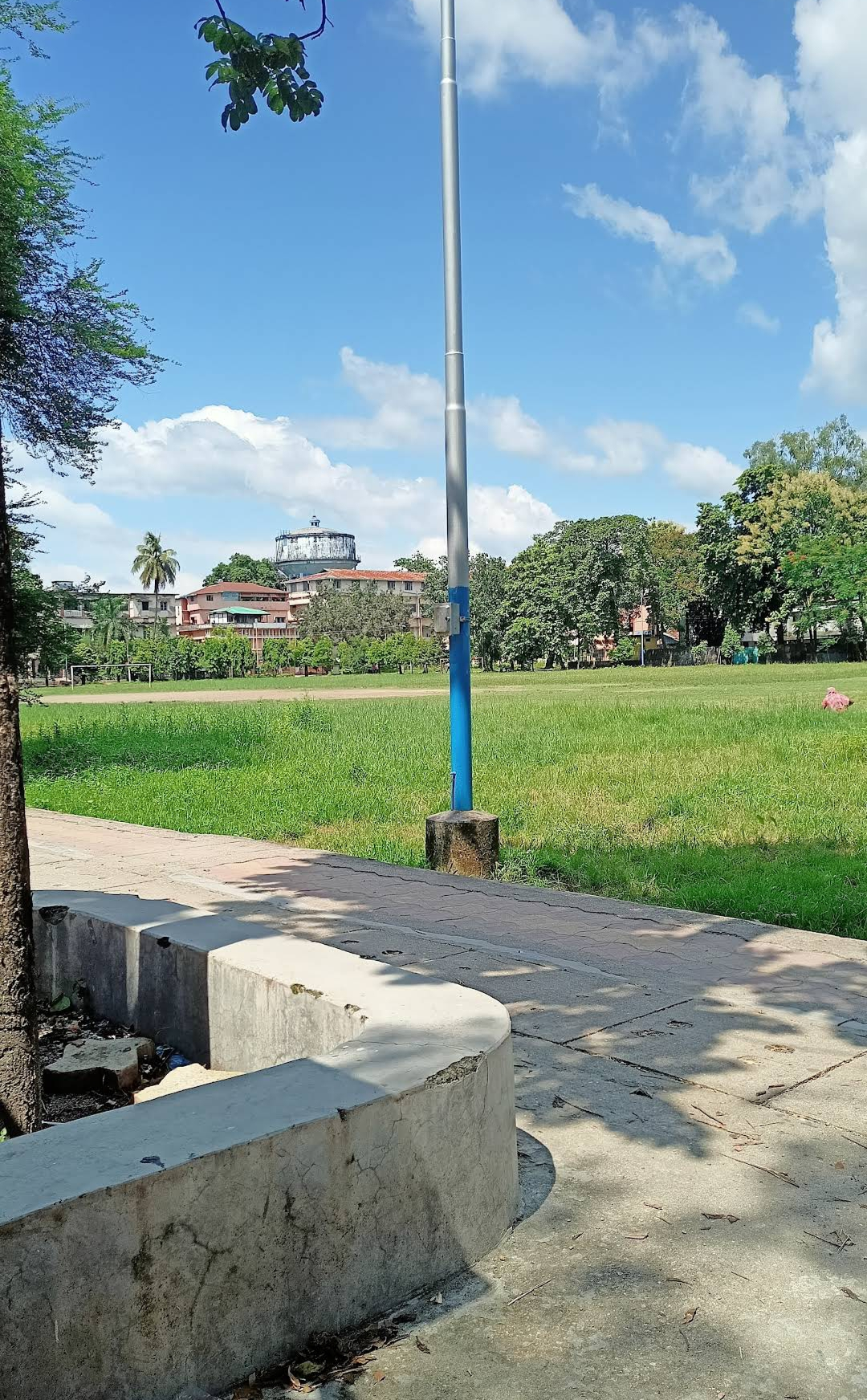
Siliguri College Playground

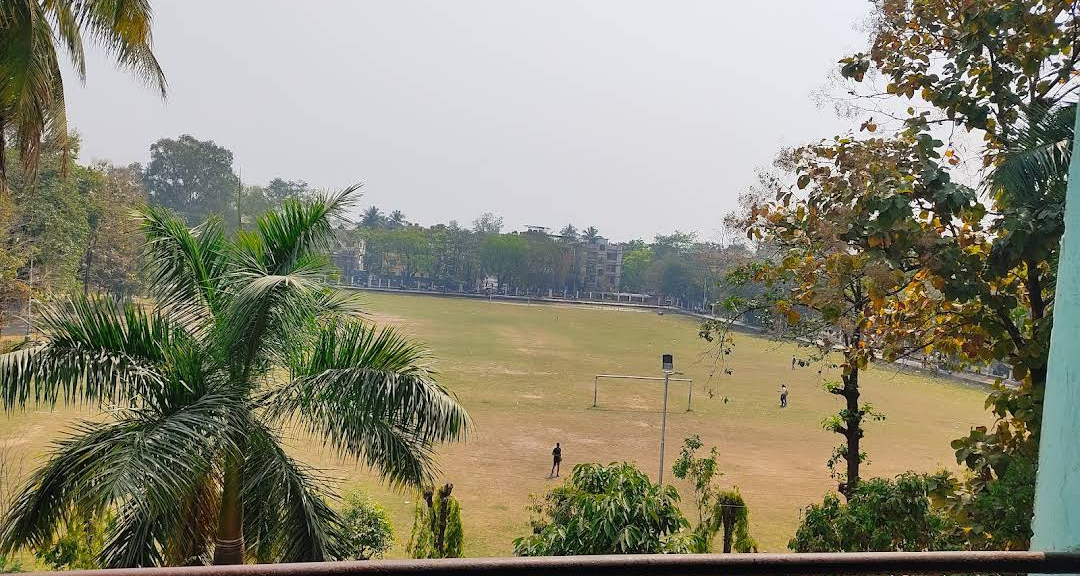
Siliguri College Playground

== See also ==
- List of institutions of higher education in West Bengal
- Education in India
- Education in West Bengal
- Siliguri Mahila Mahavidyalaya
- Siliguri College of Commerce
