= Ashish Dhawan =

Indian philanthropist (born 1969)

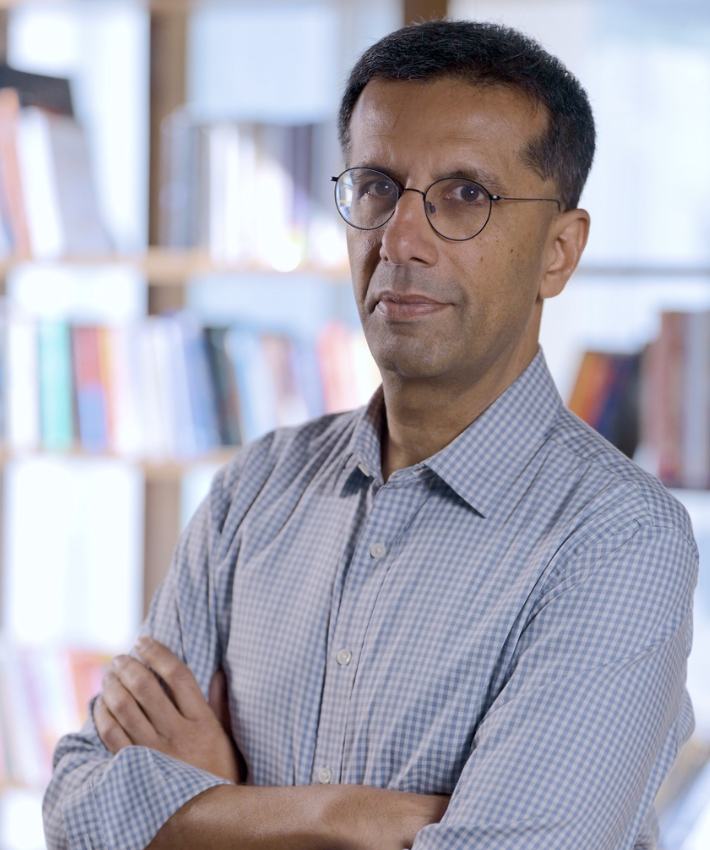
- Born: Ashish Dhawan; March 11, 1969 (age 57); New Delhi, India
- Education: Harvard Business School; Yale University
- Occupations: Philanthropist; Former private equity investor
- Known for: Founder-Chairperson of The Convergence Foundation; Founding Chairperson of the Board of Trustees of Ashoka University; Co-Founder of ChrysCapital
- Board member of: Gates Foundation
- Spouse: Manisha Dhawan (m. 1998)
- Website: CentralSquareFoundation.org TheConvergenceFoundation

Ashish Dhawan (born March 11, 1969) is an Indian philanthropist and former private equity investor who co-founded one of India's leading private equity funds, Chrysalis Capital (ChrysCapital). He is the Founder-Chairperson of The Convergence Foundation and Central Square Foundation, and Founding Chairperson of the Board of Trustees of Ashoka University.

He also serves on the board of trustees of Gates Foundation since 2022.

== Education ==
Ashish attended St. Xavier's Collegiate School, followed by St. James' School in Kolkata. He is a graduate of Yale University, where he earned a bachelor of science degree in applied mathematics and economics, and Harvard Business School, where he earned his MBA.

== Career ==
From 1992 to 1993, Ashish worked on the Wall Street at a boutique investment bank, Wasserstein Perella & Co., where he was the only Indian analyst. He then moved to McCown DeLeeuw & Co., an eight-person private equity firm in California, where he was the junior-most associate.

After completing his MBA in 1997, Ashish went to work at Goldman Sachs, where he was part of the Risk Arbitrage Group. At the age of 29, he decided to leave New York to return to India.

In 1999, he co-founded ChrysCapital in Mumbai with Raj Kondur, a classmate from Harvard Business School.

== Philanthropy ==
In 2012, Ashish left his career as a private equity investor to establish Central Square Foundation (CSF), a non-profit organisation focused on ensuring quality school education for all children in India. CSF's mission is to create effective, scalable, and sustainable change in the school education system in India, by focusing on Foundational Literacy & Numeracy (FLN); EdTech & AI; Early Childhood Education (ECE); School Governance; and High Potential Students.

In 2014, he spearheaded the launch of Ashoka University, billed as India's first "Ivy-league-caliber" liberal arts university, together with other Indian philanthropists and entrepreneurs.

His focus then expanded to include institutions for building leadership (India Leaders for the Social Sector), curbing air pollution (Air Pollution Action Group), enhancing government effectiveness (Centre for Effective Governance of Indian States), and driving strategic philanthropy (Accelerate Indian Philanthropy).

In 2021, The Convergence Foundation (TCF) was established to give form to Ashish and Manisha Dhawan's philanthropic vision. TCF is an Indian philanthropic foundation. It incubates and partners with mission-driven nonprofit organisations working on job creating economic growth, human capital development, and growing the development sector. The TCF network now includes more than 20 non-profits dedicated to addressing India’s biggest challenges. These organisations address critical capacity gaps, inform policymaking, and introduce solutions, working in close partnership with governments at various levels.

Ashish also endowed the Renu and Anand Dhawan Professorship at Yale University to bolster scholarship in India and South Asia Studies.

== Accolades ==
In 2012, Ashish was recognised as the NextGen Leader in Philanthropy by Forbes India for his charitable work. He also placed 15th on the 2014 Hurun India Philanthropy List, a ranking of the most generous individuals in India produced by Hurun Research Institute.
