= Andaman Law College =

Government law school in India

Coordinates: 11.6706°N 92.7368°E

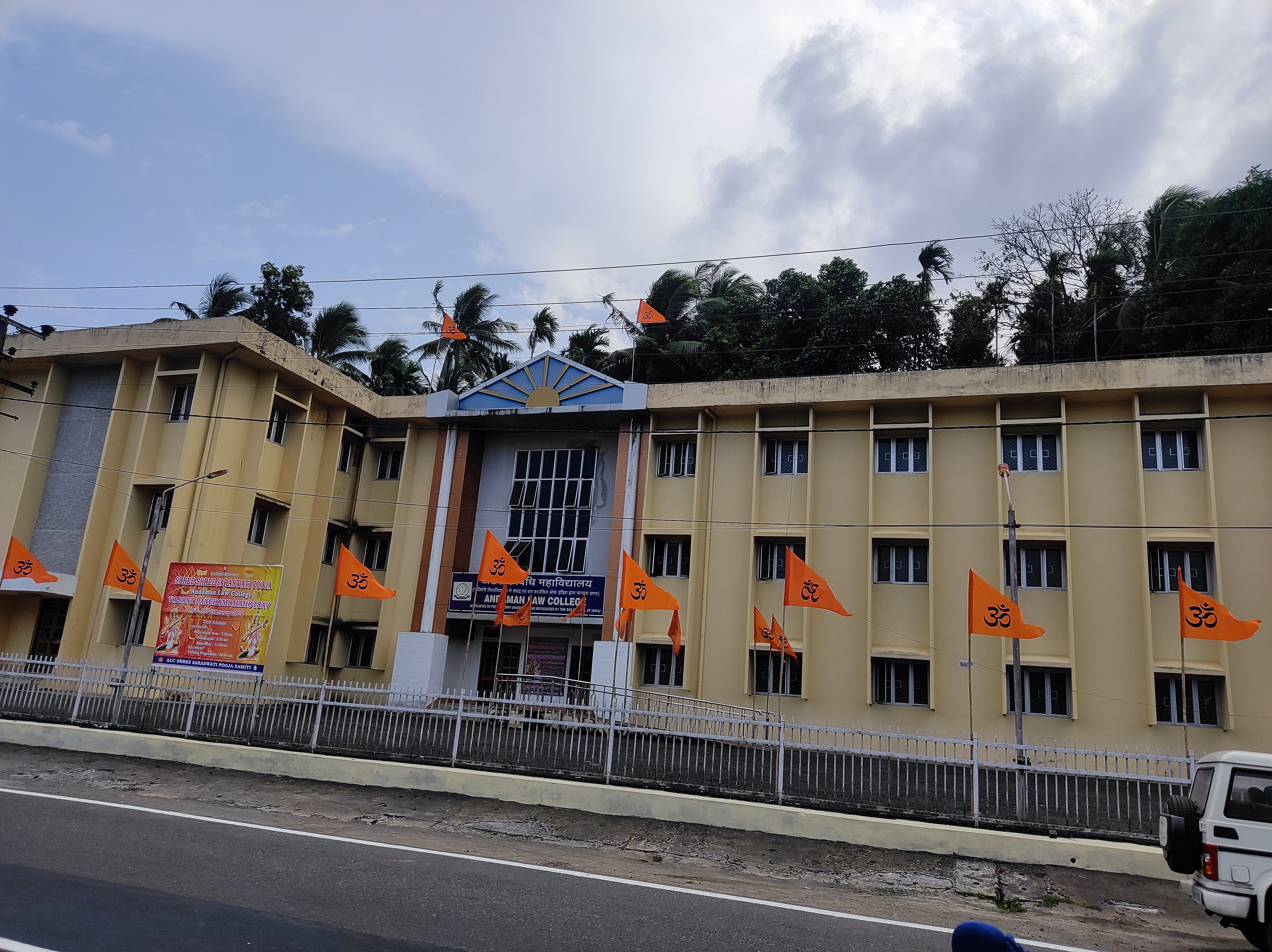
- Andaman Law College
- Motto: धर्मो रक्षति रक्षितः
- Motto in English: Dharma, being preserved, preserves.
- Type: Public
- Established: 2016
- Affiliations: Pondicherry University, Bar Council of India
- Principal: Prashant Bhadu (In-Charge)
- Faculty: 7 (2022)
- Administrative staff: 8
- Undergraduates: 45 (B.A.LL.B.) per year
- Location: Phoenix Bay, Port Blair
- Website: andamanlawcollege.andaman.gov.in

Andaman Law College (ALC) is a government law school in Port Blair, India. It was established in 2016 by the Andaman & Nicobar Islands Legal Education Society (ANILES) under Andaman & Nicobar Administration, and is entirely government-funded. It is run by the ANILES with Hon'ble Lt. Governor as its president, Hon'ble Chief Secretary as its chairman and the Law Secretary as its Vice Chairman. The institute has a moderately sized interim campus in Transport Bhawan, Phoenix Bay, Port Blair.

== Organization and administration ==
There are 10 full time faculty members, including the principal, who are recruited according to University Grants Commission norms by a six-member board. The college is affiliated to Pondicherry University and approved by the Bar Council of India.

== Academics ==
The college admits 45 students for the graduate program of Bachelor of Laws (B.A.LL.B.) annually. Admission is made as per the prevalent Rules and Regulations of the Government of India and the A&N Administration relating to reservation in the A&N Islands.

== Library ==
The library of the Andaman Law College has a collection of over 3029 books covering general and special subjects including textbooks, reference books, journals, reports, legal periodicals, etc. The E-Library provides access to online legal research databases for both students and faculty. The library functions from 09:00 am till 05:00 pm on all working days of the week.

== Controversies ==
On 24 November 2022, an unusual delay in conducting of first counselling for the session of 2022-2023 occurred. The ABVP Student Leader Siddhanth Rai Sharma solicited the college authorities and Andaman and Nicobar administration to conduct the counselling sessions with immediate action. However a press release announcing the date for the first counselling 2022-2023 was released the same day.

== Student activities ==
Every year, the students of law college celebrate Freshers day in odd semester and Annual day in even semester. The college organised National Seminar on Socio-Legal Rights of Tribals in Andaman & Nicobar Islands: Issues & Challenges on 16 & 17 March 2018. The law professors provide 100% free legal aid every Wednesday afternoon in the Legal Aid Clinic of the college regardless of income, race, sex and domicile. The Students of Andaman Law College are also engaged in Social work, in the year of 2018 when state of Kerala was suffering from a flood the students of Andaman Law College contributed in ABVP'S Kerala flood Relief funds. The fundraising was led by K Sneha 3rd year student of ALC along with Roban Antony state Executive member ABVP ANI. The students of the college along with the faculties regularly participate in Lok Adalat sittings organised by the District Legal Services Authority.

=== Debate competitions ===
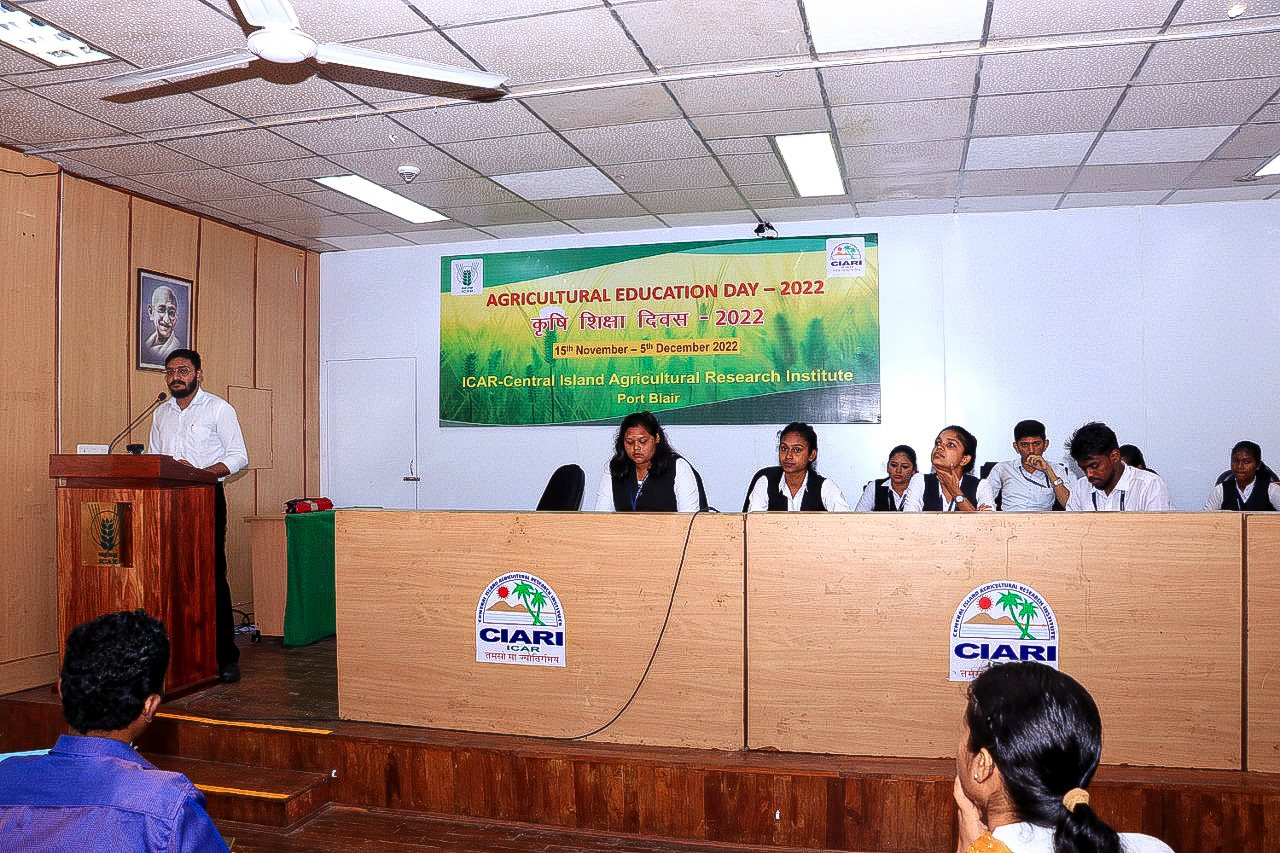
Students Panel representing Andaman Law College in a Debate organized by ICAR-Central Island Agricultural Research Institute

On 16 November 2022, A panel of Andaman Law College represented the college in a debate competition. The Inter-College debate competition was organized by ICAR-Central Island Agricultural Research Institute (Andaman & Nicobar Islands) on the topic “Whether agriculture, animal husbandry and fisheries are promising professional career or not?”. Two panels argued on behalf of Andaman Law college in debate competition. The panels was headed by Mr. Siddhanth Rai Sharma & Miss. Pooja Chetri.

The team of Andaman Law college secured 1st position in the debate competition. The team was felicitated during Valedictory Ceremony by the officials & guest of Honors of ICAR-Central Island Agricultural Research Institute.

=== Saraswati Pooja Celebration ===
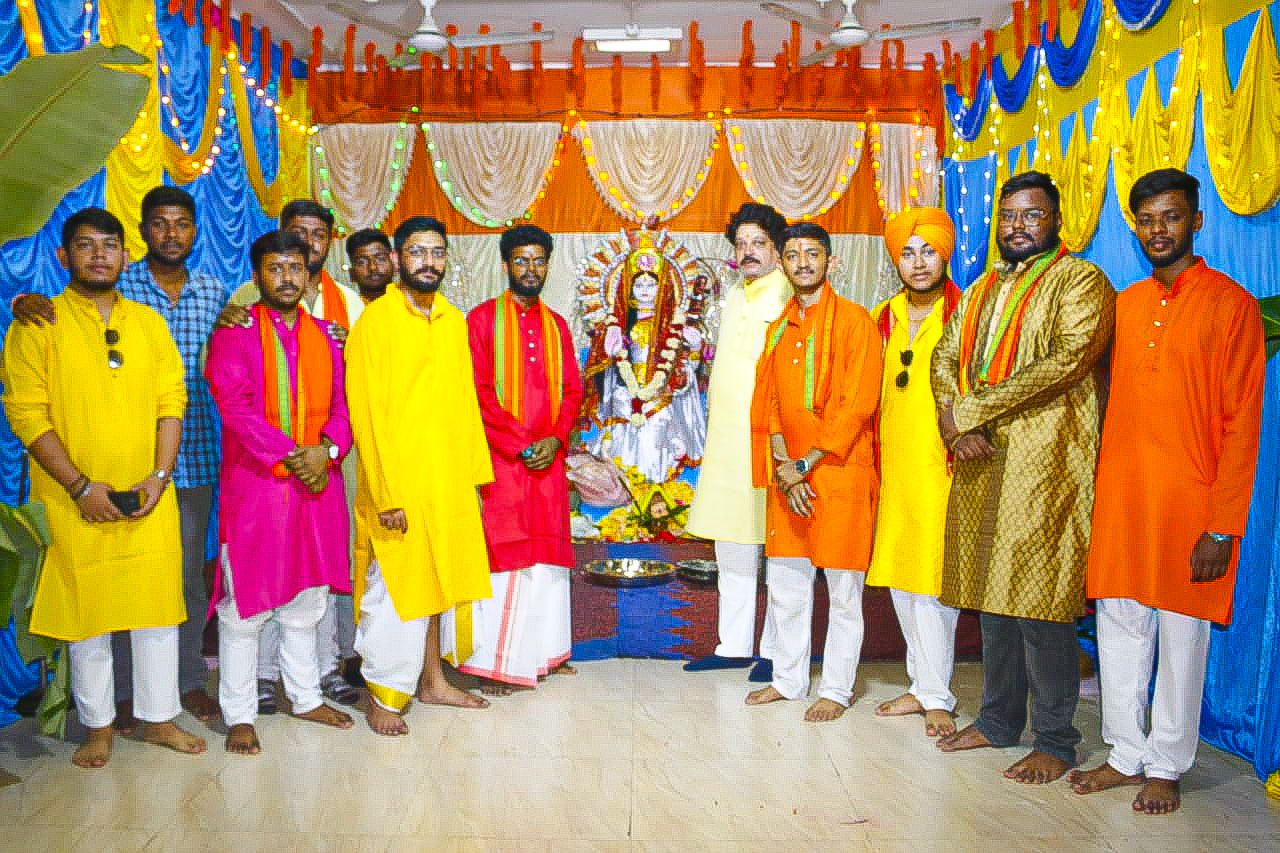
Siddhanth Rai Sharma along with his Organizing team on Shree Saraswati Pooja at Andaman Law College

On 14 February 2024 on the occasion of Vasant Panchami, Andaman Law College celebrated 1st Shree Saraswati Pooja in the college campus.The celebration of festival was supplied with Pooja, Hawan, cultural events, Maha Bhoj (community lunch).

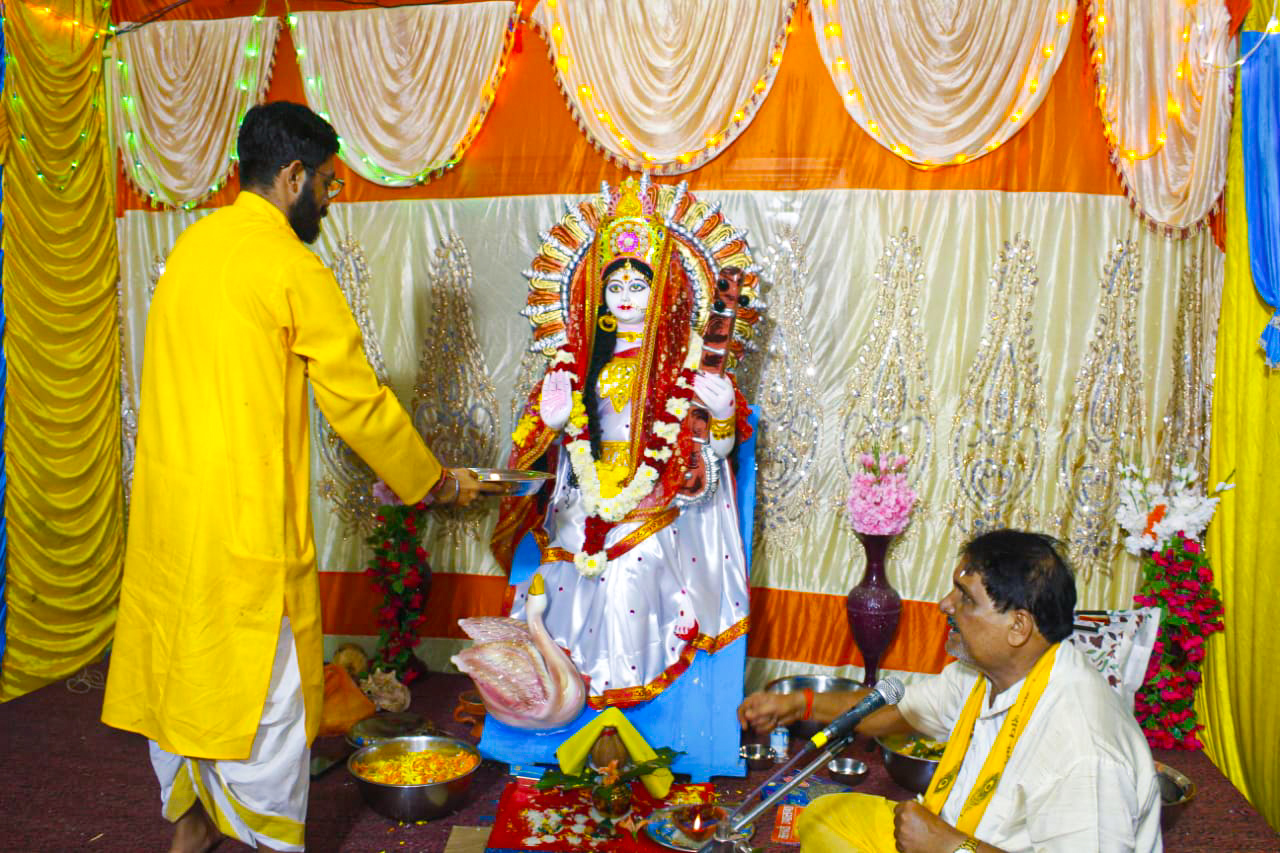
Student Leader Siddhanth Rai Sharma performing the aarti of Mata Saraswati

The whole event was organised and coordinated by ALC Shree Saraswati Pooja Samiti Under the chairmanship of Siddhanth Rai Sharma.

== See also ==
- Jawaharlal Nehru Rajkeeya Mahavidyalaya, Port Blair
- Mahatma Gandhi Government College, Mayabunder
- Andaman and Nicobar Islands Institute of Medical Sciences, Port Blair
- Dr. B. R. Ambedkar Institute of Technology
