= Andaman and Nicobar Islands =

Union territory of India

- Union territory
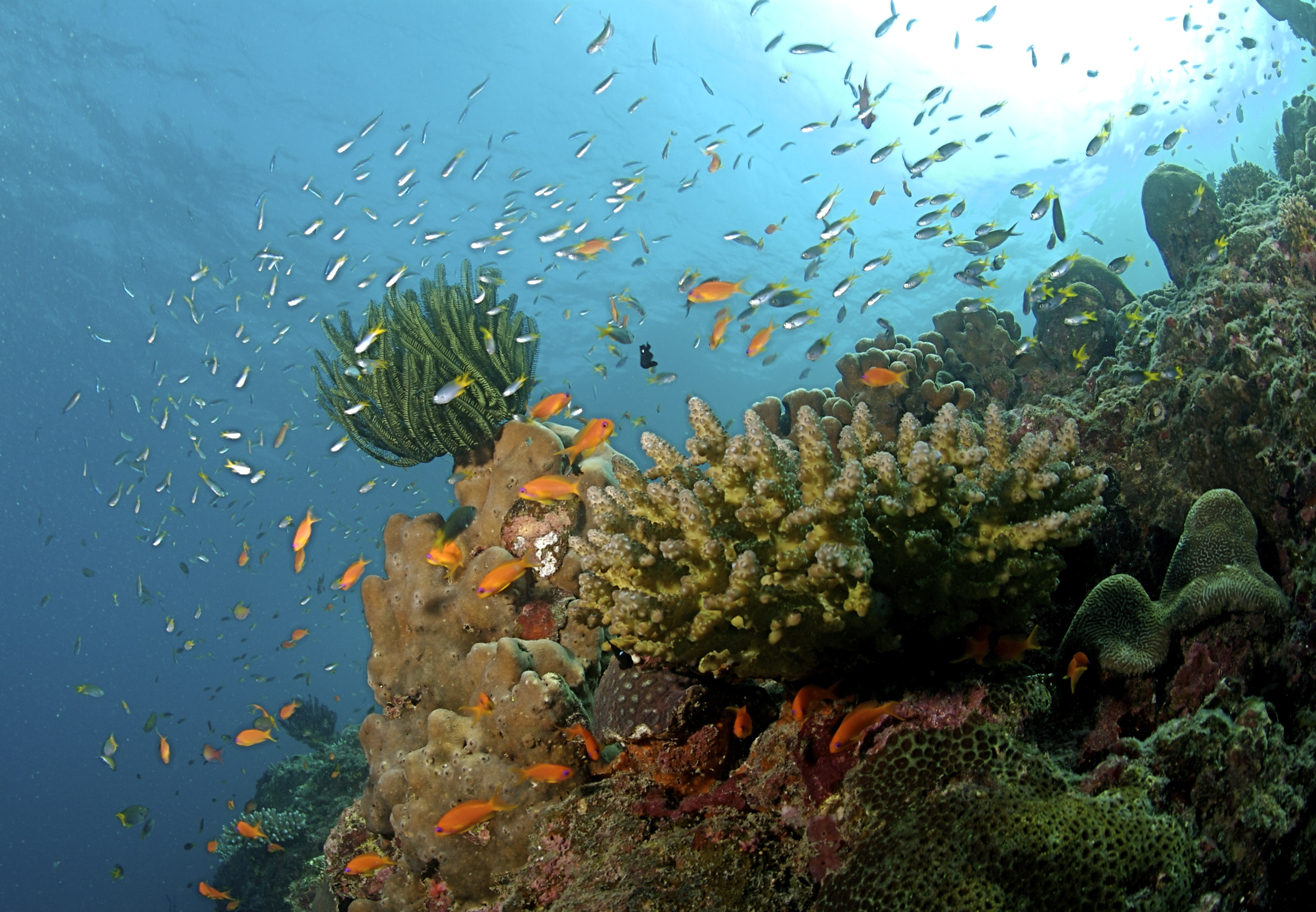
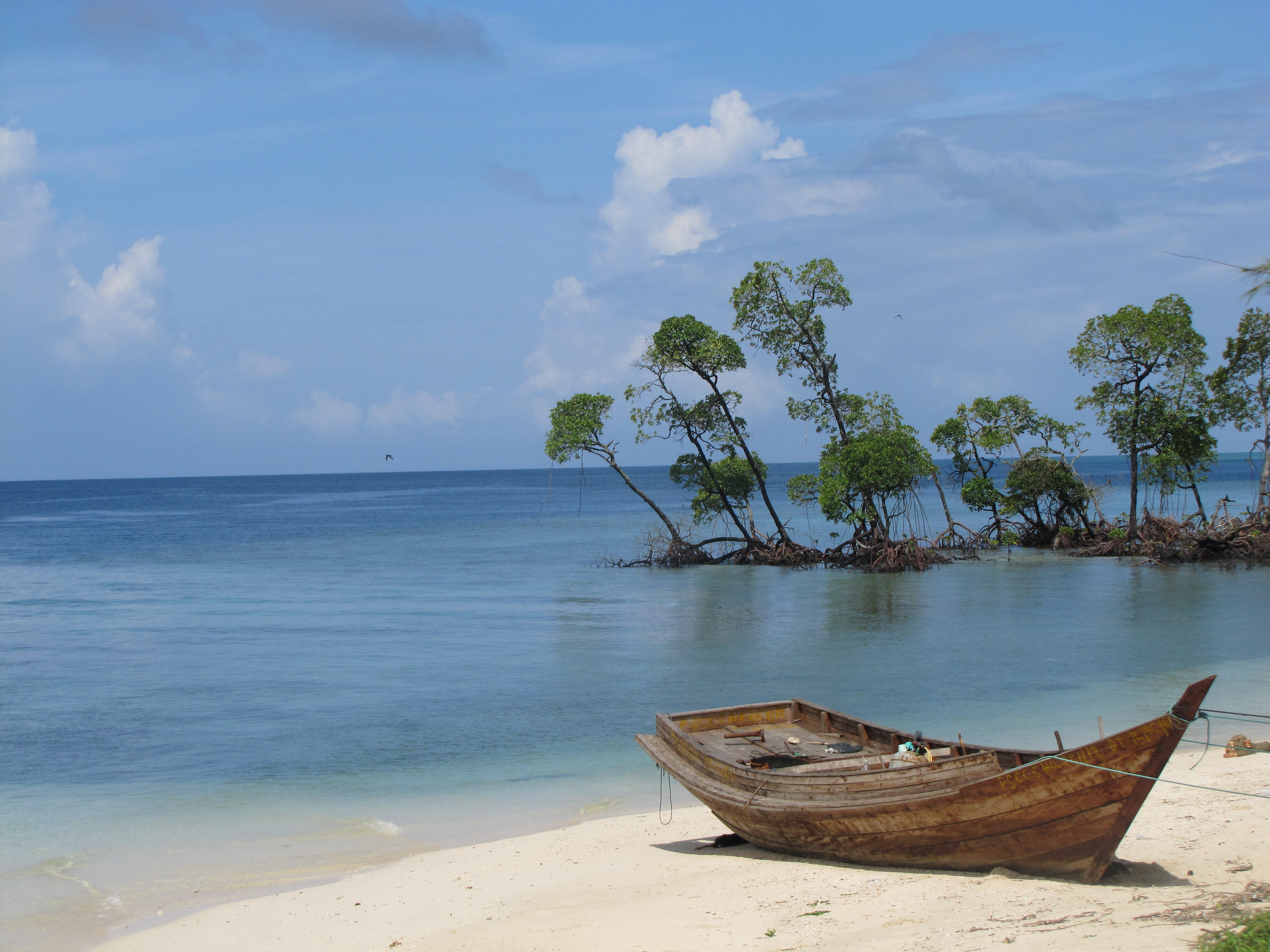
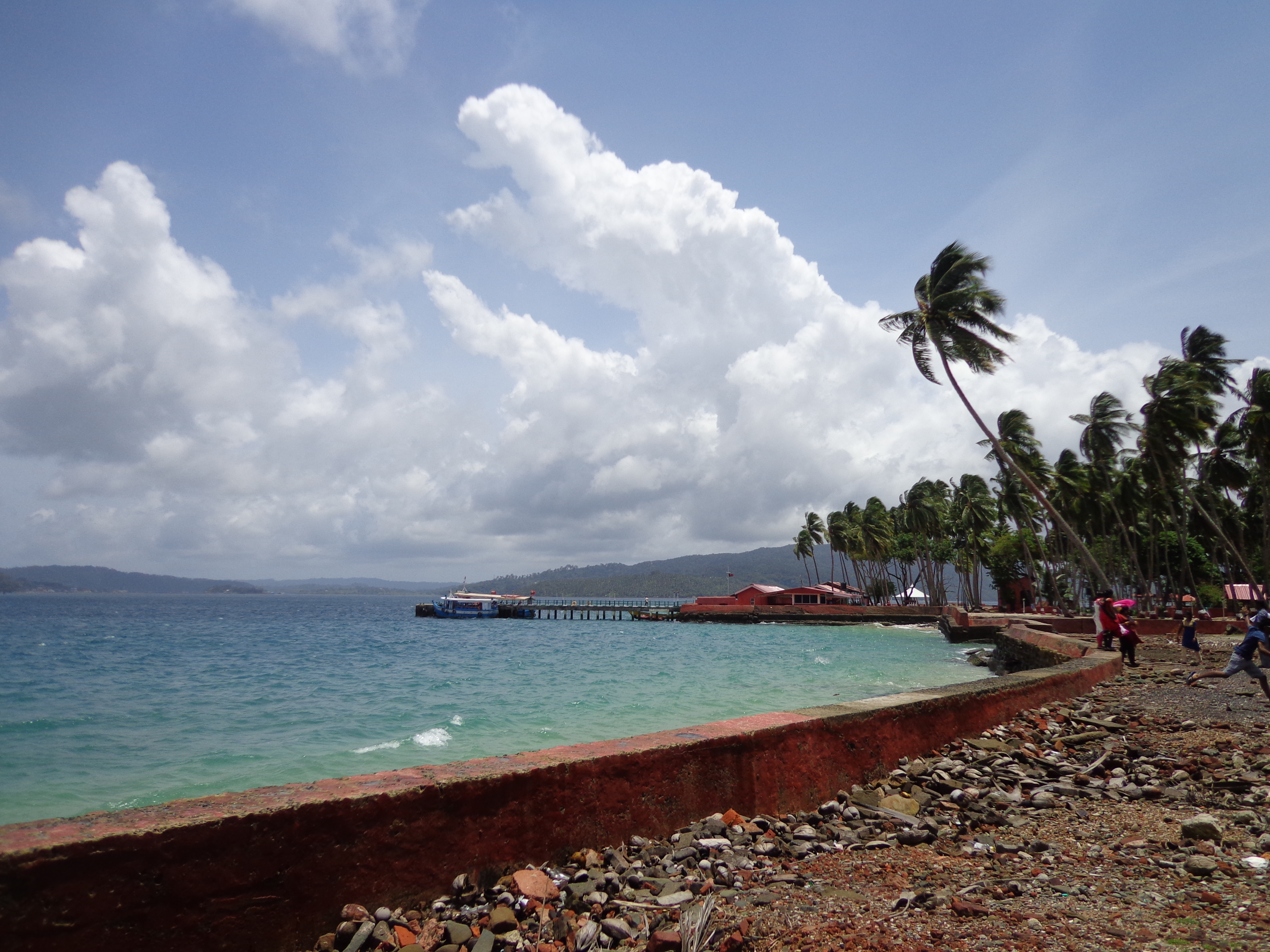
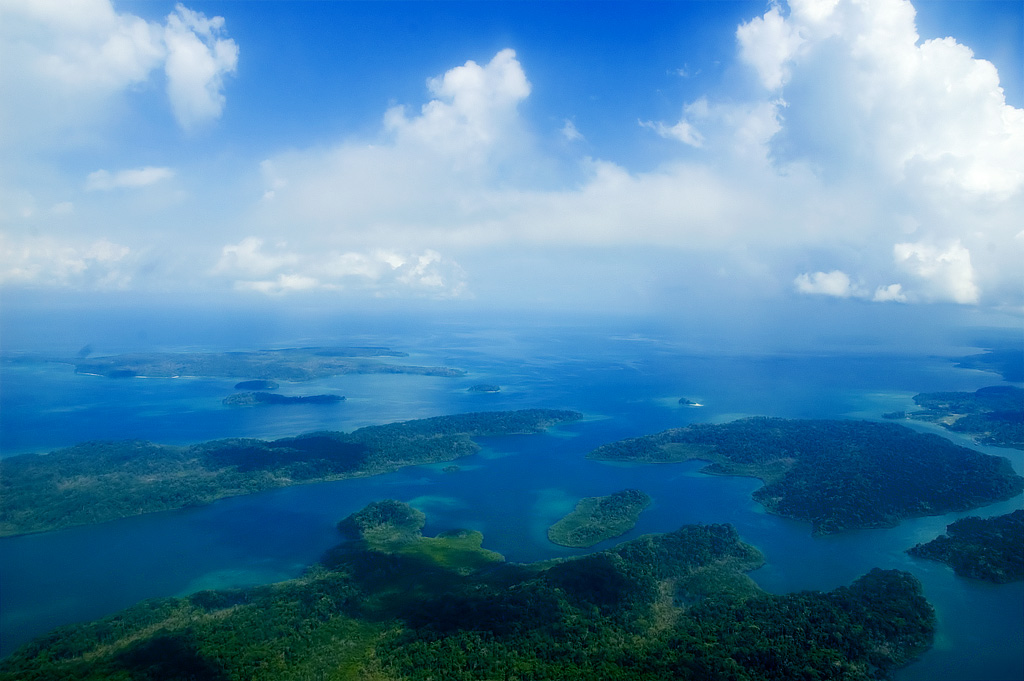
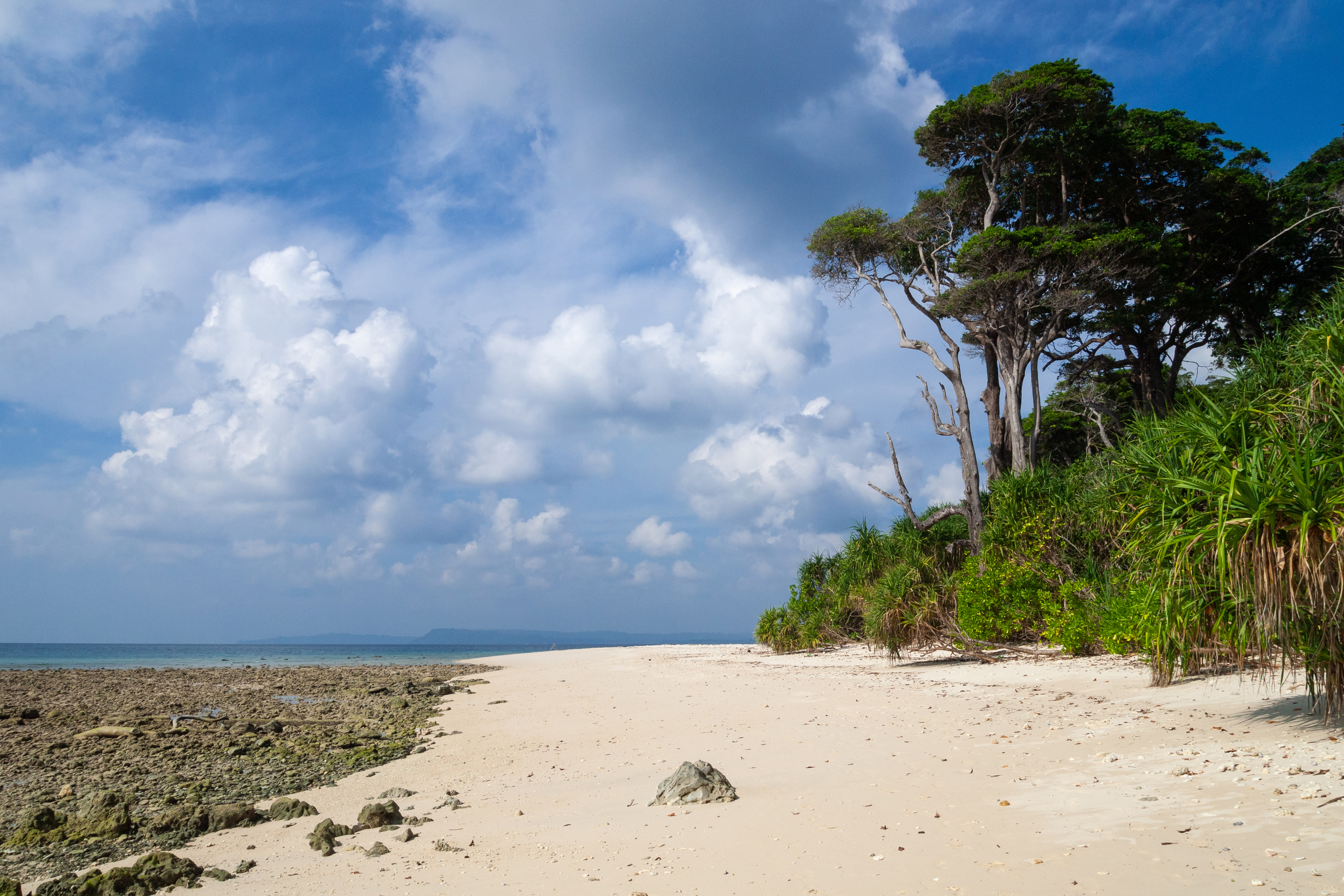
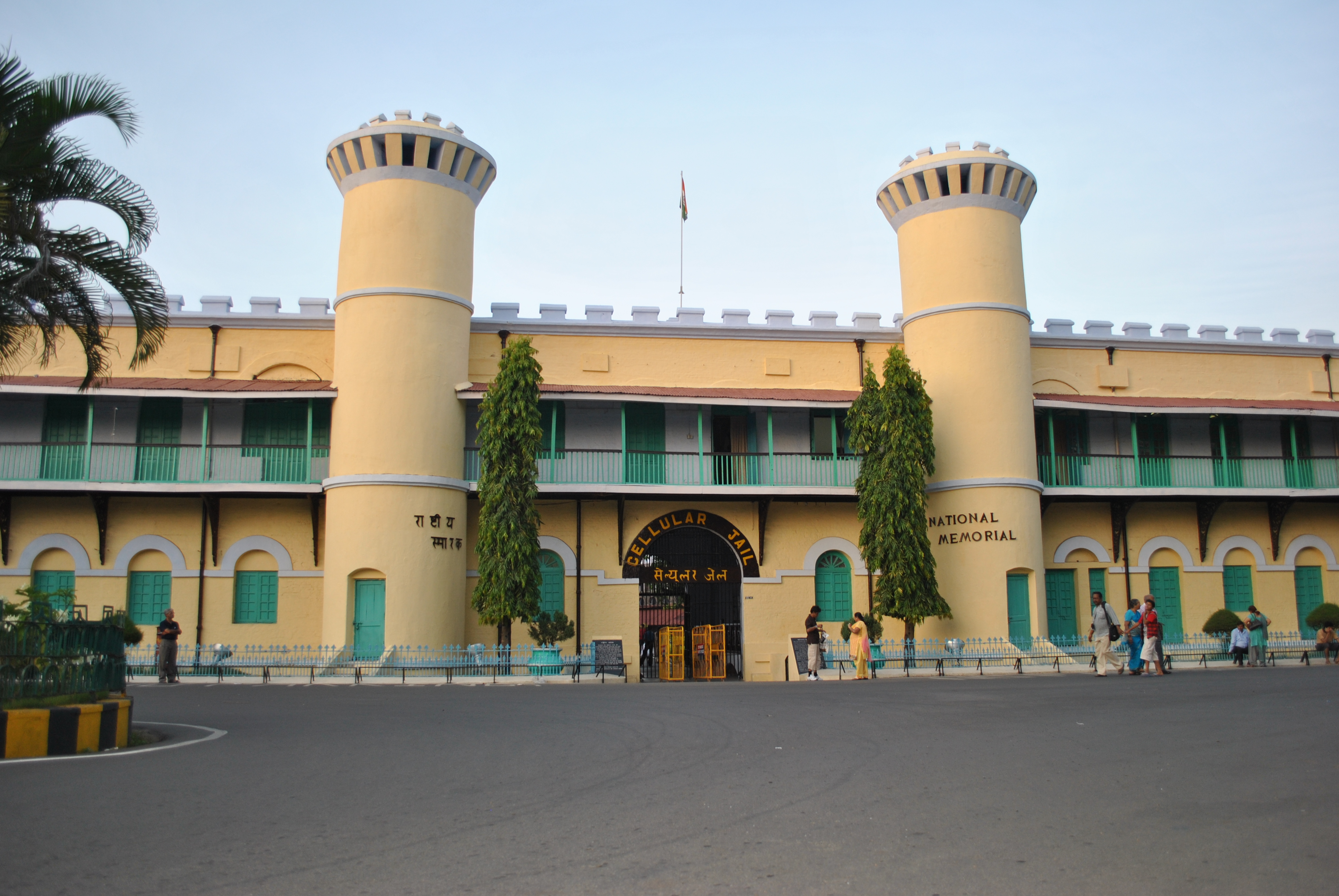
- Coral reefs around the islands Havelock Island in the Andaman Islands Ross Island The Andaman Sea Beach at Neil Island Cellular Jail in Port Blair

- Emblem of Andaman and Nicobar Islands
- Motto: Satyameva Jayate (Sanskrit) "Truth alone triumphs"
- Location of Andaman and Nicobar Islands in India
- Coordinates: 11.68°N 92.72°E
- Country: India
- Region: East India
- Formation: 1 November 1956
- Capital and largest city: Port Blair
- Districts: 3

Government
  - Body: Government of Andaman and Nicobar Islands
  - Lieutenant Governor: Dinesh Sharma
  - Chief Secretary: Gyanesh Bharti, IAS

Area
  - Total: 8,249 km^{2} (3,185 sq mi)
  - Rank: 29th

Dimensions
  - Length: 467 km (290 mi)
  - Width: 24 km (15 mi)
- Highest elevation (Saddle Peak): 732 m (2,402 ft)
- Lowest elevation (Andaman Sea and Bay of Bengal): 0 m (0 ft)

Population (2011)
  - Total: 380,581
  - Rank: 34th
  - Density: 46/km^{2} (120/sq mi)
  - Urban: 37.7%
  - Rural: 62.3%
- Demonym(s): Andamanese, Nicobarese

Language
  - Official: Hindi; English
  - Official script: Devanagari; Latin

GDP
  - Total (2023–24): ▲₹0.12499 lakh crore (US$1.3 billion)
  - Rank: 33rd
  - Per capita: ₹310,143 (equivalent to ₹340,000 or US$3,600 in 2026) (16th)
- Time zone: UTC+05:30 (IST)
- ISO 3166 code: IN-AN
- Vehicle registration: AN
- HDI (2022): ▲0.706 High (11th)
- Literacy (2024): 91.1 (11th)
- Sex ratio (2011): 876♀/1000 ♂ (22nd)
- Website: andamannicobar.gov.in
- Symbols of Andaman and Nicobar Islands
- Bird: Andaman wood pigeon
- Flower: Pyinma
- Mammal: Dugong
- Tree: Andaman Padauk
- List of Indian state and union territory symbols

The Andaman and Nicobar Islands is a union territory of India comprising 836 islands, of which only 31 are inhabited. The islands are grouped into two main clusters: the northern Andaman Islands and the southern Nicobar Islands, separated by the 150 km (93 mi)-wide Ten Degree Channel. The capital and largest city of the territory, Port Blair (officially Sri Vijaya Puram), is located approximately 1,190 km (740 mi) from Chennai and 1,255 km (780 mi) from Kolkata in mainland India. The islands are situated between the Bay of Bengal to the west and the Andaman Sea to the east. The northernmost point is 901 km (560 mi) from the mouth of the Hooghly River. Indira Point, located at 6°45'10″N and 93°49'36″E on the southern tip of Great Nicobar, is the southernmost point of India.

The territory shares maritime borders with Indonesia located about 165 km (103 mi) to the south, Myanmar located 280 km (170 mi) to the north-east and Thailand located 650 km (400 mi) to the south-east. The islands occupy a total land area of approximately 8,249 km^{2} (3,185 sq mi) with a population of 380,581 as per the 2011 census. The territory is divided into three districts: Nicobar, South Andaman, and North and Middle Andaman with the capitals at Car Nicobar, Port Blair and Mayabunder respectively.

Genetic and cultural studies suggest that the indigenous Andamanese people may have been isolated from other populations during the Middle Paleolithic era, more than 30,000 years ago. Archeological evidence of civilisation has been dated back to 2,200 years. In the 11th century, Cholas, one of the three Tamil kingdoms, used the islands as a naval base to launch expeditions in South East Asia. The Danish were the first Europeans to arrive on the islands in 1755. The islands became part of the British Raj in 1868. During the Second World War, the islands were invaded by the Empire of Japan. After Indian Independence in 1947, the region automatically became a province of the Dominion of India and was later designated as a union territory following the adoption of the Constitution of India in 1950.

The islands host the Andaman and Nicobar Command, the only geographical command operated jointly by the three major wings of the Indian Armed Forces: the Army, the Air Force and the Navy. While Hindi and English are the official languages, the major spoken languages include Bengali, Tamil and Telugu. Indigenous people speak any of the Andamanese or Nicobarese family of languages. Hinduism is the majority religion in the union territory, with a significant Christian minority. The islands include North Sentinel Island, home to the Sentinelese people, an uncontacted tribe.

== Etymology ==
The name Andaman might have been derived from Handuman, after the Indian God Hanuman from the Hindu epic Ramayana. The place was called with a similar name by the Malays, who used to be involved in slave trade in the region. The place was also referred by various names such as Angademan by Ptolemy in the 2nd century CE and Angamanian by Marco Polo in 13th century. Nicobar, which was located in the sea route connecting South India to South East Asia, was known as Nakkavaram, meaning "open/naked land" borrowed from Tamil language which later became Nicobar. In the middle ages (500–1500 AD), Nicobar was known as Lankhabatus in Arabia, probably a mis-transcription of the name Nakkavaram. An 11th-century work Kathasaritsagar indicates the name as Narkel Dweep (meaning Coconut Island in Bengali). Marco Polo termed the island as Necuverann, while the islands were known as Lo-Jan Kuo in China, a translation of Nakkavar with the same meaning.

== History ==
=== Early history ===
Genetic and cultural studies suggest that the indigenous Andamanese people may have been isolated from other populations during the Middle Paleolithic era, which ended 30,000 years ago. Archeological work on the islands has concentrated on shell midden sites. The islands were mentioned by Ptolemy in the 2nd century CE.

=== Middle Ages ===
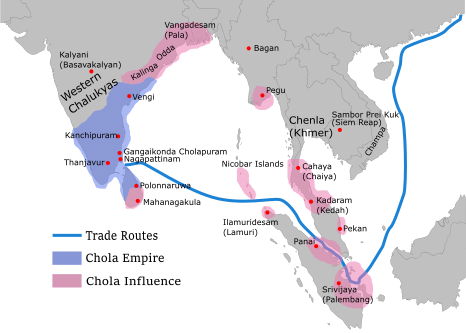
The Cholas used the islands as a naval base in the 11th century to launch attacks in South East Asia.

The Nicobar islands existed on a major trade route connecting India to the South East Asia and had much contact with the outside world for centuries. But there are very few accounts of information as there was no written language with the indigenous people to document their history. The islands appeared in the accounts of travellers like Faxian in the 6th century and Yijing in the 7th century.

In the 11th century, Rajendra Chola I of the Chola dynasty invaded parts of South East Asia using the Nicobar islands as an intermediate naval base. It was part of an established Chola trade route connecting India and South East Asia, a practice that continued during the subsequent reigns of Rajendra II and Kulothunga I. Chola inscriptions from Thanjavur, dated to 1050, describe the islands as Ma-Nakkavaram meaning "great open/naked land" in Tamil. The islands were later noted by Marco Polo in the 13th century and Friar Oderic in the early 14th century.

=== European colonisation ===
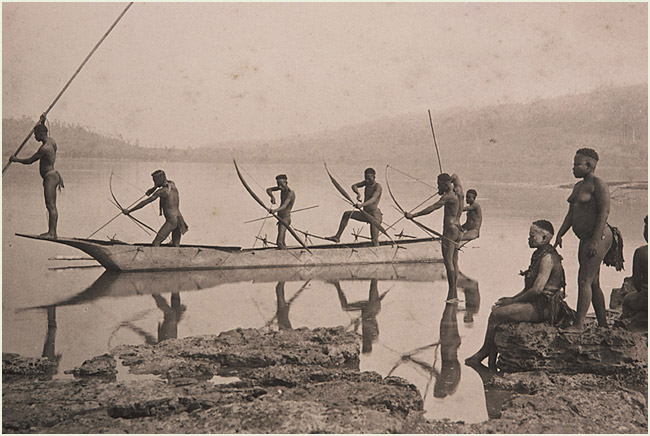
Andamanese fishing (c. 1870)

The European colonisation on the islands began when settlers from the Danish East India Company arrived on the Nicobar Islands on 12 December 1755. On 1 January 1756, the Nicobar Islands were made into a Danish colony, first named Nye Danmark (New Denmark) and later Frederiksøerne (Frederick's Islands). The islands were managed from the Danish colony of Tranquebar in the Indian mainland. However, various attempts to settle on the islands were unsuccessful due to repeated outbreaks of malaria, which led to the death of the colonists.

Between 1778 and 1783, William Bolts tried to establish an Austrian colony on the Nicobar islands, mistakenly assuming that the Danish had abandoned the claims to the islands, renaming them Theresa islands. In 1789, Archibald Blair of the Royal Indian Navy colonised the Andaman islands, and established a naval base. In 1794, a penal colony was established on the Chatham island and the first batch of 100 prisoners were sent to the island. The prisoners were used for labour, and worked under a civil contract. After two years, the colony was abandoned. The settlement was abandoned in 1796.

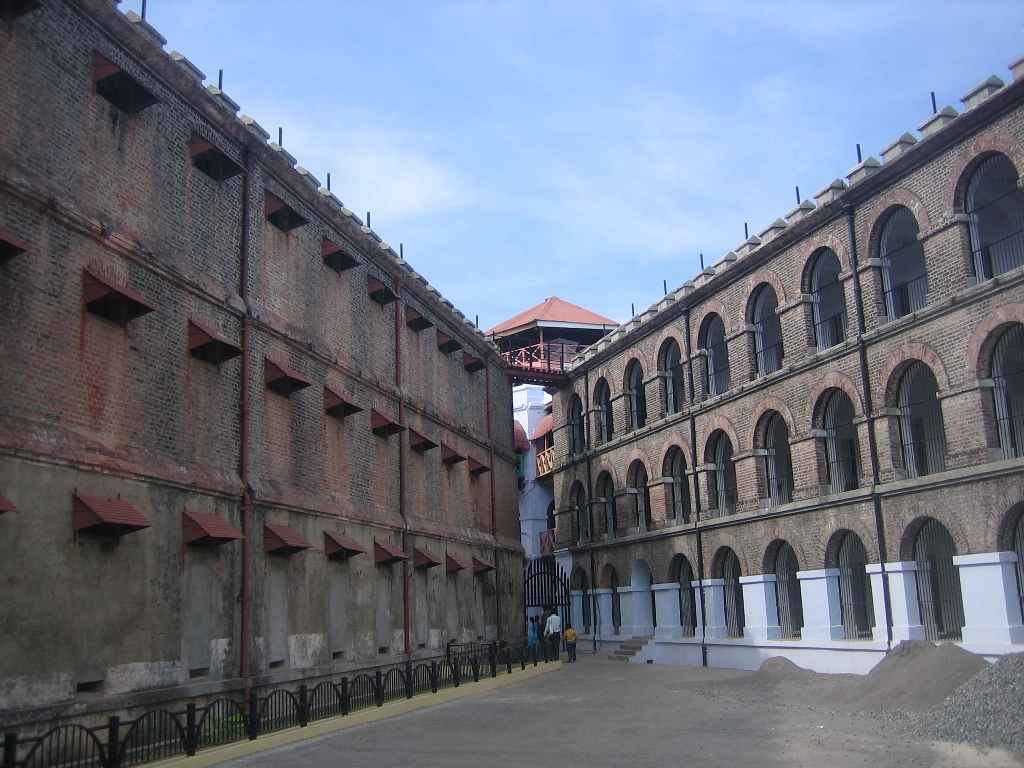
Cellular Jail in Port Blair constructed during the British Raj

In February 1858, the British re-established a colony in Port Blair. A new penal colony was established on the Ross Island near Port Blair, mainly to house the prisoners of the Indian rebellion of 1857, and the first set of 200 convicts arrived at the island in March 1858. The prisoners were used for hard labour and the clearing of forests led to frequent confrontation with the native Andamanese people. Many of the prisoners died in conflict, while some were hanged for trying to escape, apart from deaths due to disease and starvation. Between 1864 and 1868, Italy tried to buy the Nicobar islands from the Danish. On 16 October 1868, the Danish sold the rights to the Nicobar islands to the British, which was made part of the British India in 1869. In 1872, the Andaman and Nicobar Islands were united under a single command and administered by a chief commissioner based out of Port Blair. The construction of the Cellular Jail started in 1896 and was completed in 1906. The jail was used to house political prisoners and independence activists away from the Indian mainland.

=== World War II ===
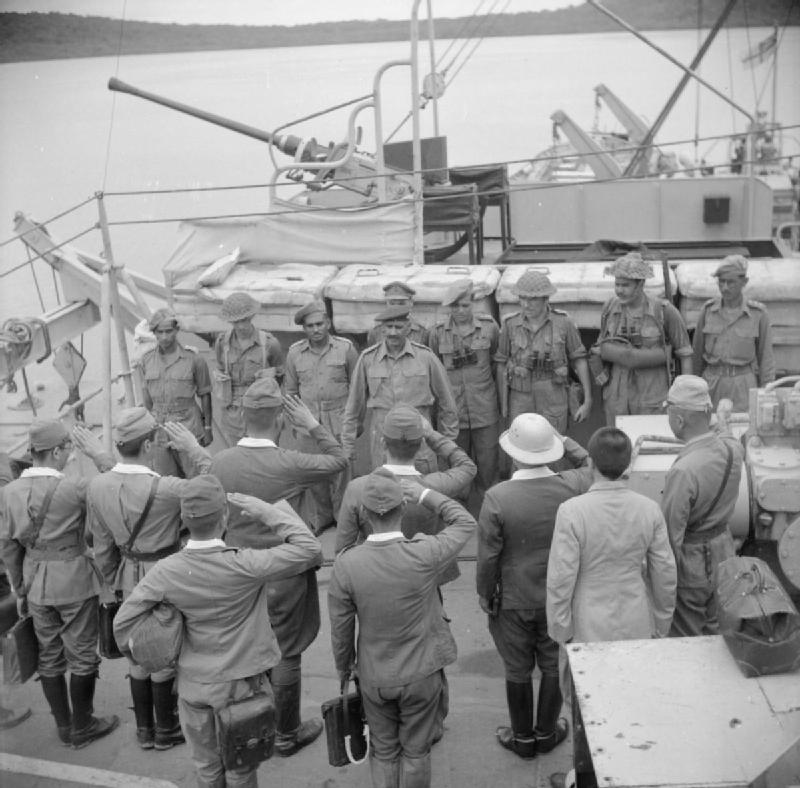
Surrender of the Japanese to Nathu Singh aboard HMS Rocksand in 1945

During Second World War, the Andaman and Nicobar islands were invaded by Japan. The Japanese captured Port Blair on 23 March 1942 and established control over the islands. Japan gave provisional control of the islands to the Azad Hind organisation of Subhash Chandra Bose on 29 December 1943, and the Andaman and Nicobar islands were renamed as Shaheed-Dweep (Martyr island) and Swaraj-dweep (Self-rule island) respectively. Bose appointed general A. D. Loganathan as the governor of the islands. However, he had limited power while the real control of the islands remained with the Japanese.

There were reports of widespread looting, arson, rape, and extrajudicial killings during the Japanese occupation. The residents were often killed by the Japanese for trivial reasons. The largest incident was the Homfreyganj massacre on 30 January 1944, where 44 local civilians were shot by the Japanese on suspicion of spying. Approximately 2,000 people were reportedly killed in Port Blair during the occupation, which represented ten per cent of the pre-war population of the settlement. Japanese vice admiral Teizo Hara and major general Tamenori Sato surrendered to lieutenant colonel Nathu Singh Rathore, commanding officer of the Rajput Regiment, on 15 August 1945 aboard the Royal Navy ship HMS Rocksand. On 7 October 1945, the territory was officially handed back to British brigadier J. A. Salomons, commander of the 116th Indian Infantry Brigade, and chief administrator Noel Patterson, in a ceremony at the Gymkhana Ground in Port Blair.

=== Post independence ===
During the Partition of India, the British announced their intention to retain possession of the islands and use them to resettle Anglo-Indians and Anglo-Burmese on these islands. The islands were claimed by the Indian National Congress for India and the Muslim League for Pakistan during the partition negotiations. After the Indian Independence in 1947, the islands automatically became part of the Dominion of India. With the adoption of the Constitution of India in 1950, the islands were designated as the only Part D territory and placed under the administration of a lieutenant governor appointed by the Government of India. The islands were later used to resettle Bengalis displaced during the partition with a substantial number of displaced immigrants establishing agricultural colonies. The islands became a separate union territory administered by the Government of India, following the re-organization in 1956. The islands have been developed into a key defence establishment since the 1980s due to its strategic location in the Bay of Bengal across the Strait of Malacca.

On 26 December 2004, the coasts of the Andaman and Nicobar islands experienced 10 m (33 ft) high tsunami waves following an undersea earthquake in the Indian Ocean which resulted in more than 2,000 casualties, 46,000 injuries and rendering at least 40,000 homeless. The locals and tourists on the islands suffered the greatest casualties while the indigenous people largely survived unscathed due to movement to high grounds following the oral traditions passed down over generations that warned them to evacuate following earthquakes.

== Geography ==
Map of Andaman and Nicobar Islands

The territory consists of 836 islands and islets occupying an area of 8,249 km^{2} (3,185 sq mi), of which only 31 are permanently inhabited. The islands extend from 6° to 14° North latitudes and from 92° to 94° East longitudes. The islands are grouped into the north Andaman Islands and south Nicobar Islands, separated by the 150 km (93 mi) wide Ten Degree Channel. The Andamans cover an area of 6,408 km^{2} (2,474 sq mi) while the Nicobar group covers an area of 1,841 km^{2} (711 sq mi). The highest point is the Saddle Peak at 732 m (2,402 ft), located in North Andaman Island.

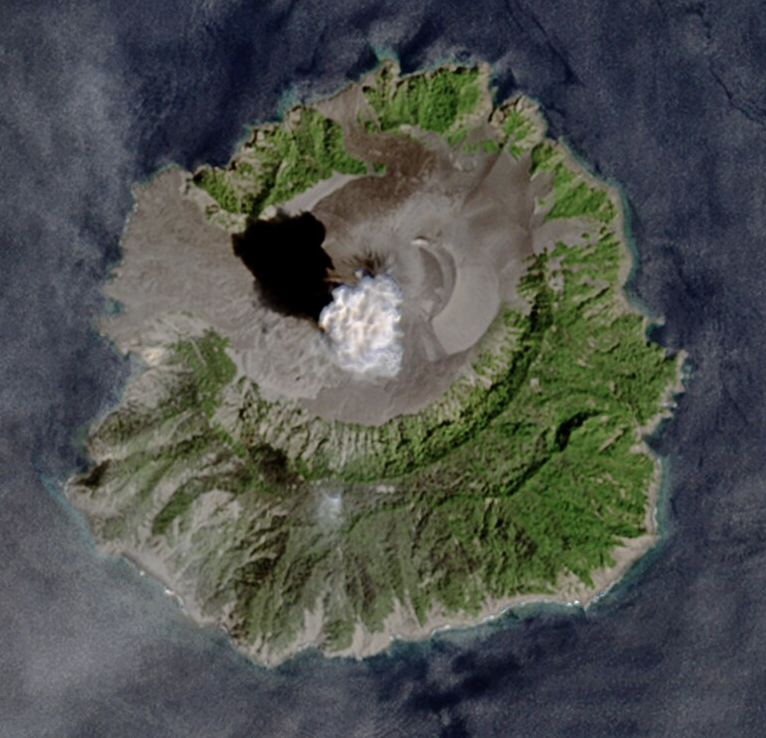
Barren Island, the only active volcano in India

The northernmost point of the islands is 901 km (560 mi) away from the mouth of the Hooghly River in the Indian mainland. The territory shares maritime borders with Indonesia located about 165 km (103 mi) to the south, Myanmar located 280 km (170 mi) to the north-east and Thailand located 650 km (400 mi) to the south-east. Indira Point, the southernmost point of India, is located at 6°45'10″N and 93°49'36″E at the southern tip of Great Nicobar. The capital and largest city is Port Blair (officially Sri Vijaya Puram), located 1,190 km (740 mi) from Chennai and 1,255 km (780 mi) from Kolkata on the Indian mainland. Barren Island, the only active volcano in India, is located in the Andaman Sea.

The islands have a 1,962 km (1,219 mi) long coast-line. The topography of the territory varies significantly across various islands. The islands may have sandy, rocky sandstone or marshy beaches on the coastlines and might be surrounded by shoals and coral reefs. The altitude varies significantly from completely flat islands to gradually raising topography from the coast to the interior in larger islands. The islands are generally surrounded by shallow seas of varying depths in the vicinity with some deep natural bays occurring along certain coasts. The islands have a moderate temperature around the year with the average ranging from 23 to 31 °C (73 to 88 °F). The islands have a tropical climate with warm summers and not so chill winters. The rainfall is dependent on the monsoons and tropical cyclones are common in late summer.

=== Flora and fauna ===
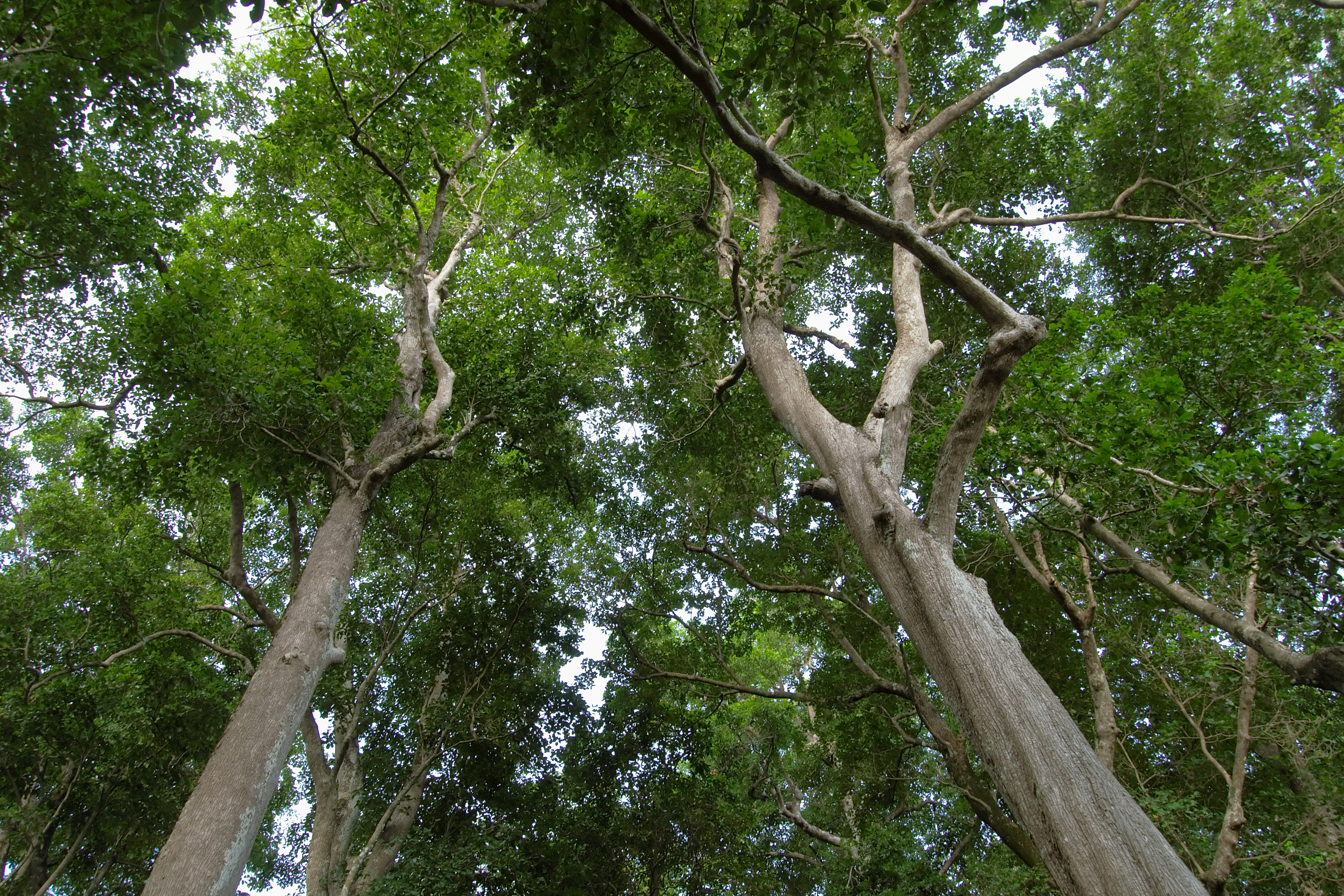
Tropical evergreen forests in the interior of the islands

The islands have mangroves interspersed with marshes, coconut trees or dispersed bushy vegetation along the coast. There are twelve types of forests that occur in the islands including evergreen, deciduous, mangrove, littoral, bamboo, sub-montane and brackish water forests. North Andaman is characterised by wet evergreen forests with climbing plants, Middle Andaman has moist deciduous forests and South Andaman islands have epiphytic vegetation, mostly ferns and orchids. The North Nicobar islands are mostly barren with grasslands while evergreen forests form the dominant vegetation in the central and southern islands of the Nicobar group. The forest coverage is estimated to be 86.2% of the total land area with about 2,200 varieties of plants of which 200 are endemic and 1,300 do not occur in mainland India. There are more than 200 species used for timber.

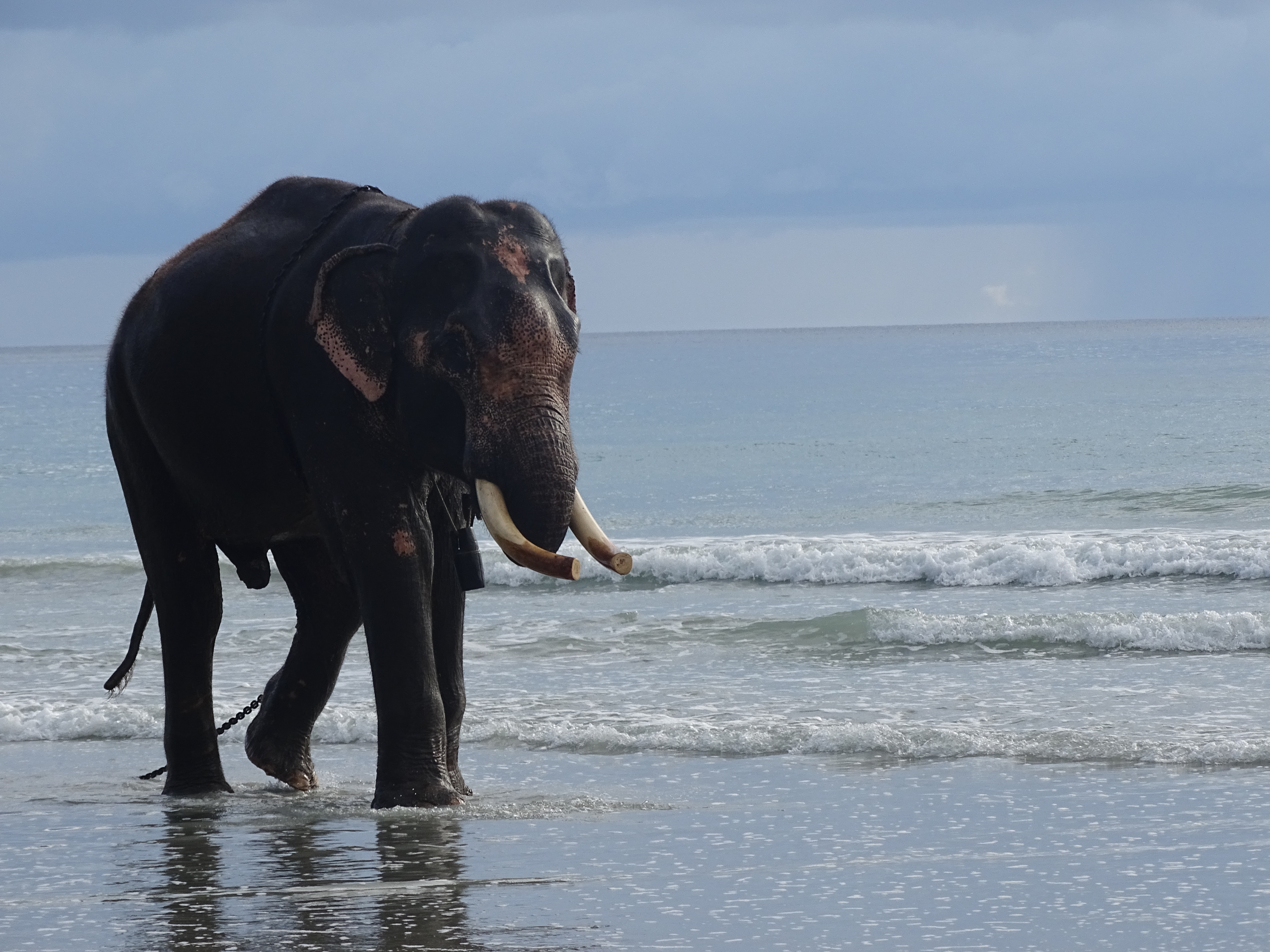
Indian elephants were introduced in the islands during the 19th century to move timber.

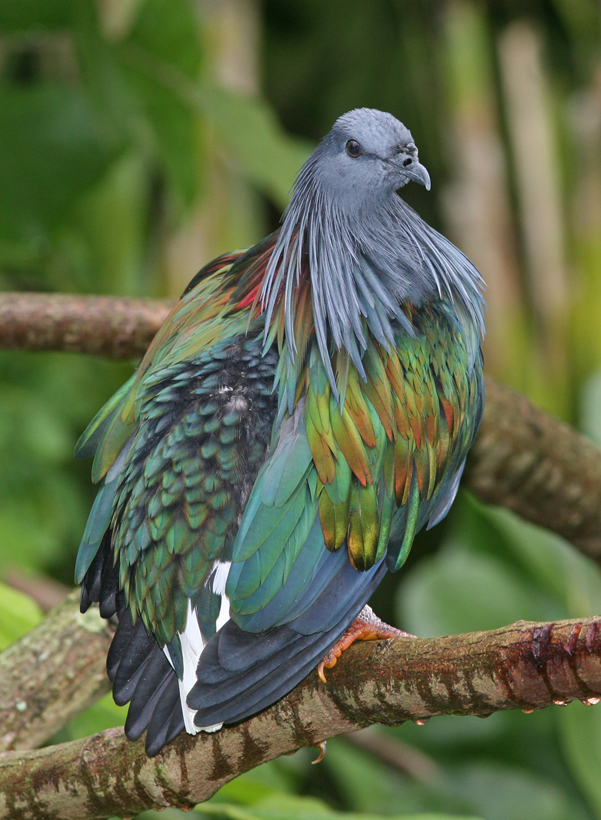
Nicobar pigeon, the closest living relative to the extinct Dodo

There are more than 8300 species of fauna of which 1117 are endemic to the islands. Most of the larger species were introduced by colonists and travellers, some of which became endemic due to their prolonged isolation. There are about 55 mammal species of which 32 are endemic with 26 species of rats and 14 species of bats, the most among the mammals. The endangered Indian elephant can be found in forested or mountainous areas of the islands, which were originally introduced from the mainland to help with the timber extraction in 1883. Endangered and critically endangered species endemic to the islands include the Andaman white-toothed shrew, Andaman spiny shrew, Jenkin's shrew, Nicobar spiny shrew, Nicobar tree shrew, Miller's Nicobar rat, palm rat, Andaman teal, Nicobar scops owl, Andaman boobook, and Darwin's eastern frog. Other large fauna include wild boar, spotted deer, barking deer and sambar deer. There are about 270 species of birds in the islands of which 90 are endemic. The islands' caves are nesting grounds for the edible-nest swiftlet, whose nests are prized for bird's nest soup. The islands serve as an intermediate resting site for birds such as Horsfield's bronze cuckoo, Zappey's flycatcher and Javan pond heron during long distance migrations. The Nicobar pigeon found in the islands is the closest living relative to the extinct dodo.

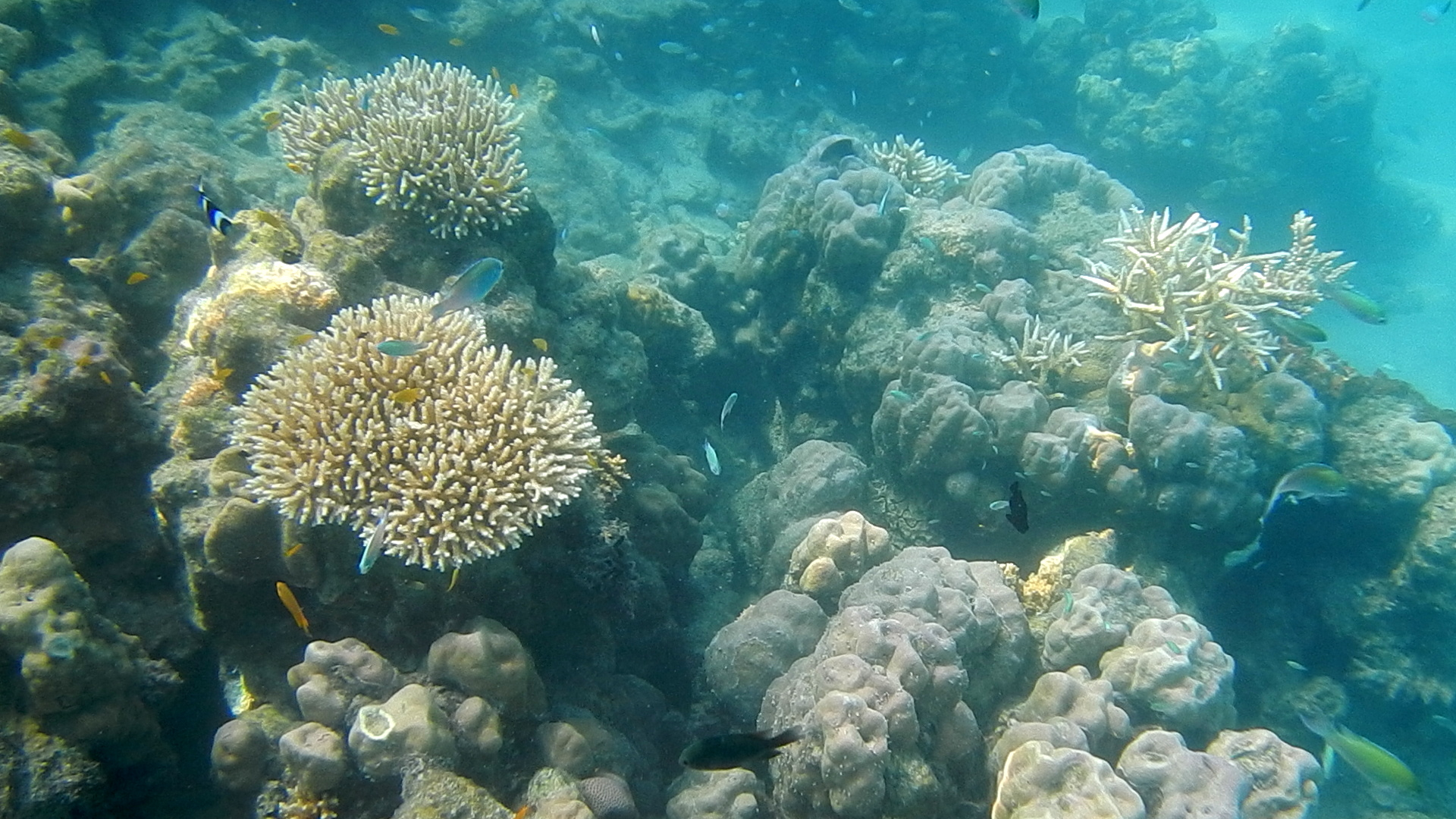
Corals around the Havelock Island

There are about 64 species of reptiles of which half of them are endemic to the islands. More than 1350 species of echinoderms and molluscs and 200 species of corals are found in the seas surrounding the islands. Larger marine species include salt water crocodiles, dugongs, turtles, dolphins and whales. There are more than 1350 species of fishes including 13 fresh water species. The islands are well known for prized shellfish, the commercial exploitation of which began in the early 20th century. The territory is home for about 896 species of winged insects including 225 butterfly species.

There are about nine national parks, 96 wildlife sanctuaries and one biosphere reserve in the islands. The Andaman regional centre of the Zoological Survey of India was established in 1977. The Mahatma Gandhi Marine National Park was established in 1983 and consists of 15 islands in South Andaman.

Official symbols of Andaman and Nicobar
Animal	Dugong (Dugong dugon)	Bird	Andaman wood pigeon (Columba palumboides)
Tree	Andaman padauk (Pterocarpus dalbergioides)	Flower	Pyinma (Lagerstroemia hypoleuca)

== Demographics ==
Historical population
Year	Pop.	±%
1901	24,649	—
1911	26,459	+7.3%
1921	27,086	+2.4%
1931	29,463	+8.8%
1941	33,768	+14.6%
1951	30,971	−8.3%
1961	63,548	+105.2%
1971	115,133	+81.2%
1981	188,741	+63.9%
1991	280,661	+48.7%
2001	356,152	+26.9%
2011	380,581	+6.9%
2019	434,192 (Note: Projected)	+14.1%
Source: Census of India

As per the 2011 census of India, the population of Andaman and Nicobar islands was 380,581, of which 202,871 (53.3%) were males and 177,710 (46.7%) were females. The sex ratio was 878 females per 1,000 males. There were a total of 94,551 households and about 143,488 (37.7%) of the population lived in urban areas. Hinduism (69.5%) is the major religion of people of the Andaman and Nicobar Islands followed by Christianity (21.7%) and Islam (8.5%).

Religion in Andaman and Nicobar (2011)
Religion	Percent
Hinduism	69.45%
Christianity	21.28%
Islam	8.52%
Others	0.75%

The Andaman islands were populated by the indigenous people (the Great Andamanese, the Onge, the Jarawa and the Sentinelese) who were isolated and spoke Andamanese languages for thousands of years. The Nicobar islands, which was part of trade routes and was frequented by travellers, were populated by Shompen people before the islands were settled by Nicobarese people, who spoke Austroasiatic languages. The islands include the North Sentinel Island, home to the Sentinelese people, among the only known uncontacted tribes in India. When the islands were first colonised, the population of the natives were estimated to be around 5,000 and while the population of islands temporarily increased during colonisation, the population saw a massive spike post-1960s due to the policies of the Union Government that encouraged settlers from other parts of the country. In the early 21st century, the population of indigenous people has drastically dropped. As of 2016, it was estimated to consist of 44 Great Andamanese, 380 Jarawas, 101 Onges, 15 Sentinelese and 229 Shompens. The Government of India is trying to protect the remnant population by providing access to healthcare facilities, communication and social engagement.

Distribution of languages in Andaman and Nicobar (2011)
Language	Percent
Bengali	28.49%
Tamil	15.20%
Telugu	13.24%
Hindi	12.91%
Nicobarese	7.60%
Malayalam	7.22%
Nagpuri	5.53%
Kurukh	3.96%
Others	5.84%

=== Languages ===
The Andamanese people speak about a dozen endangered Andamanese languages, which belong to two families, Great Andamanese and Ongan that are unrelated to each other or to any other language group. There are two unattested languages: Sentinelese, spoken by Sentinelese people, who refuse contact with outsiders, which might be related to Ongan as per Anvita Abbi and Jangil, which became extinct in the 1920s. Indigenous to the Nicobar Islands are the Shompen language, spoken by Shompen people and the five Nicobarese languages, which form part of the Austroasiatic language family and are spoken by about 29,000 people or 7.6% of the population.

The majority of the population, however, are speakers of immigrant languages which include Bengali (28.5%), Tamil (15.2%), Telugu (13.2%), Hindi (12.9%), Malayalam (7.2%). Sadri (5.5%), and Kurukh (4%). Hindi is the official language of the region, while English is declared an additional official language for communication purposes.

== Administration and politics ==
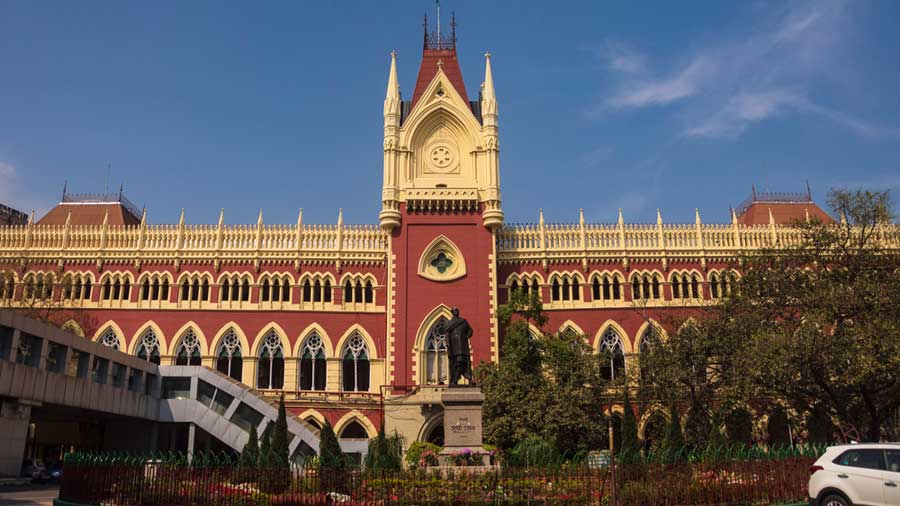
The Calcutta High Court has jurisdiction over the islands, and operates a circuit bench in Port Blair

The islands form a part of the union territory of Andaman and Nicobar Islands and is administered by a Lieutenant Governor on behalf of the Government of India. The union territory was established in 1956 with a chief commissioner as the head of the administration. In 1982, the Lieutenant Governor replaced the Chief Commissioner as the head of administration. In 1981, a "Pradesh council" with councillors as representatives of the people was constituted to advise the Lieutenant Governor. The territory sends one representative to Lok Sabha of the Indian Parliament from its Andaman and Nicobar Islands Lok Sabha constituency. The territory is divided into three districts, each headed by a deputy commissioner. The Calcutta High Court has jurisdiction over the islands with a permanent seat at Port Blair.

Districts of Andaman and Nicobar
District	Capital	Area (km^{2})	Population (2011)	Tehsils
North and Middle Andaman	Mayabunder	3,302	105,597	Diglipur, Mayabunder, Rangat
South Andaman	Port Blair	3,106	238,142	Port Blair, Ferrargunj, Little Andaman
Nicobar	Car Nicobar	1,841	36,842	Car Nicobar, Nancowry, Great Nicobar

The indigenous communities have their own system of administration. There are long term settlements known as baraij and short-term settlements known as chang. The coast-dwellers (aryoto) have semi-permanent settlements and the interior groups (eremtaga) dwell on temporary settlements, which enable them to migrate during dry seasons.

== Economy ==
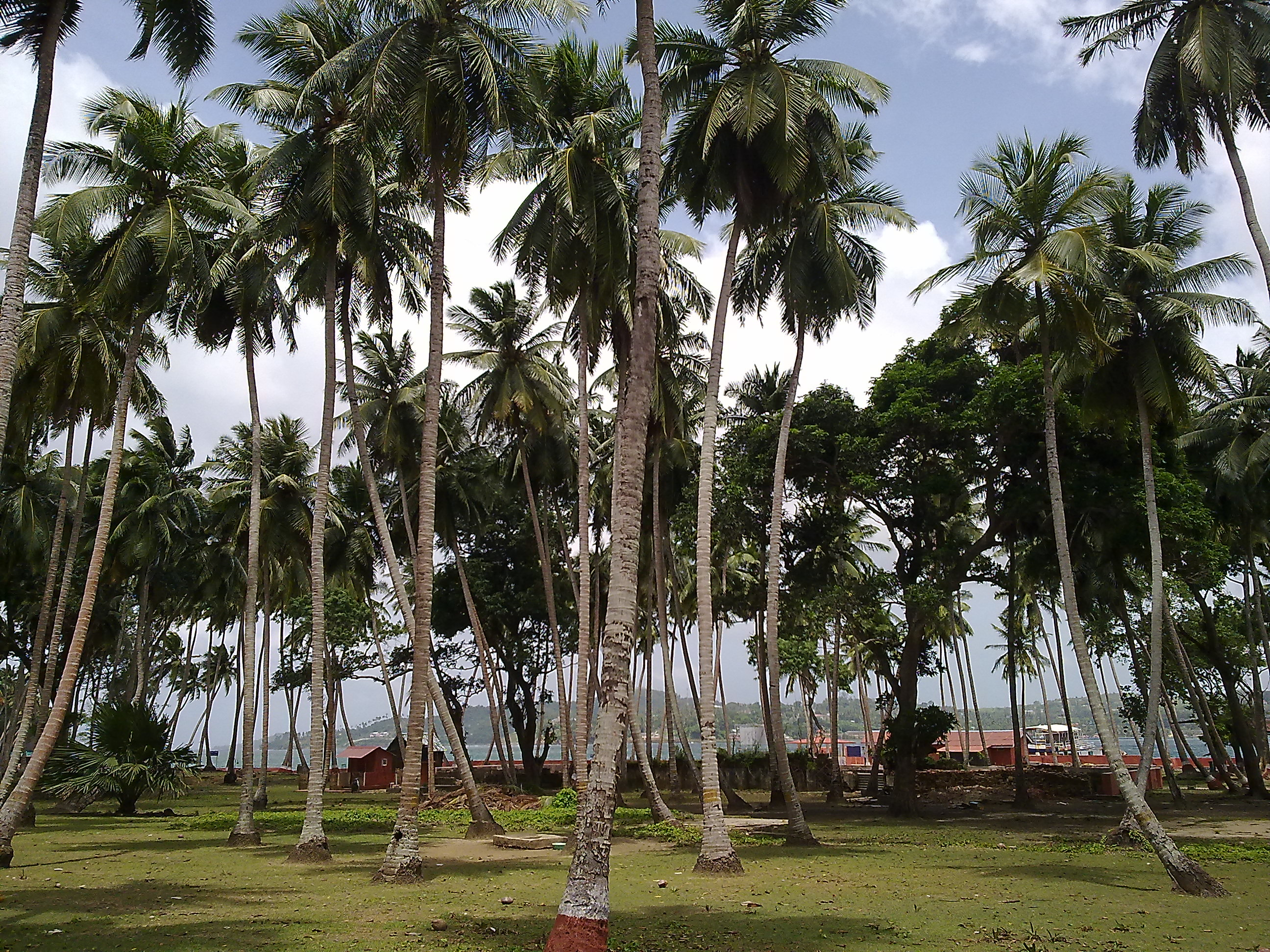
Coconut trees in South Andaman

As of 2022, the GSDP was ₹103 billion (US$1.1 billion). Agriculture is a major occupation with nearly 50% of the population engaged in the sector. Only about 48,675 hectares (120,280 acres) of land, which is about 6% of the total land area, can be used for agriculture. Rice is the main food crop, grown in about 20% of the arable land. Most of the food for consumption is imported from mainland India. Coconut and arecanut are the cash crops grown in the Nicobar islands. Other crops include pulses, oilseeds, vegetables like okra, brinjal, cucurbit and radish; spices and fruits such as mango, sapota, orange, banana, guava and pineapple. Rubber, red oil, palm and cashew are grown on a limited scale in plantations. The territory has an exclusive economic zone of more than 0.6 million sq. km, which contributes to the fishing industry. As of 2017, the region produced 27,526 tonnes of fish, mostly from marine sector with minor contribution from inland fisheries.

As of 2008, there were 1,833 registered small-scale industries with majority being involved in engineering, woodworking and textiles apart from 21 factories. District Industries Centre (DIC) is the body responsible for the development of small and medium industries in the islands. Andaman and Nicobar Islands Integrated Development Corporation Limited (ANIIDCO), established in 1988, is responsible for the development and economic growth of the islands.

=== Tourism ===
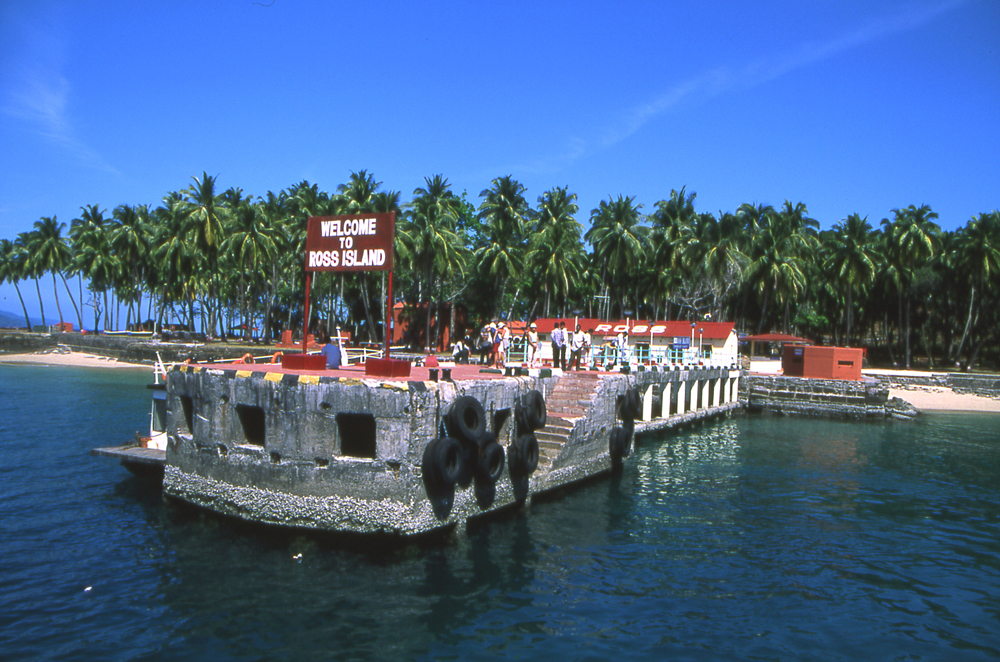
Netaji Subhash Chandra Bose Island in 2004

Tourism is one of the major contributors to the economy of the islands. The islands had more than 400,000 visitors in 2016 with a 94% contribution from domestic tourists. In 2018, plans to develop facilities in various islands under the National Institute of Transforming India (NITI) Aayog was initiated by Government of India, with the aim of increasing tourist inflows. Foreign tourists are issued Restricted Area Permits (RAP) which gives access to specific areas with conditions. While domestic tourists do not require a permit to visit the accessible parts of the islands, the tribal reserves are forbidden and requires special permission for access. The islands have many beaches due to its long coastline and various water sports are practised including kayaking, scuba diving and parasailing.

Major attractions include the Cellular Jail, Chatham Saw Mill, Forest Museum, Samudrika Naval Marine Museum, Anthropological Museum, Fisheries Aquarium, Science Center and Carbyn's cove in Port Blair; Bharatpur, Lakshmanpur and Sitapur beaches in Shaheed Dweep; Elephant and Radhanagar beaches in Swaraj Dweep; Hudi tikri, Red, Bird and Bat islands, Amkunj beach near Rangat; Dhaninallah mangroves and Karmatang beach near Mayabunder; limestone caves and mud volcanoes near Diglipur; Craggy island and Ross & Smith islands and various national parks and protected sanctuaries.

== Transportation ==
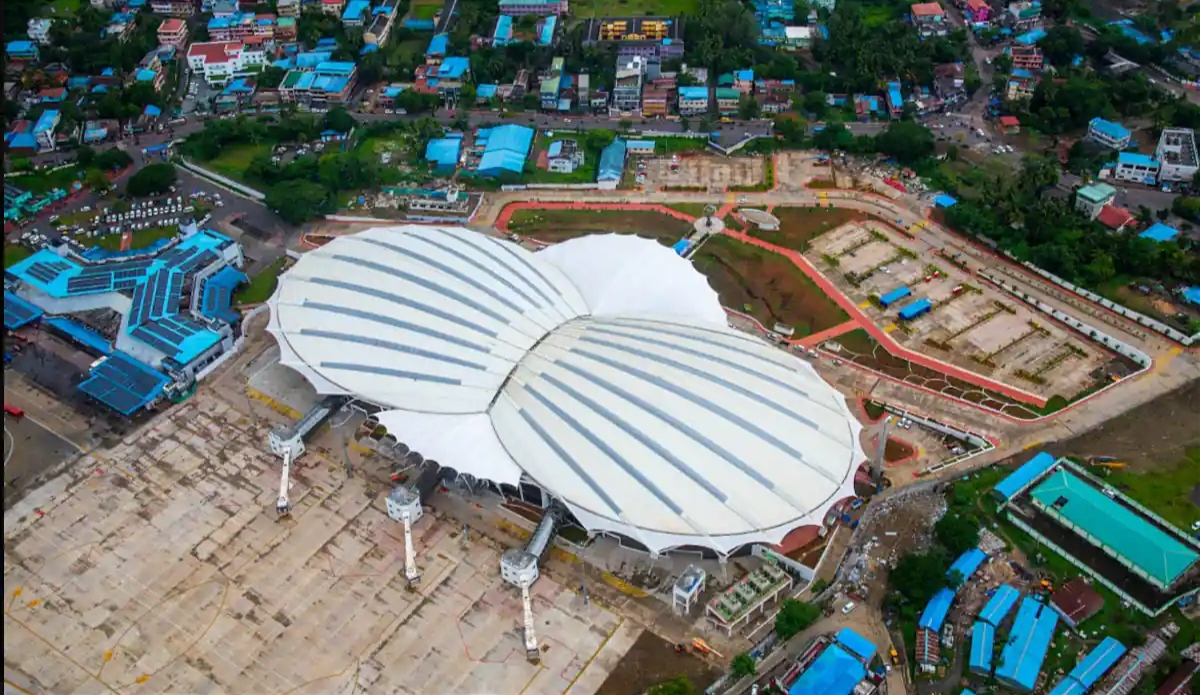
Veer Savarkar International Airport is the only major airport in the islands.

The Andaman and Nicobar is considered strategically important to India due to their location in the Indian Ocean. The islands lie to the southeast of the Bay of Bengal and close to the Strait of Malacca, one of the major maritime routes. Its location helps India monitor maritime traffic in the region and serves as a strategic location for military deployment. The Andaman and Nicobar Command of Indian Armed Forces operates air bases of Car Nicobar AFS, INS Kohassa, INS Utkrosh, and INS Baaz.

The islands are served by Veer Savarkar International Airport near Port Blair which has regular flights to major cities in India. The airport operates as a civil enclave, sharing airside facilities with INS Utkrosh of the Indian Navy. The airport has a single runway of 3,290 m (10,794 ft) in length, with the civilian terminal operated by the Airports Authority of India with air traffic operations managed by the Indian Navy.

There are 23 ports along the islands with a major port at Port Blair and eight other significant ports including Diglipur, Mayabunder, Rangat, Hut Bay, Car Nicobar, Katchal and Campbell Bay. In 2022, the Government of India proposed the development of a new container ship terminal and an airport at Great Nicobar. There are 39 light houses situated across the islands.

As of 2018, there are 422 km (262 mi) long national highways in the state with the major highway being the 230.7 km (143.4 mi) long NH 4 connecting Port Blair and Diglipur.

== Infrastructure ==
=== Power ===
There is no single power grid connecting all the islands and independent power houses caters to the power requirements of individual islands. The islands have an installed power capacity of 68.46 MW with majority of the power generated from diesel power plants and a single hydroelectric powerplant of 5.25 MW on Kalpong river. In 2016, a new 15 MW diesel power plant was established in South Andaman with Japanese assistance. Commissioned in June 2020, a 10 MW photovoltaic power station is operated by NLC India in Port Blair. In 2022, the government proposed additional power plants and infrastructure to be developed in Great Nicobar.

=== Telecommunication ===
4G mobile service is provided by various telecom operators in the islands. Until 2020, Internet was provided through satellite links and access was limited. Bharat Broadband Network started work on laying fiber optic submarine cables connecting the islands with Chennai in December 2018. On 10 August 2020, the undersea optical fibre cable went live, which enabled high-speed broadband connections in the islands.

== Education ==
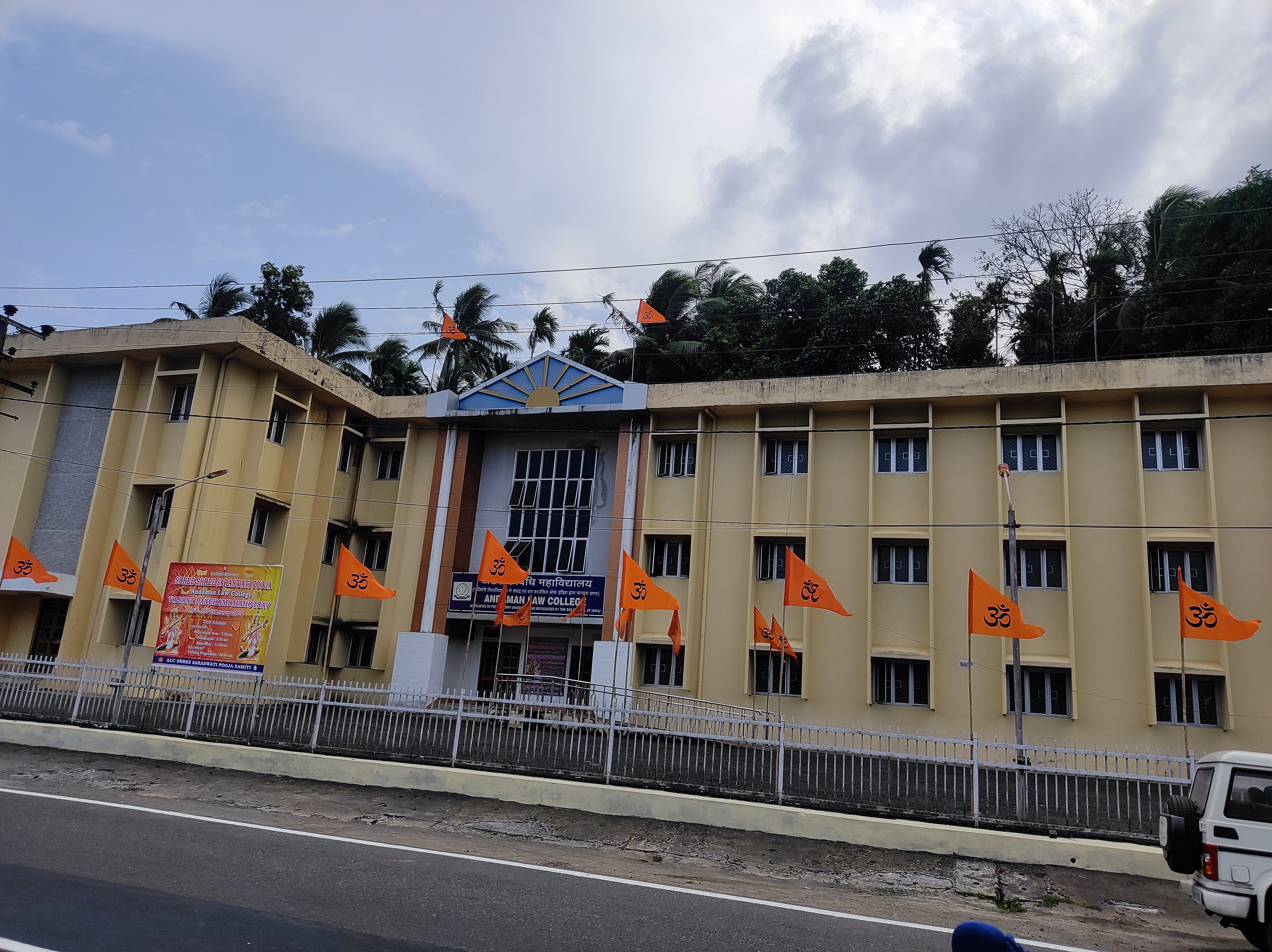
Andaman Law College

The first primary school in the islands was established in 1881. During Independence, 12 schools were functioning on the islands including one high school. As of 2023, there are 428 schools functioning in the islands with a total enrolment of 86,081 students.

The Andaman and Nicobar Islands Institute of Medical Sciences was established in 1963. The Jawaharlal Nehru Rajkeeya Mahavidyalaya was established later in 1967. Dr. B. R. Ambedkar Government Polytechnic was established in 1984 and the affiliated engineering college, Dr. B. R. Ambedkar Institute of Technology was established in 1989. The Mahatma Gandhi Government College was established in 1990 and is affiliated to Pondicherry University. The Andaman Law College is the only law college in the state, and was established in 2016.

== In popular culture ==
- Arthur Conan Doyle refers to the Andaman islands in the Sherlock Holmes novel The Sign of the Four.
- Bengali author Sunil Gangopadhyay based the events of one his Kakababu series of adventure thriller novels, Sabuj Dwiper Raja (1976), on the islands. In 1979, it was made into a film of the same name, shot extensively on the islands.
- The National Award-winning Malayalam film Kaalapani was set against the backdrop of Port Blair's Cellular Jail and was extensively shot in the islands.
- The Netflix Original Series Kaala Paani is based on a fictional illness that spreads in the islands.
- Hitman 3 features a fictional island in Nicobar called Ambrose island that was added as a new map in a free update to the game, and is home to a group of pirates operating in the Strait of Malacca.

== See also ==
- Coral reefs in India
- Lakshadweep
- List of islands of India
