= Yeshwantrao =

Yeshwantrao is a name. People with the name include:

== Given name ==
- Yeshwantrao Ghorpade
- Yeshwantrao Ghatge
- Yeshwantrao Chavan
- Yeshwantrao Holkar II

== Middle name ==
- Murarirao Yeshwantrao Ghorpade

== Other ==
- Maharaja Yeshwantrao Hospital

== See also ==
- Yashwantrao
