= Hindu YUVA =

North American student organization

Hindu YUVA (Youth for Unity, Virtues and Action) is an American college campus-based organization operated under the umbrella of the Hindu Swayamsevak Sangh (HSS). It is aligned with the politics of Hindutva.

== History ==
The Hindu YUVA was founded in 2006-7, by the HSS, the overseas branch of the Rashtriya Swayamsevak Sangh (RSS). The Hindu YUVA continues to operated under the HSS as part of the Sangh Parivar. Scholars consider the Hindu YUVA to "advocate basic Hindutva ideas, especially concerning Hindu identity in what is sometimes described as soft Hindutva". The Hindu YUVA seeks to recruit students for leadership roles in national American Hindutva groups.

== Activities ==
Hindu YUVA branches offer support for Hindu students on American college campuses, including celebrating Hindu holidays and helping international students transition to life in America. Still, their "social and cultural opportunities for students of common ethnic, religious, or cultural backgrounds" is complicated by "their ties with Hindu right-wing groups."

== Controversies ==
The Hindu YUVA has been involved in numerous controversies. In the early 2020s, a graduate student group asked Northwestern University to cease funding the Hindu YUVA because of the YUVA's links with violent Hindu nationalist organizations in India, like the RSS. As of 2023, the controversy was ongoing.

In 2025, the Hindu YUVA branch at the University of Texas at Dallas hosted a speaker known for whitewashing K. B. Hedgewar, an Indian fascist leader and key RSS ideologue. Professors, students, and civil rights groups condemned the event. Later in 2025, the Hindu YUVA chapter at the University of California-Davis cancelled an event with the same speaker after facing backlash from Sikh and Muslim student groups.

The Hindu YUVA has been accused more generally of "participat[ing] in assaults on higher education and individual scholars" led by national Hindutva groups. One example is harassment of a Rutgers University professor in 2017.

== See Also ==
- Akhil Bharatiya Vidyarthi Parishad
- Hindu Students Council
- National Hindu Students' Forum
