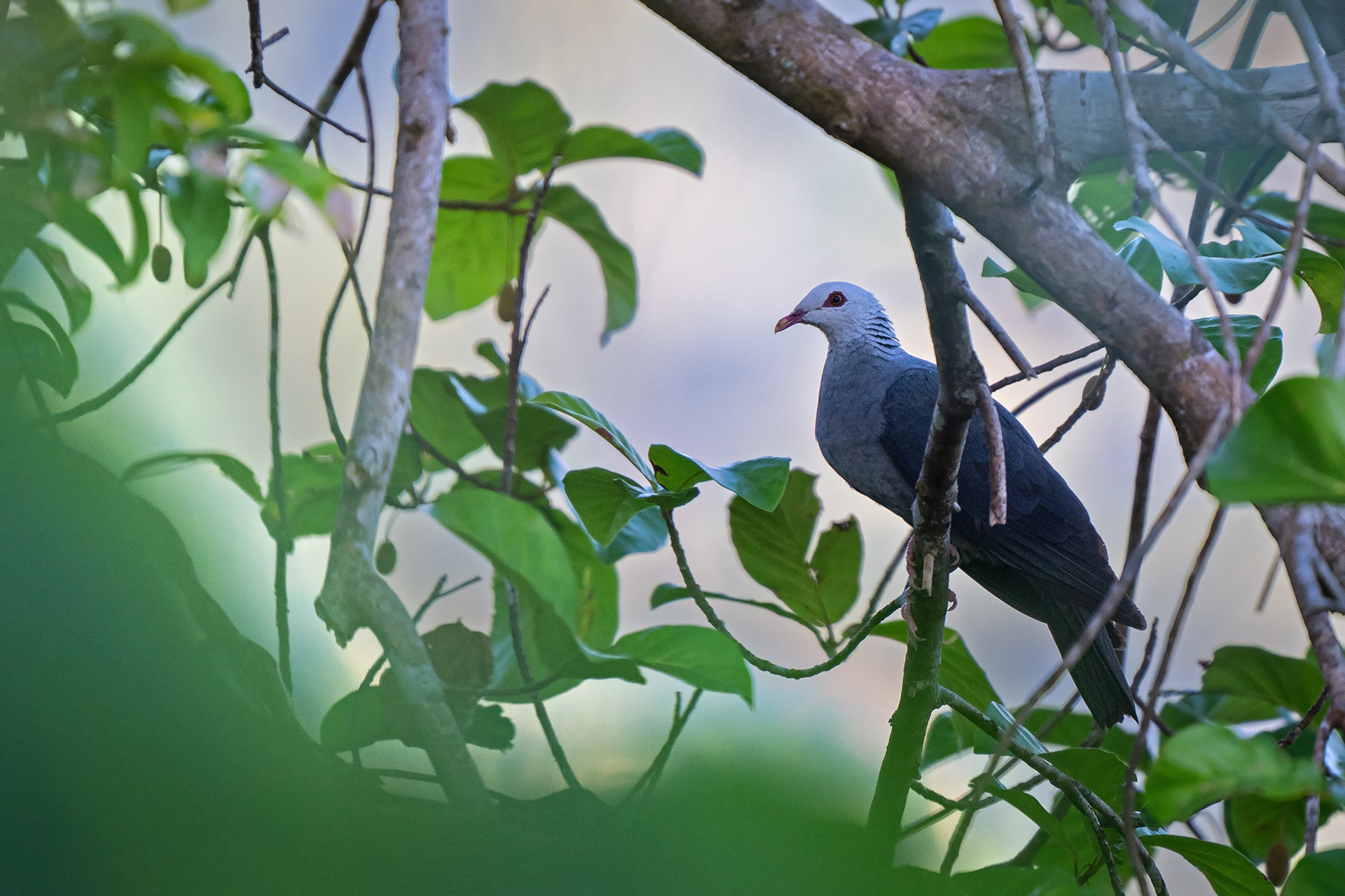
- Andaman wood pigeon from Mount Harriet National Park
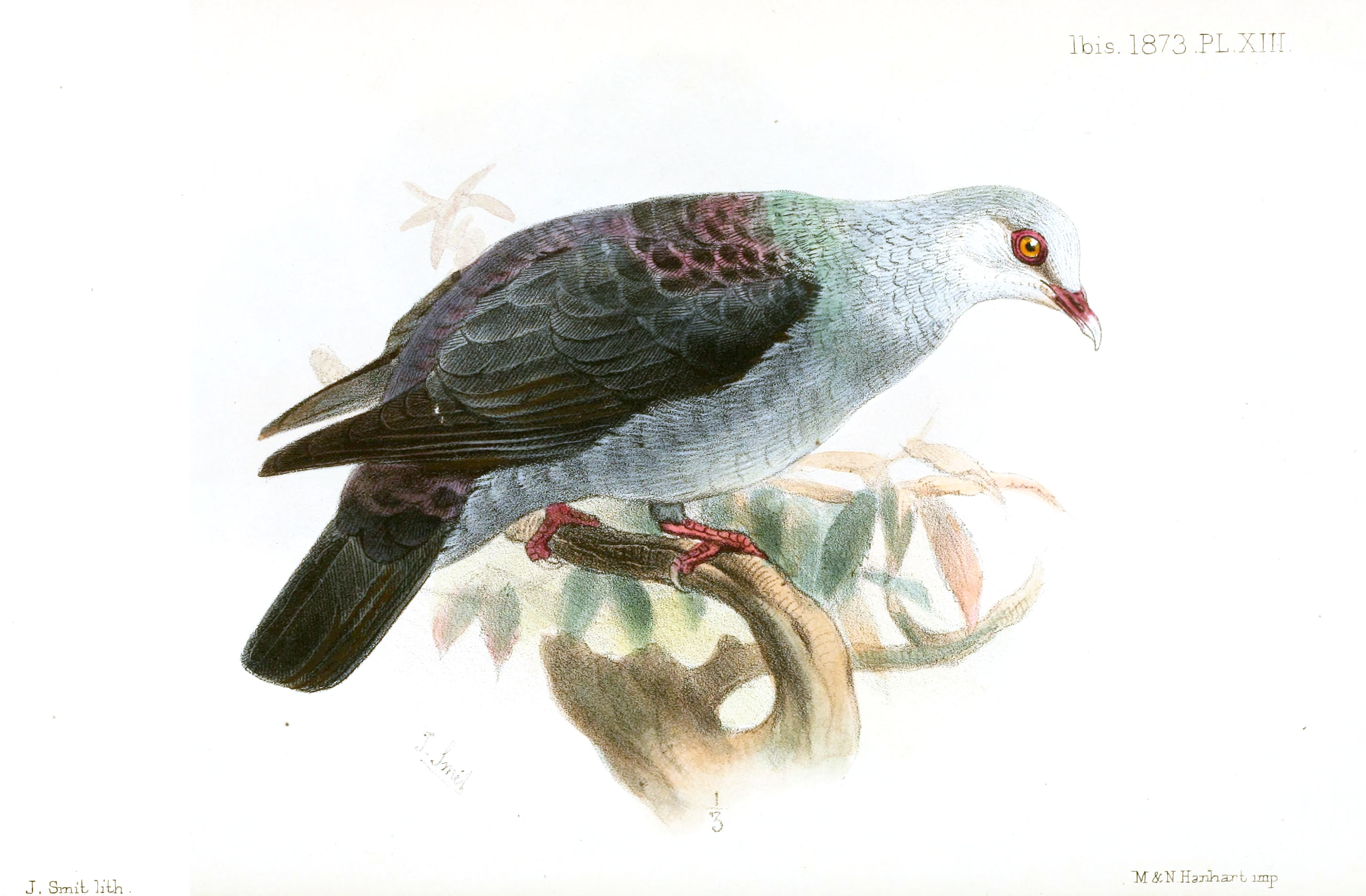

Conservation status
- Near Threatened (IUCN 3.1)

Scientific classification
- Kingdom: Animalia
- Phylum: Chordata
- Class: Aves
- Order: Columbiformes
- Family: Columbidae
- Genus: Columba
- Species: C. palumboides

Binomial name
- Columba palumboides (Hume, 1873)

= Andaman wood pigeon =

Species of bird

The Andaman wood pigeon (Columba palumboides) is a species of bird in the family Columbidae. It is endemic to the Andaman and Nicobar Islands in India. Classified as 'near threatened' by the IUCN, its population is estimated as between 2,500 and 10,000 mature individuals.

== Description ==
Its head is white with a red yellow-tipped beak with red claws. The rest of its body is black. It is related to the green imperial pigeon and the rock dove. It can mostly be found on North Passage Island.
