= Bengalis in the Andaman and Nicobar Islands =

আন্দামান ও নিকোবর দ্বীপপুঞ্জের বাঙালিরা Āndāmān o Nikôbār dwīppuñjēr bāṅgālirā
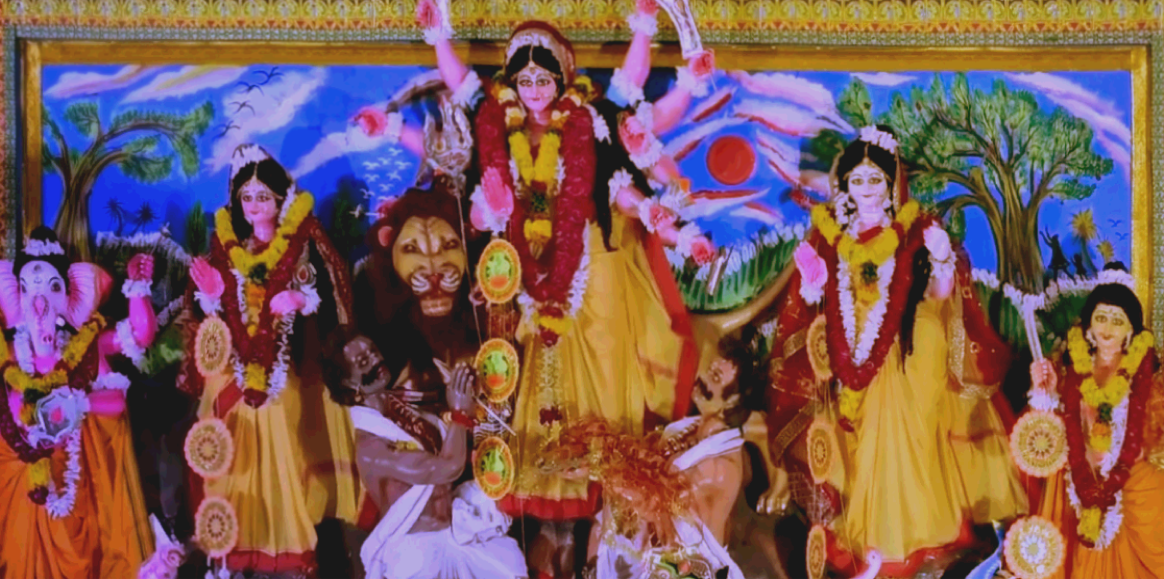
- Durga Puja pandal at Port Blair

Total population
- 108,432 (2011) (26% of the union territory's population)

Languages
- Bengali (Eastern dialects)

Religion
- Predominantly Hinduism (Vaishnavism)

Related ethnic groups
- Bengali diaspora

Bengalis are the largest ethnic group in the Andaman and Nicobar Islands, comprising 26% of the union territory's total population.

== History ==
The modern history of Bengali settlement in the islands began after the Partition of India in 1947, when many Bengali refugees from East Bengal (now Bangladesh), particularly from the districts of Khulna, Jessore, Bakerganj (now Barisal) and Faridpur, were resettled in the Andaman Islands.

On 14 March 1949, a group of 495 East Bengali refugees arrived at Kidderpore Dock in Kolkata from the transit camp at Andul, where they had been gathered from several hastily established refugee camps across West Bengal. The group consisted of 132 families, including 50 agricultural families, 22 tāṃtī (weaver) families and 34 sūtradhara (carpenter) families. They became the first group of refugees to be resettled in the Andaman Islands. According to Anandabazar Patrika (15 March 1949), they represented only a small fraction of the approximately 70,000 refugees awaiting rehabilitation in West Bengal. Their departure was described by West Bengal's Chief Minister Dr Bidhan Chandra Roy as a historic event. Accompanied by Relief Minister Nikunjabihari Maity, Roy personally attended their departure from Kolkata, presenting the occasion as a significant milestone in the government's rehabilitation programme. In a speech delivered before their departure, Roy remarked on the willingness of so many refugees to migrate to what was then perceived as a distant and unfamiliar land.

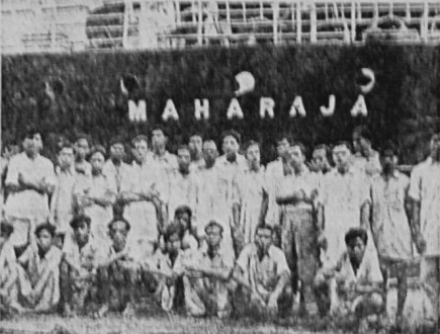
Bengali refugees heading to the Andaman and Nicobar Islands, photographed on 27 May 1950

A second phase began in 1952, when the Government of India introduced the Colonisation and Development Scheme. This programme offered loans and land grants to agriculturists and aimed to develop forested land in the islands for cultivation. Although the scheme was nominally open to settlers from the mainland, the great majority of those who drove it forward were Bengali refugees.

A third and final phase began in 1962 after the Colonisation and Development Scheme was discontinued. In the decade that followed, nearly 700 refugee families were settled through two one-off measures. Across the period from 1949 to 1970, the result was the transformation of a small refugee population into a durable settler society. Many Bengali settlers came from poor, rural and low-caste East Bengali backgrounds, especially Namaḥśūdra "chhoṭolok" families.

The table below shows the recorded migration and settlement of Bengalis in the Andaman and Nicobar Islands based on official reports, census data and scholarly sources.

Bengali migration / settlement in Andaman and Nicobar Islands
| Year | Numbers |
|---|---|
| 1949 | 495 |
| 1952 | 21 families |
| 1953 | 97 families |
| 1954 | 438 families |
| 1955 | 390 families |
| 1956 | 357 families |
| 1957 | 221 families |
| 1958 | 194 families |
| 1959 | 217 families |
| 1960 | 250 families |
| 1961 | 228 families |
| 1967 | 323 families |
| 1969 | 375 families |
| 1971 | 28,092 (approx.) |
| 1991 | 64,706 |
| 2001 | 91,582 |
| 2011 (latest official census) | 108,432 |

Displaced families settled in the Andaman and Nicobar Islands, 1953-1971
| Year | State of Origin | Number of Families | Area of Settlement | Region of Settlement |
|---|---|---|---|---|
| 1953 | East Bengal | 97 | Ferrargunj | South Andamans |
| 1954 | East Bengal | 438 | Rangat | Middle Andamans |
| 1954 | Kerala | 35 | Rangat (Betapur) | Middle Andamans |
| 1955 | East Bengal | 390 | Ferrargunj & Rangat | South and Middle Andamans |
| 1955 | Kerala | 37 | Rangat | Middle Andamans |
| 1955 | Tamil Nadu | 4 | Rangat | Middle Andamans |
| 1956 | East Bengal | 357 | Diglipur | North Andamans |
| 1956 | Kerala | 52 | Diglipur | North Andamans |
| 1957 | East Bengal | 221 | Diglipur | North Andamans |
| 1957 | Pondicherry | 4 | Rangat (Betapur) | Middle Andamans |
| 1958 | East Bengal | 194 | Mayabunder | North Andamans |
| 1958 | Kerala | 6 | Ferrargunj | South Andamans |
| 1959 | East Bengal | 217 | Mayabunder | North Andamans |
| 1959 | Tamil Nadu | 14 | Diglipur | North Andamans |
| 1959 | Bihar | 120 | Rangat (Baratang) | Middle Andamans |
| 1960 | East Bengal | 250 | Mayabunder | North Andamans |
| 1960 | Tamil Nadu | 17 | Diglipur (Milangram) | North Andamans |
| 1960 | Bihar | 64 | Diglipur (Ramnagar) | North Andamans |
| 1961 | East Bengal | 228 | Port Blair (Havelock) | South Andamans |
| 1961 | Kerala | 14 | Port Blair | South Andamans |
| 1961 | Bihar | 13 | Diglipur | North Andamans |
| 1967 | East Bengal | 323 | Mayabunder (Billiground) | North Andamans |
| 1969- 1971 | East Bengal | 375 | Little Andamans | Little Andamans |

=== Settlement and distribution ===
Bengali settlement is concentrated overwhelmingly in the Great Andaman region, especially South Andaman and North and Middle Andaman. The first phase of refugee resettlement placed people entirely in South Andaman, and later agricultural colonisation expanded settlement into other parts of the Great Andaman zone.

== Occupation and economy ==
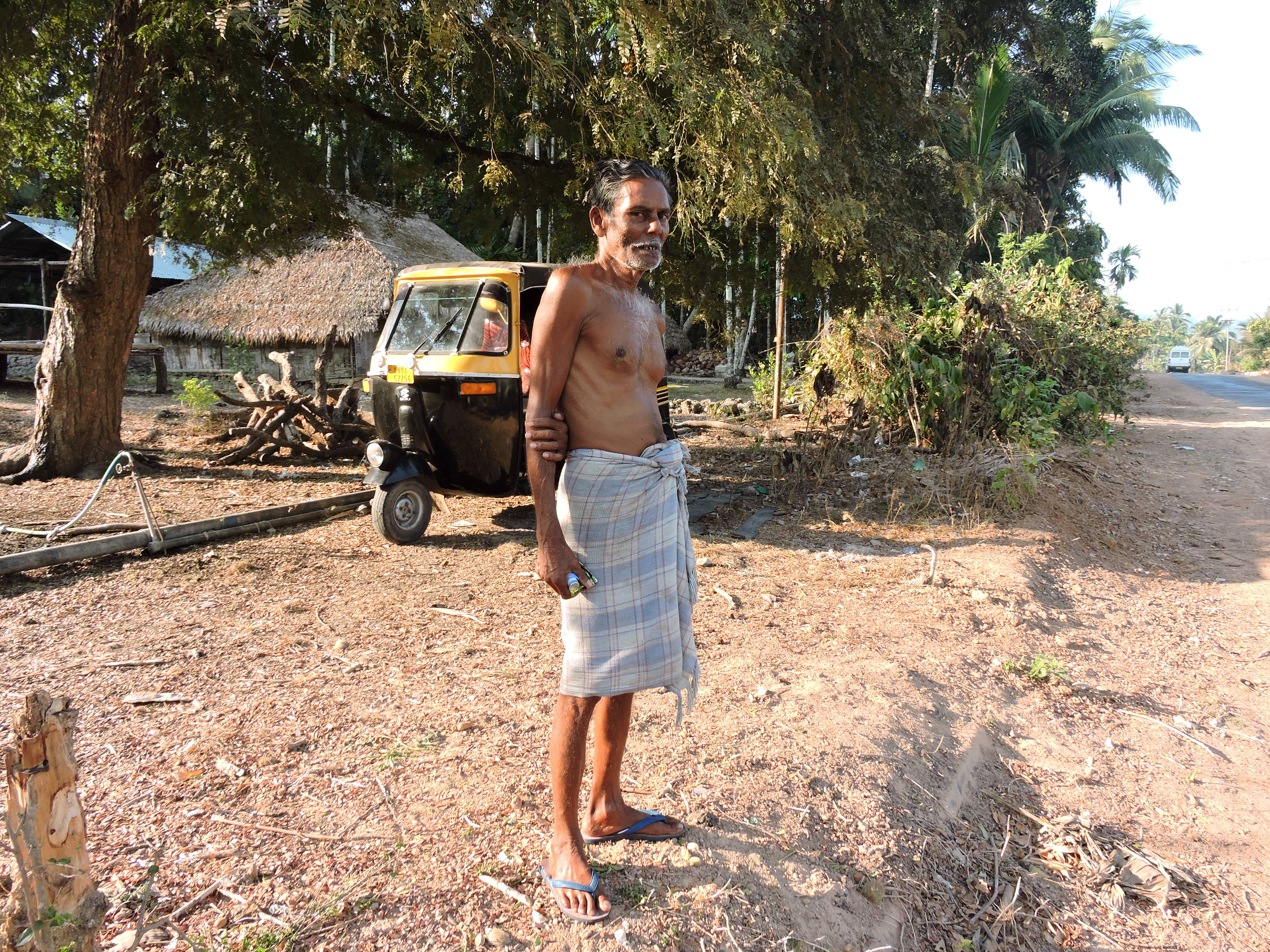
Bengali farmer on Havelock Island in the Andaman Islands

The Bengali settler economy in the islands is rooted mainly in agriculture. The post-Partition rehabilitation schemes were explicitly designed to place Bengali refugees on land and turn them into cultivators, and the settlement programme selected families with able-bodied workers who could clear and cultivate forest land.

Between 1952 and 1961, Bengali refugees accounted for more than 85 per cent of the agricultural settlers rehabilitated in the Andaman Islands. Although not officially designated as such, this period marked the peak of refugee resettlement in the islands. Following a brief decline, smaller resettlement schemes continued between 1965 and 1970, but none approached the scale of the earlier programme. During the 1952 to 1961 period, at least 52 new villages were established across the Andaman Islands, often at the expense of the indigenous tribal communities, particularly the Jarawas. Despite the scale of these settlement efforts, official reports and public propaganda concerning refugee rehabilitation in the Andaman Islands declined significantly during this period.

Many Bengali villagers living in the Andaman and Nicobar islands are farmers, vegetable sellers, fishermen, conch-shell divers, deer and wild pig hunters and itinerant singers, with only a smaller share in salaried government jobs.

== Culture ==
A major part of Bengali identity in the islands is linked to the Matuyā tradition and related low-caste Vaiṣṇava devotional practices from East Bengal. In the islands, it provides a language of equality, devotion and collective memory that helps people anchor themselves in a new homeland.

The form of Bengali culture commonly associated with the works of Rabindranath Tagore is rooted in the Hindu bhadralok tradition, a cultural framework that has had comparatively limited influence among Bengalis in the Andaman and Nicobar Islands. Most Andaman Bengalis are of Namaḥśūdra origin. Many were resettled in the islands following the Partition of India and subsequent displacement from East Bengal. Historically, sections of the community placed greater emphasis on their distinct social and religious traditions than on a broader Hindu identity. Many adherents of the Matua movement continue to interpret their beliefs through anti-caste, anti-Brahmanical and in some cases, Buddhist-influenced perspectives.

A large proportion of the Bengali community in the islands identifies with the Matuyā religious movement (Matuyā panthī). The word matuyā means "intoxicated" or "absorbed in devotional love". The movement originated in the first half of the 19th century in the Faridpur district of East Bengal (now Bangladesh). Influenced by earlier Tantric Vaishnava traditions, it emphasises social equality and emerged primarily among members of the Namaḥśūdra community, who were historically regarded as an "untouchable" caste. It developed in opposition to caste discrimination within the Brahmanical social order and shares elements with other Bengali religious traditions, including the bāul, kirān, mātām, baiṭhak panthī and kīrtan traditions.

The Partition of India in 1947 and the creation of East Pakistan displaced much of the Matua population of East Bengal. Following resettlement in the Andaman and Nicobar Islands, music and oral traditions became important means of preserving community identity. Singing gatherings (gāner āsar), devotional songs and dance continue to play a central role in Matua religious and cultural life.

== Social and political status ==
In 2005, Bengali settlers were given OBC status in the Union Territory's reservation policies. Many settlers interpreted this as a disadvantage because the largely rural Bengali community had to share reserved seats in education and government employment with other groups.

Bengali has an established place in territorial schooling. The Nicobar district education page states that education is provided in five media, including Bengali, alongside English, Hindi, Tamil and Telugu.

== See also ==
- Bengalis
- Andaman and Nicobar Islands
