= Hindu Swayamsevak Sangh =

Overseas branch of Rashtriya Swayamsevak Sangh

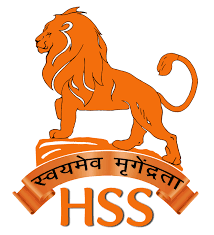
- Abbreviation: HSS
- Formation: 1940
- Region served: Outside India
- Parent organisation: Rashtriya Swayamsevak Sangh
- Affiliations: Sangh Parivar
- Website: Official website

Hindu Swayamsevak Sangh (HSS) is the overseas branch of the Rashtriya Swayamsevak Sangh (RSS), an Indian paramilitary Hindutva organization. It was founded in 1940s in Kenya and since has expanded to at least 156 countries and estimated 3289 branches. The HSS remains aligned with the RSS's Hindutva politics.

== History ==
The HSS was first established in Kenya in the 1940s. Since the group was not on 'national' (rashtriya) soil, they were renamed it as the Bharatiya Swayamsevak Sangh, later Hindu Swayamsevak Sangh (HSS). RSS leader Bhaurao Deoras and others spent several years abroad to develop the organisation, and RSS members have often been directly involved in establishing new HSS branches. The HSS was established in 1966 in the United Kingdom, in cities like Birmingham and Bradford. In North America, the HSS gave the lead to the sister organisation Vishwa Hindu Parishad (VHP, World Hindu Council), which was founded in Canada in 1970 and in the United States in 1971. The HSS followed in its wake.

During the Emergency in 1975-77, the RSS was banned in India and, consequently, sent its organisers abroad and relied on the leadership of the HSS.

The HSS replicates the RSS's structure abroad, including the use of shakhas (branches) and using Hindu temples as a "logistic base". The HSS has also founded additional Hindu nationalist groups outside of India, including Sewa International and the student group Hindu YUVA.

== Activities ==
=== Islamophobia ===
The HSS has been accused of spreading anti-Muslim views in numerous nations. The organization was subjected to investigation in 2015 in the UK after it was caught on camera teaching campers anti-Muslim and anti-Christian views. In the aftermath, the UK Charity Commission called for the HSS and break ties with the RSS. In 2020, an HSS members was removed from a Canadian school board over Islamophobic remarks that brought attention to the HSS's anti-Muslim stances. In 2022, controversy broke out over the appointment of an HSS member to a national faith group in the US, with critics calling attention to the HSS's anti-Muslim views and RSS links.

=== Academic Freedom Attacks ===
The HSS in America participated in calls for universities to pull out of the Dismantling Global Hindutva conference in 2021, along with several other Hindu nationalist groups in the US and India.

=== Children's Programming ===
HSS branches often run children's training programs. The HSS claims these offer Hindu background and spiritual guidance, while critics identify them as "indoctrination" aimed at perpetuating Islamophobia and Hindu supremacy.

=== Yoga ===
The HSS promotes yoga in many contexts, including seeking yoga proclamations from American cities in recent years. Critics argue that they use these proclamations to "whitewash its image as a cover for its nefarious activities". Some cities have revoked the proclamations after learning about the HSS's far-right and overseas ties.

== Australia ==
The HSS organisation in Australia, as elsewhere, says that its focus is on the country in which it is based and that it does not send money to India. It claims to be "ideologically inspired by the RSS vision of a progressive and dynamic Hindu society that can deal with its internal and external challenges, and contribute to the welfare of the whole world". Aside from providing links to the Rashtriya Swayamsevak Sangh (RSS), they also have links with organisations such as the Vishwa Hindu Parishad and the Hindu Youth Network. The aim is to raise awareness in matters relating to Hindus but support no specific political party or candidate.

== Kenya ==
HSS Kenya was started in Nairobi on 14 January 1947 by Jagadish Chandra Shastri and Maneklal Rughani. It was originally known as Bharatiya Swayamsevak Sangh. Since then it has spread throughout Kenya with Shakhas operational in Mombasa, Nakuru, Kisumu, Eldoret, and Meru. HSS in Kenya also runs a socio-cultural-religious organisation of Hindus by the name of Hindu Religious Service Centre (HRSC). It was started in Nairobi in 1947.

== Nepal ==
The HSS was established in Nepal around 1992 by a group of Nepali students who were influenced by leaders of the Hindu nationalist RSS while studying in India. The two bodies share a similar Hindutva ideology. Their presence is particularly prevalent in the Terai region and they have regimented programs of education, dissemination of ideology and exercise as elsewhere in the world.

The Nepali HSS has been among several groups campaigning for a reversal of Nepal's 2006 decision to become a secular state after years of being ruled by a Hindu royal family. They say that the king had not favoured Hindus, that the decision was engineered by anti-Hindu groups, included communists and missionaries, and that in any event, it was unnecessary because there had been no persecution of religious minorities under the previous system. Among their demands has been that only Hindus should be appointed to high official posts.

== United States ==
HSS (US) was founded in 1989 and replicated the RSS's structure in the United States. Some leaders of the HSS (US) have received training from India's RSS.

== United Kingdom ==
HSS (UK) is a national charity founded in 1966 which operates over 117 centres across the UK, offering structured weekly programmes. The group provided key support to the RSS during the Emergency in India (1975–77) and, in 1977, launched a periodical titled "Sangh Sandesh" (Sangh's Message) in 1977 to communicate with Hindutva organizers globally. The HSS UK also operates Sangh Shiksha Varg (SSV), a flagship nine-day annual Leadership Development Programme for children, which has been criticized for spreading anti-Muslim and anti-Christian views.

The HSS in the UK is linked to other RSS-inspired organizations within the UK, with many founders having grown up with HSS. Some linked organisations include the Vishwa Hindu Parishad (UK), Overseas Friends of BJP, and National Hindu Students' Forum.

The HSS in the UK was subjected to a Charity Commission inquiry in 2016 because a documentary included undercover footage that showed bigoted remarks being made at an HSS summer camp. Specifically, a teacher HSS summer camp telling children that "the number of good Muslims 'can be counted on one finger'" and that "to destroy Hindu history is the secret conspiracy of the Christians". The inquiry concluded that the HSS had engaged in mismanagement and its trustees had failed in their duty under charity law, although the report also failed to find formal HSS-RSS links.

== Poland ==
HSS in the Poland was established in 2022. Since then, weekly shakhas are conducted where volunteers get together to do exercises, play physical & mental games, brainstorm on topics thereby ensuring overall development of an individual. Some more events such as family picnics, sahbhoj, etc. are also organized in regular intervals.

== Presence elsewhere ==
The RSS announced in 2014 that there were plans to establish HSS chapters in countries such as Denmark, Spain, Germany, Finland, France, Italy, the Netherlands, Poland, Japan, Sweden and Norway. It claimed that the two organisations worked closely together and shared a similar ideology but were not as one.
