= Yashwantrao =

Yashwantrao is a given name. Notable people with the name include:

- Yashwantrao Chavan (1913–1984), Indian independence activist, 5th Deputy Prime Minister of India
- Yashwantrao Ghatge (1874–1922), ruler of the princely state of Kolhapur in British India
- Yashwantrao Holkar (1776–1811), Raja of Indore State & military officer of the Maratha Empire
- Yashwantrao Holkar II (1908–1961), the Maharaja of Indore, Holkar State, in present-day Madhya Pradesh
- Yashwantrao Kelkar, Indian Hindutva activist
- Yashwantrao Mohite (1920–2009), Indian politician, former member of the Lok Sabha
- Yashwantrao Martandrao Mukne (1917–1978), Koli Maharaja of Jawhar State
- Dnyandeo Yashwantrao Patil (born 1935), Indian politician, Governor of Bihar, West Bengal and Tripura
- Yashwantrao Gadakh Patil (born 1943), veteran leader of Nationalist Congress Party from Maharashtra
- Yashwantrao Thorat, military commander and the main supporter of Sambhaji II of Kolhapur from 1717 to 1719

== See also ==
- Yeshwantrao
