= Akhil Bharatiya Vidyarthi Parishad =

RSS-affiliated student organisation

Akhil Bharatiya Vidyarthi Parishad (ABVP)
- Official logo of the ABVP
- Formation: July 9, 1949; 77 years ago
- Type: Student organisation
- Legal status: Active
- Headquarters: Mumbai, Maharashtra, India
- Region served: India
- Members: 76,98,448 (2025-26)
- National President: Raghuraj Kishore Tiwari
- National General Secretary: Virendra Singh Solanki
- National Organising Secretary: Ashish Chauhan
- Parent organization: Rashtriya Swayamsevak Sangh (RSS)
- Website: www.abvp.org

The Akhil Bharatiya Vidyarthi Parishad (ABVP) is a student organisation in India, which was established in 1949. One of the largest student organisations in the world, the ABVP is a student wing of the Rashtriya Swayamsevak Sangh (RSS), a right-wing Hindutva paramilitary organisation.

== History ==
The ABVP, founded in 1948 with the initiative of the RSS activist Balraj Madhok, was formally registered on 9 July 1949. Its purpose when founded was to counter communist influence on university campuses. Yashwantrao Kelkar, a lecturer in Bombay, became its main organiser in 1958. According to the ABVP website, he built the organisation into what it is now and is considered to be 'the real architect of the ABVP'.

Various branches of the ABVP have been involved in Hindu-Muslim communal riots since 1961. However, in the 1970s, the ABVP also increasingly took on issues concerning the lower middle classes like corruption and government inertia. The ABVP played a leading role in the agitational politics of the 1970s during the Bihar Movement. Many leaders like, Yashwantrao Kelkar, Dattopant Thengadi, Manmohan G. Vaidya, Sunil Ambekar, played an instrumental role in expanding ABVP's presence in campuses across India. This led to collaboration among student activists in Gujarat and Bihar. The ABVP gained significantly from such efforts after the Emergency and experienced a growth in membership.

By 1974, the ABVP had 160,000 members across 790 campuses and had gained control over several prominent universities, including Delhi University via student elections. By 1983, the organisation had 250,000 members and 1,100 branches. ABVP grew during the 1990s, receiving more support as a result of the Babri Masjid demolition and the economic liberalisation pursued by the P. V. Narasimha Rao government. It continued to grow after the United Progressive Alliance came to power in 2003, trebling in membership to 3.175 million members as of 2016.

== Links to the BJP ==
The ABVP spokespersons insist that the ABVP is not affiliated with the Bharatiya Janata Party (BJP). It is described as the "student wing" of the RSS. However, both the BJP and the ABVP are members of the Sangh Parivar. The BJP is said to gain from the ABVP's support base and several politicians of the BJP, including the current Home Minister Amit Shah and former Finance Minister Arun Jaitley, had their ideological foundation in the ABVP. Several scholars make no distinction between the RSS and the BJP, and regard the ABVP as a student wing of both of them or either of them.

In 2017, the ABVP faced a string of losses in student body elections. They included Delhi's Jawaharlal Nehru University and Delhi University, but also the University of Allahabad and Mahatma Gandhi Kashi Vidyapith in Uttar Pradesh, the Gujarat University and the Gauhati University. The loss in the Kashi Vidyapeeth was considered significant since it is in Varanasi, Prime Minister Narendra Modi's home constituency. This is said to have caused alarm in the BJP, which set up a committee to study the issues causing the ABVP's decline. ABVP bounced back in 2018 by winning the key posts of president, vice-president and joint secretary of students polls of Delhi University. ABVP won all six seats in the Hyderabad Central University students union polls after eight years in 2018.

== Activities ==
The ABVP's manifesto includes agendas such as educational and university reforms. ABVP conducts self-defense training program for girls titled "Mission Sahasi" all over India.

ABVP members in 2012

== Violence ==
ABVP has been accused of multiple violent incidents, including stone pelting, arson, vandalism and physical assault, on college and school campuses and elsewhere.

On 2 May 2018, ABVP members joined with members of the Hindu Yuva Vahini at Aligarh Muslim University and burned an effigy of Jinnah, which led to violent clashes.

On 5 January 2020, according to the Jawaharlal Nehru University Students' Union, masked ABVP members attacked JNU students, smashing cars and pelting stones, while ABVP accused left wing organisations. ABVP later confessed the same on national media. In a sting operation, and the veracity of ABVP's involvement was also found out through investigative journalism which was later confirmed by Delhi Police. A total of 28 people were injured, including students and teachers.

On 17 April 2026, clashes broke out during student council elections at Delhi University's Gargi College, an all-women's college, after Delhi University Students Union (DUSU) president Aryan Maan and other ABVP members were accused of forcibly entering the campus after being denied entry under the college's rules on male visitors. Police intervened and escorted Maan and others out of the premises.

== Links Abroad ==
The ABVP has mirror student organizations abroad. These include the National Hindu Students Forum (NHSF) in the U.K., "the official correspondent for the ABVP", and the Hindu YUVA and Hindu Students Council in the U.S. "modeled on India's Akhil Bharatiya Vidyarthi Parishad".

== See also ==
- Indian Youth Congress
- Students' Federation of India
- Muslim Students Federation (I. U. M. L.)
