= Dr. B. R. Ambedkar Institute of Technology =

Engineering college of India

- Type: Government Engineering & Technical college
- Established: 1984
- Affiliations: Degree program Affiliated to Netaji Subash Chandra Bose Institute of Higher Learning (Deemed University) & the Diploma program Affiliated by MSBTE
- Principal: Dr. Utpal Sharma
- Location: Port Blair. Andaman & Nicobar Islands, India; 11.636°N 92.717°E
- Campus: 46.8 acres; Urban
- Website: https://dbrait.andaman.gov.in/

Dr. B. R. Ambedkar Institute of Technology, established in 1984, is the oldest engineering college in Port Blair, in the Andaman and Nicobar Islands, India. It offers degree and diploma courses in engineering and maritime programmes. The institute also offers various non-formal courses in the campus as well as through its extension centre spread over different islands of Andaman and Nicobar Islands. All the courses which are being offered for more than four years have been accredited by NBA.

== History ==
Dr. B. R. Ambedkar Institute of Technology was established in 1984 as Dr. B. R. Ambedkar Govt. Polytechnic. In 1989, a second Govt. Polytechnic was established in the same campus. This college has been renamed as Dr. B. R. Ambedkar Institute of Technology in 2010, when engineering degree courses were introduced. The institute was one of the first technical institute in the country to get ISO 9000 accreditation way back in 1999, which was subsequently upgraded to 9001:2008 standards. The institute also obtained ISO 14000 accreditation.

== Courses offered under Degree Programme ==
- Civil Engineering.
- Electronics & Communication Engineering.
- Computer Science Engineering.

== Courses offered under Diploma Programme ==
- Civil Engineering
- Computer Engineering.
- Electrical Engineering.
- Electronics & Communication Engineering.
- Information and Technology.
- Mechanical Engineering.
- Hotel Management and Catering Technology
- Maritime course
