= Yashwantrao Kelkar =

Indian politician

Main Organiser

Personal details
- Born: 25 April 1920
- Education: Pune University, Pune
- Occupation: Activist, politician
- Profession: Lecturer, Mumbai University, Mumbai

Yashwantrao Kelkar was an Indian political activist and politician.

Originally an activist of the Hindutva paramilitary organisation Rashtriya Swayamsevak Sangh (RSS), he became the architect of the present-day Akhil Bharatiya Vidyarthi Parishad (ABVP) student organisation. Kelkar graduated from Pune University in BA Literature. He became an active Sangh pracharak after graduation. Later, he became a professor at Mumbai University. ABVP was formed by Balraj Madhok in 1948 and Kelkar became its city president and then the state president. He started several activities for student unity and mobilization across the organization, establishing ABVP's core philosophy.

ABVP awards Yashwantrao Kelkar Award each year to recognize young social and political activists. ABVP awarded Yashwantrao Kelkar Yuva Puraskar to mathematician Anand Kumar, the Super 30 educator, in 2010. The award is named after Yashwantrao Kelkar.
