= Mahatma Gandhi Government College =

- Type: Undergraduate college
- Established: 1990
- Academic affiliations: Pondicherry University
- Location: Mayabunder, Andaman and Nicobar Islands, India; 12.875°N 92.924°E
- Campus: Rural
- Website: http://www.and.nic.in/archives/mggc/about.html

Mahatma Gandhi Government College, Mayabunder is the only college in Mayabunder, Andaman and Nicobar Islands in India. It was set up in 1990 at Car Nicobar as Government College which was shifted to Mayabunder in 1994 and renamed as Mahatma Gandhi Government College on 5 December 1994. It offers undergraduate courses in six discipline. It now has total strength of 760 with 44 teaching staff, 30 non-teaching staff and more than 50 supporting staff. It is affiliated to Pondicherry University.

== Students Activism ==
=== ABVP Delegates visited MGGC Campus ===
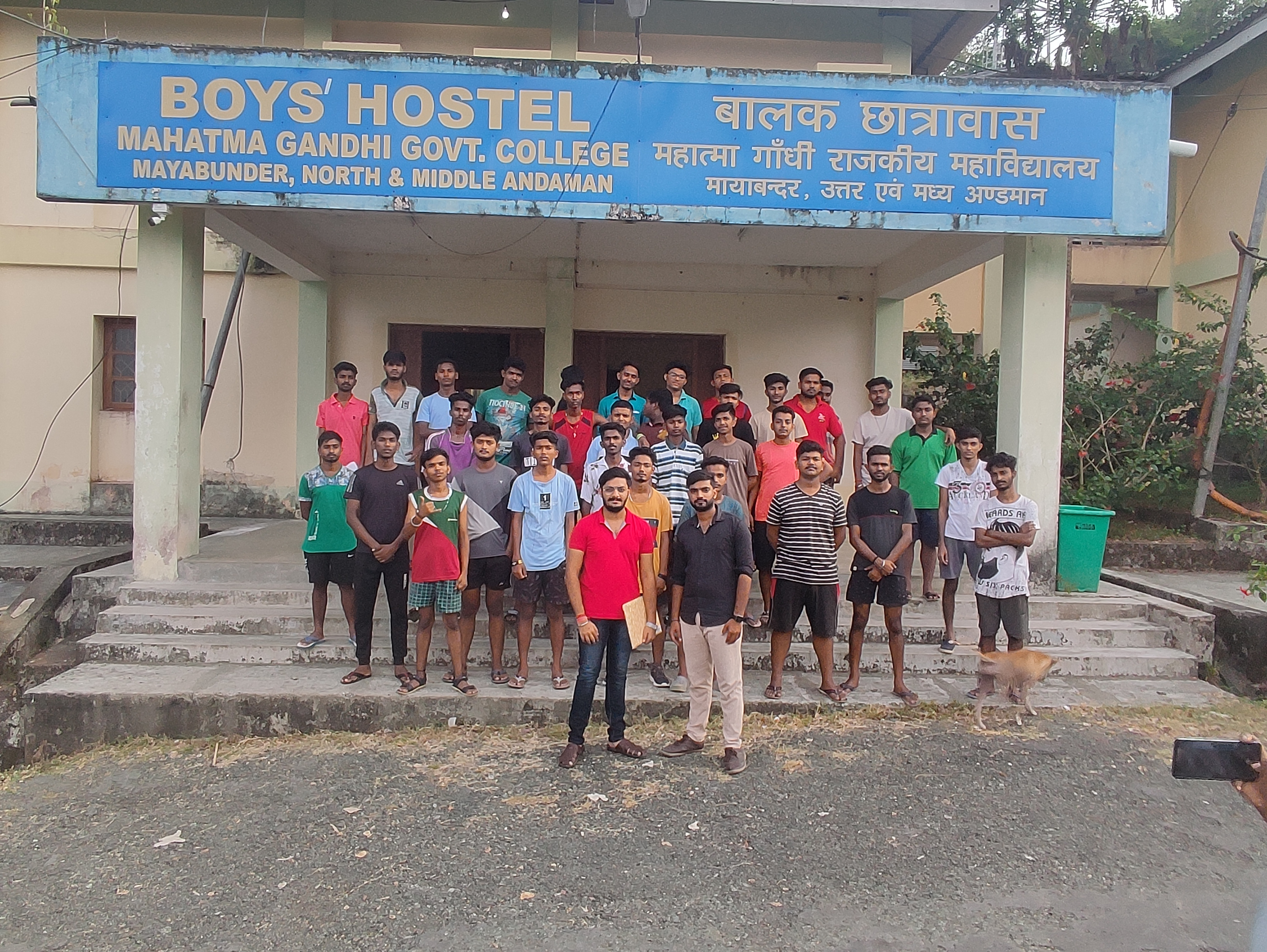
The image showing Siddhanth Rai Sharma meeting with MGGC Boys' hostel students on 28 April 2022.

In April 2022 then ABVP delegation under the leadership of Siddhanth Rai Sharma an student leader of Andaman and Nicobar Islands visited MGGC. This visit was of 3 days. During the visit Sharma interacted will the students of MGGC College. He also listened to the problems of the students faced in the institution.

== Controversies ==
In 2022 During the period of Local Body Elections in Andaman and Nicobar Islands. MGGC Administration passed a partial order regarding Hostel facilities. The order provided a partial treatment for the girls hostel but not for the boys' hostel. Siddhanth Rai Sharma an ABVP Student Leader of Andaman and Nicobar Islands, condemned the decision. He expressed his objection through a representation to Andaman & Nicobar Administration. MGGC administration immediately revoked the order which was said to be unjust.
