= Andaman and Nicobar Islands Institute of Medical Sciences =

Medical college in Andaman and Nicobar, India

- Type: Public
- Established: 2015; 11 years ago
- Academic affiliations: Pondicherry University, NMC
- Director: Dr. Mukesh Tripathi
- Faculty: 144 (updated 10-Aug-2017)
- Undergraduates: 100 (MBBS) per year
- Location: Atlanta Point, Port Blair; 11.673°N 92.746°E
- Website: aniims.andamannicobar.gov.in

Andaman and Nicobar Islands Institute of Medical Sciences, Port Blair is a medical school in Port Blair, India. Andaman & Nicobar Islands Institute of Medical Sciences (ANIIMS) is a 100% Govt. funded College established by Andaman & Nicobar Medical Education and Research Society (ANIMERS) under Andaman & Nicobar Administration. The medical school is established under the Centrally Sponsored Scheme for 'Establishment of new (58 colleges) Medical Colleges attached with existing district/referral hospitals'.

The College was set up in a record time of less than an year

== Location ==
It is situated at Atlanta Point, next to the National Memorial Cellular Jail Complex, Port Blair, South Andaman District, Andaman and Nicobar Islands. The permanent location of the college, where new infrastructure is being constructed is Corbyns Cove, South Point, Port Blair, South Andaman District.

== Teaching Hospital ==
GB Pant Hospital also serves as a referral hospital for the entire A & N Islands. It has almost all general specialties. The new OPD Block houses outpatient department, reception / central registration, diagnostic laboratories, blood bank and auditorium / lecture Hall. The services provided at the Hospital is 100% free regardless of income, insurance status, race, sex and country of origin.

== Departments ==
- Anaesthesiology
- Anatomy
- Biochemistry
- Community Medicine
- Dentistry
- Dermatology
- ENT
- Forensic Medicine
- Medicine
- Microbiology
- Obstetrics & Gynaecology
- Ophthalmology
- Orthopaedics
- Paediatrics
- Pathology
- Pharmacology
- Physiology
- Psychiatry
- Radiology
- Surgery
- TB & Chest

== Admission ==
The college admits 100 students for the graduate program of Bachelor of Medicine and Bachelor of Surgery (MBBS) students annually. Candidates are selected on the basis of their performance in the National Eligibility and Entrance Test (NEET). 75% of available undergraduate positions are reserved for the students of Andaman & Nicobar Islands, 10% are reserved for NRI's and 15% are reserved for All India Quota.
