= National Hindu Students' Forum =

Organization

National Hindu Students' Forum (UK)
- Abbreviation: NHSF (UK)
- Founded: 1991
- Region served: UK
- Website: NHSF (UK)

The National Hindu Students' Forum (NHSF (UK)) is a network of Hindu societies operating on university and further education campuses in the United Kingdom. It is the largest Hindu nationalist group currently operating in the UK and maintains ties with other Sangh Parivar groups.

== History ==
The NHSF (UK) was started in 1991 by young British Hindus.

In early years the NHSF had the same address as the Hindu Swayamsevak Sangh in the UK, per Manoj Ladwa, the then HSS spokesman. Ladwa later served as a senior advisor to Narendra Modi during his successful Indian election campaign of 2014.

As of 2024, the NHSF has around 4,000 members across forty-five branches.

== Sangh Parivar Links ==
The NHSF has well documented links with other members of the Sangh Parivar, a group of Hindutva organisations. This includes, among others, the paramilitary organisation Rashtriya Swayamsevak Sangh and the Bharatiya Janata Party.

At least through 2004, the NHSF openly admitted having "a close working relationship" with the HSS, a Hindu nationalist group, on its website. In 2018, an HSS Instagram story claimed the NHSF as part of "our extended parivar", and personal overlap between the NHSF, HSS, and other Hindu nationalist groups.
