= Malvika Singh =

Indian author (born 1949)

- Born: 1949 (age 76–77); Mumbai
- Education: Modern School; National School of Drama
- Occupations: Writer, historian, columist
- Relatives: Father (Romesh Thapar)
- Writing career
- Notable work: New Delhi: Making of a Capital (2009)

Malvika Singh, also known as Mala Singh, (born 1949) is an Indian author, historian, editor of Seminar, and advocate of Indian handicrafts. Her books include New Delhi: Making of a Capital (2009).

== Early life and education ==
Malvika Singh, known affectionately as Mala, was born in 1949 in Mumbai, to Romesh Thapar and his wife Raj. Her younger brother was Valmik Thapar. By her teens the family had moved to Delhi where she attended Modern School. After leaving Miranda House she attended the National School of Drama.

== Career ==
In her early twenties, Singh was employed by Pupul Jayakar at the Handicrafts and Handlooms Corporation of India, working at its handicrafts store in Cambridge, Massachusetts. Ashok Advani then recruited her as editor of Business India.

Singh's history books include New Delhi: Making of a Capital, co-authored with Rudrangshu Mukherjee, edited by Pramod Kapoor, and published by Roli Books in 2009. In 2025 she published Saris of Memory, her book on the history the sari, an item she collects and employs as a metaphor for Indian identity. It features significant accounts of the revival of Indian handlooms in the post-independence period.

== Selected publications ==
- New Delhi: Making of a Capital. New Delhi: Lustre Press. 2009. ISBN 978-81-7436-574-3. (Co-author)
- Bhutan: Through the Lens of the King. New Delhi: Roli Books. 2012. ISBN 978-81-7436-859-1.
- Saris of Memory. New Delhi: NFW Productions Private Limited. 2024. ISBN 978-81-921586-8-6.
