= New Delhi: Making of a Capital =

2009 book by Malvika Singh and Rudrangshu Mukherjee

- First edition
- Language: English
- Genre: History
- Published: 2009
- Publisher: Roli Books
- ISBN: 978-8174368621

New Delhi: Making of a Capital is an illustrated coffee table book about the construction of the Indian capital New Delhi, written by Malvika Singh and Rudrangshu Mukherjee, edited by Pramod Kapoor and published by Roli Books in 2009. The book contains several previously unpublished images and newspaper cuttings, which show the wide coverage given in England on the extent of the project on building New Delhi.
