= T24 =

T24 or T-24 may refer to:

== Weapons and armour ==
- T-24 tank, a Soviet medium tank
- T24 Light Tank, an American prototype tank
- T24 machine gun, an American machine gun
- T24 (rocket), an American rocket design

== Rail and transit ==
- Kitachō Station, in Takamatsu, Kagawa, Japan
- Tanimachi Rokuchōme Station, in Chūō-ku, Osaka, Japan
- WEG T 24, a German railbus

== Other uses ==
- T24 (newspaper), a Turkish news site
- T-24 (tiger)
- California Building Standards Code, Title 24 of the California Code of Regulations
- Cooper T24, a racing car
- German torpedo boat T24
- The T24 banking package from Swiss firm, Temenos AG
