= Friends of South Asia (disambiguation) =

Friends of South Asia is the name of several organizations in North America:

An activist group:

- Friends of South Asia (FOSA), a primarily Indo-Pakistani peace group in the San Francisco Bay Area

A museum members' group:

- Friends of South Asia, a special interest group at the Royal Ontario Museum in Toronto

Groups in support of South Asian Studies departments:

- Friends of South Asia at the University of Chicago
- Friends of the South Asian Studies Council at Yale
