= Coalition Against Genocide =

The Coalition Against Genocide is a coalition of about 40 organisations mostly based in the United States and Canada, as well as individuals, who aim to respond to the 2002 Gujarat riots, which they refer to as the "Gujarat genocide", in order to "demand accountability and justice". The coalition of organisations protested against the visit of Narendra Modi, the Chief Minister of Gujarat, to the United States in March 2005. Modi was denied a visa and did not visit the U.S. at that time.

== History ==
Angana Chatterji helped form and worked with the Coalition Against Genocide. The Coalition was subject to much public targeting after some incriminating documents and an anti-Chatterji online petition to the President and Board of Trustees of CIIS appeared.

In July 2008, the coalition again protested against another visit by Modi to the United States, claiming that "the conditions under which he was denied a visa in 2005 remain largely unchanged and the minority community in the state continues to face human rights violations. Modi was again denied a visa by the United States State Department.

== Coalition members ==
The coalition claims the following members:

Claimed member	Declared affiliation of member, per registration or charter documents	Status	Reference
Alliance for a Secular and Democratic South Asia (ASDSA)			
Alliance of South Asians Taking Action (ASATA)	Plural	Affiliate of Friends of South Asia	
American Federation of Muslims of Indian Origin (AFMI)	Muslim		
Association of Indian Muslims of America (AIM)	Muslim		
Association of South Asian Progressives (ASAP)		Not operating, Unregistered entity	
Building Bridges of Understanding Coalition (BB)	Muslim		
Coalition for a Secular and Democratic India (CSDI)		Not operating, Unregistered entity	
Campaign to Stop Funding Hate (CSFH)	Anti-Hindutva		
Center for Study and Research in South Asia (CERAS, Montreal)		Not operating, Unregistered entity	
Coalition against Communalism (CAC)		Not operating, On hiatus	
Dharma Megha Inc	See Vedanta Society of East Lansing	Legally registered as Vedanta Society of East Lansing (Double counted)	
EKTA		Not operating, On hiatus	
Federation of Indian American Christian Organizations of North America (FIACONA)		Not operating, not registered with IRS	
Forum of Inquilabi Leftists (FOIL)	Muslim	Linked to INSAF	
Foundation For Pluralism		Not operating, Unregistered entity	
Friends of South Asia (FOSA)	Plural	Active on South Asian, and non-South Asia Arab issues	
Indian Christian Forum (ICF)		Not operating, Unregistered entity	
Indian Muslim Educational Foundation of North America (IMEFNA)	Muslim	Registered non-profit, politically active	
Indian Muslim Council-USA (IMC-USA)	Muslim	Renamed to: Indian American Muslim Council	
Indian Muslim Relief and Charities (IMRC)	Muslim	Connected to 100 Muslim organization in India	
Indian Progressive Study Group of Los Angeles (IPSG-LA)		Not operating, Unregistered entity	
International South Asia Forum (INSAF)	Plural, Leftist		
Manavi (An organization for South Asian women)	Plural	Signed a letter on Gujarat in 2004, no comment thereafter	
Muslim Youth Awareness Alliance (MYAA)	Muslim	Not active after 2011	
NRI's for Secular and Harmonious India (NRI-SAHI)		Not operating, Unregistered entity Linked to EKTA	
Organizing Youth (OY)		Not operating, Unregistered entity Linked to EKTA, Youth Solidarity Summer	
Policy Institute For Religion And State (PIFRAS)	Plural	Issued a note on Gujarat in 2002 that dialogue is needed without being anti-Hindu, Does not claim membership to coalition	
Sikh American Heritage Organization (SAHO)		Not operating, Unregistered entity	
Sneha (A network for women of South Asian origin)	Plural	No statement on Gujarat; Does not claim membership to coalition	
South Asian Collective (SAC)		Not operating, Unregistered entity	
South Asian Magazine for Action and Reflection (SAMAR)	Plural	Mostly Muslim issues	
South Asian Network for Secularism and Democracy (SANSAD, Canada)	Muslim, Leftist	Canada, spin off of NRISAD	
South Asian Progressive Action Collective (SAPAC)	Plural	Issued a note on Gujarat in 2010 that dialogue is needed between Hindu and Muslim, against Mumbai terror and need to protect Muslims as well, Does not claim membership to coalition	
Students For Bhopal (SFB)	Bhopal related, Anti-Dow	No statement on Gujarat; Does not claim membership to coalition	
Supporters of Human Rights in India (SHRI)	Muslim	Not operating, Unregistered entity	
The Organization of Universal Communal Harmony (TOUCH)		Not operating, Unregistered entity	
Vaishnava Center for Enlightenment	Hindu	Issued a note and TV video on Gujarat, urging dialogue between Hindus and Muslims, Does not claim membership to coalition	
Vedanta Society of East Lansing	Legal name is Dharma Megha Inc. Michigan State official records	Issued a note that dialogue and peace is needed between Hindu and Muslim, Does not claim membership to coalition	
Voices for Freedom (VFF)	Sikh	Published an author's opinion on Gujarat in 2009, Does not claim membership to coalition	
World Tamil Organisation (WTO)	Legal name is World Thamil Organization, Inc.	Does not claim membership to coalition	
Youth Solidarity Summer (YSS)	Muslim, Leftist	Not active after 2007	
