= Romila Thapar =

Indian historian (born 1931)

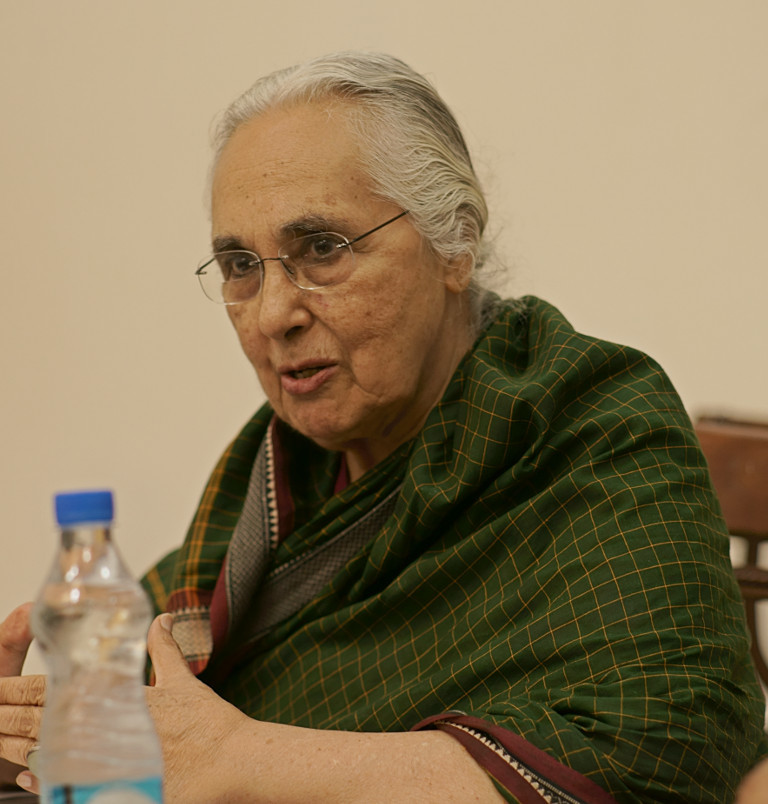
- Thapar in 2016
- Born: 30 November 1931 (age 94); Lucknow, United Provinces, British India
- Occupations: Historian, Writer
- Known for: Authoring books about Indian history
- Father: Daya Ram Thapar
- Relatives: Romesh Thapar (brother); Valmik Thapar (nephew); Pran Nath Thapar (uncle); Karan Thapar (cousin)
- Awards: Kluge Prize, 2008.

Academic background
- Education: Panjab University; SOAS University of London (PhD)
- Thesis: Asoka and the decline of the Mauryas
- Doctoral advisor: Arthur Llewellyn Basham

Romila Thapar (born 30 November 1931) is an Indian historian. Her principal area of study is ancient India, a field in which she is pre-eminent. Thapar is a Emeritus Professor of Ancient History, at the Jawaharlal Nehru University in Delhi.

Thapar's special contribution is the use of social-historical methods to understand change in the mid-first millennium BCE in northern India. As lineage-based Indo-Aryan pastoral groups moved into the Gangetic Plain, they created rudimentary forms of caste-based states. The epics Ramayana and the Mahabharata, in her analysis, offer vignettes of how these groups and others negotiated new, more complex, forms of loyalty in which stratification, purity, and exclusion played a greater if still fluid role.

The author of From Lineage to State, Asoka and the Decline of the Mauryas, Early India: From Origins to AD 1300, and the popular History of India, Part I, Thapar has received honorary doctorates from the University of Chicago, the University of Oxford, Institut National des Langues et Civilisations Orientales, Paris, the University of Edinburgh, University of Calcutta, University of Hyderabad, Brown University, and the University of Pretoria.

Thapar is an Honorary Fellow of the School of Oriental and African Studies, London, where she also received her Ph.D. in 1958, and a Foreign Honorary Member of the American Academy of Arts and Sciences. In 2008, Romila Thapar shared the US Library of Congress's Kluge Prize, for Lifetime Achievement in the Humanities and Social Sciences. Thapar takes a secular approach to historiography, and has been critical of Hindutva nationalist and comunalist historiography and the history textbook changes implemented by the BJP.

== Early life, family and education ==
Romila is the daughter of Lieutenant-General Daya Ram Thapar, CIE, OBE, who served as the Director-General of the British Indian Armed Forces Medical Services. The late journalist Romesh Thapar was her brother.

As a child, she attended schools in various cities in India depending on her father's military postings. She is an alumna of the St. Mary's School, Pune. Later she attended intermediate of arts at Wadia College, Pune. After graduating from Panjab University in English literature, Thapar obtained a second bachelor's honours degree and a doctorate in Indian history under A. L. Basham from the School of Oriental and African Studies, the University of London in 1958.

== Work ==
She was a reader in Ancient Indian History at Kurukshetra University in 1961 and 1962 and held the same position at Delhi University between 1963 and 1970. Later, she worked as Professor of Ancient Indian History at the Jawaharlal Nehru University, where she is now Professor Emerita.

As a historian at JNU she was one of very few academics who refused to sign a letter praising Indira Gandhi's administration during the Emergency period of 1975-77, and as a result Thapar "had her income-tax assessments for the previous decade reopened for questioning."

Thapar's major works are Aśoka and the Decline of the Mauryas, Ancient Indian Social History: Some Interpretations, Recent Perspectives of Early Indian History (editor), A History of India Volume One, and Early India: From the Origins to AD 1300.

Her historical work portrays the origins of Hinduism as an evolving interplay between social forces. Her 2004 book on Somnath examines the evolution of the historiographies about the legendary Gujarat temple.

In her first work, Aśoka and the Decline of the Maurya published in 1961, Thapar situates Ashoka's policy of dhamma in its social and political context, as a non-sectarian civic ethic intended to hold together an empire of diverse ethnicities and cultures. She attributes the decline of the Maurya Empire to its highly centralised administration which called for rulers of exceptional abilities to function well.

Thapar's first volume of A History of India is written for a popular audience and encompasses the period from its early history to the arrival of Europeans in the sixteenth century.

Ancient Indian Social History deals with the period from early times to the end of the first millennium, includes a comparative study of Hindu and Buddhist socio-religious systems, and examines the role of Buddhism in social protest and social mobility in the caste system. From Lineage to State analyses the formation of states in the middle Ganga valley in the first millennium BCE, tracing the process to a change, driven by the use of iron and plough agriculture, from a pastoral and mobile lineage-based society to one of settled peasant holdings, accumulation and increased urbanisation.

== Views ==
=== On Hindutva nationalist historiography ===
Thapar is critical of what she calls a "communal interpretation" of Indian history, in which events in the last thousand years are interpreted solely in terms of a notional continual conflict between monolithic Hindu and Muslim communities. Thapar says this communal history is "extremely selective" in choosing facts, "deliberately partisan" in interpretation and does not follow current methods of analysis using multiple, prioritised causes.

In 2002, the Indian coalition government led by the Bharatiya Janata Party (BJP) changed the school textbooks for social sciences and history, on the grounds that certain passages offended the sensibilities of some religious and caste groups. Romila Thapar, who was the author of the textbook on Ancient India for class VI, objected to the changes made without her permission that, for example, deleted passages on eating of beef in ancient times, and on the formulation of the caste system. She questioned whether the changes were an "attempt to replace mainstream history with a Hindutva version of history", with the view to use the resultant controversy as "election propaganda". Other historians and commentators, including Bipan Chandra, Sumit Sarkar, Irfan Habib, R.S. Sharma, Vir Sanghvi, Dileep Padgaonkar and Amartya Sen also protested the changes and published their objections in a compilation titled Communalisation of Education.

Writing about the 2006 Californian Hindu textbook controversy, Thapar opposed some of the changes that were proposed by Hindu groups to the coverage of Hinduism and Indian history in school textbooks. She contended that while Hindus have a legitimate right to a fair and culturally sensitive representation, some of the proposed changes included material that pushed a political agenda.

=== Marxist historiography ===
Though not necessarily a political Marxist herself, Thapar's historiography has been influenced by Marxist historiography. This approach explains historical developments from the material needs of peoples, and the conflicts of social forces and their solutions. In this view, "Economic changes or changes in economic structure influence the social relationships as well as political developments. According to Wesley, "The Marxian historiography of India has focused on studies of economic development, land ownership, and class conflict in precolonial India and deindustrialization during the colonial period". The Encyclopedia of Historians and Historical Writing entry on Thapar notes that her work is distinct from that of Marxist scholar D.D. Kosambi.

== Recognition and honours ==
Thapar has been a visiting professor at Cornell University, the University of Pennsylvania, and the College de France in Paris. She was elected General President of the Indian History Congress in 1983 and a Corresponding Fellow of the British Academy in 1999. She was elected a Member of the American Philosophical Society in 2019.

She was awarded the Jawaharlal Nehru Fellowship in 1976. Thapar is an Honorary Fellow at Lady Margaret Hall, Oxford, and at the School of Oriental and African Studies (SOAS), University of London. She holds honorary doctorates from the University of Chicago, the Institut National des Langues et Civilisations Orientales in Paris, the University of Oxford, the University of Edinburgh (2004), the University of Calcutta (2002) and from the University of Hyderabad (2009). She was elected a Foreign Honorary Member of the American Academy of Arts and Sciences in 2009. She was also elected an Honorary Fellow of St Antony's College, Oxford, in 2017.

In 2004, the US Library of Congress appointed her as the first holder of the Kluge Chair in Countries and Cultures of the South.

In January 2005, she declined the Padma Bhushan awarded by the Indian Government. In a letter to President A P J Abdul Kalam, she said she was "astonished to see her name in the list of awardees because three months ago when I was contacted by the HRD ministry and asked if I would accept an award, I made my position very clear and explained my reason for declining it". Thapar had declined the Padma Bhushan on an earlier occasion, in 1992. To the President, she explained the reason for turning down the award thus: "I only accept awards from academic institutions or those associated with my professional work, and not state awards".

She is co-winner with Peter Brown of the Kluge Prize for the Study of Humanity for 2008 which comes with a US$1 million prize.

== Bibliography ==
=== Books ===
- Aśoka and the Decline of the Mauryas, 1961 (revision 1998); Oxford University Press, ISBN 0-19-564445-X
- A History of India: Volume 1, 1966; Penguin, ISBN 0-14-013835-8
- Ancient India, Medieval India, 1966, 1968 sq.; NCERT Textbooks
- The Past and Prejudice (Sardar Patel Memorial Lectures), National Book Trust, 1975, ISBN 81-237-0639-1
- Ancient Indian Social History: Some Interpretations, 1978, Orient Blackswan, ISBN 978-81-250-0808-8
- Exile and the Kingdom: Some Thoughts on the Rāmāyana, Rao Bahadur R. Narasimhachar Endowment lecture, 1978;
- Dissent in the Early Indian Tradition, Volume 7 of M.N. Roy memorial lecture, 1979; Indian Renaissance Institute
- From Lineage to State: Social Formations of the Mid-First Millennium B.C. in the Ganges Valley, 1985; Oxford University Press (OUP), ISBN 978-0-19-561394-0
- The Mauryas Revisited, Sakharam Ganesh Deuskar lectures on Indian history, 1987; K.P. Bagchi & Co., ISBN 978-81-7074-021-6
- Interpreting Early India, 1992 (2nd edition 1999); Oxford University Press 1999, ISBN 0-19-563342-3
- Cultural Transaction and Early India: Tradition and Patronage, Two Lectures, 1994; OUP, ISBN 978-0-19-563364-1
- Śakuntala: Texts, Readings, Histories, 2002; Anthem, ISBN 1-84331-026-0
- History and Beyond, 2000; OUP, ISBN 978-0-19-566832-2
- Cultural Pasts: Essays in Early Indian History, 2003; OUP, ISBN 0-19-566487-6
- Early India: From Origins to AD 1300, 2002; Penguin, ISBN 0-520-23899-0
- Somanatha: The Many Voices of History, 2005; Verso, ISBN 1-84467-020-1
- India: Historical Beginnings and the Concept of the Aryan, Essays by Thapar, et al., 2006; National Book Trust, ISBN 978-81-237-4779-8
- The Aryan: Recasting Constructs, Three Essays, 2008; Delhi, ISBN 978-81-88789-68-9
- The Past before Us: Historical Traditions of Early North India, 2013; Permanent Black, Harvard University Press, ISBN 978-0-674-72523-2
- The Past As Present: Forging Contemporary Identities Through History, 2014; Aleph, ISBN 93-83064-01-3
- Which of Us are Aryans?: Rethinking the Concept of Our Origins. 2019, Aleph. ISBN 978-93-88292-38-2
- Voices of Dissent: An Essay, 2020; Seagull Books, ISBN 978-0-85742-862-2
- The Future in the Past: Essays and Reflections, 2023; Aleph Book Company, ISBN 978-9395853149
- Our History, Their History, Whose History?, 2023; Seagull Books, ISBN 978-1803093543
- Speaking of History: Conversations about India's Past and Present, 2025; Penguin India, ISBN 978-9373030562
- Just Being: A Memoir, 2026; Seagull Books, ISBN 978-1803096308

=== Editor ===
- Communalism and the Writing of Indian History, Romila Thapar, Harbans Mukhia, Bipan Chandra, 1969 People's Publishing House
- Situating Indian History: For Sarvepalli Gopal, 1987; OUP, ISBN 978-0-19-561842-6
- Indian Tales, 1991; Puffin, ISBN 0-14-034811-5
- India: Another Millennium? 2000; Viking, ISBN 978-0-14-029883-3

=== Select papers, articles and chapters ===
- "India before and after the Mauryan Empire", in The Cambridge Encyclopedia of Archaeology, 1980; ISBN 978-0-517-53497-7
- "Imagined Religious Communities? Ancient History and the Modern Search for a Hindu Identity", Paper in Modern Asian Studies, 1989; doi:10.1017/S0026749X00001049
- Thapar, Romila (1996), "The Theory of Aryan Race and India: History and Politics", Social Scientist, 24 (1/3): 3–29, doi:10.2307/3520116, JSTOR 3520116
- "Somanatha and Mahmud", Frontline, Volume 16 – Issue 8, 10–23 April 1999
- Perceiving the Forest: Early India, Paper in the journal, Studies in History, 2001; doi:10.1177/025764300101700101
- Role of the Army in the Exercise of Power, Essay in Army and Power in the Ancient World, 2002; Franz Steiner Verlag, ISBN 978-3-515-08197-9
- The Puranas: Heresy and the Vamsanucarita", Essay in Ancient to Modern: Religion, Power and Community in India, 2009; OUP, ISBN 978-0-19-569662-2
- Rāyā Asoko from Kanaganahalli: Some Thoughts, Essay in Airavati, Chennai, 2008;
- Was there Historical Writing in Early India?, Essay in Knowing India, 2011; Yoda Press, ISBN 978-93-80403-03-8

== Sources ==
- Guichard, Sylvie (2010), The Construction of History and Nationalism in India, Routledge, ISBN 978-1136949319
- Wesley, Samuel (2023). "Marxist School of Indian Historiography" (PDF). Episteme: an online interdisciplinary, multidisciplinary & multi-cultural journal, Volume 11, Issue 4 March 2023.
