= Tiger 24 =

2022 documentary film

- Directed by: Warren Pereira
- Written by: Warren Pereira
- Produced by: Howard Barish, Jeremy Bell, Eagle Egilsson, Ellen Goldsmith-Vein, Zach Mann, Stephen Nemeth, Warren Pereira
- Cinematography: Warren Pereira
- Edited by: Warren Pereira
- Music by: Pepijn Caudron
- Distributed by: Elevation Pictures, AA Films
- Release date: 2022

Tiger 24: The Making of a Man-Eater is a 2022 feature-length wildlife documentary film written, directed, and produced by Warren Pereira. It follows the story of a wild tiger known as T-24 (nicknamed "Ustad"), who was removed from Ranthambore Tiger Reserve in Rajasthan, India, after being accused of killing four people. The film explores the resulting legal and public battles, highlighting themes of conservation policy, animal rights, and media influence.

== Synopsis ==
The film documents the alleged killings by Tiger T-24 and his controversial removal to a zoo-like enclosure. It features interviews with activists, forest officials, legal experts, and villagers. The documentary builds tension around whether T-24 was a man-eater or a victim of bureaucratic overreach, culminating in a case presented to the High Court of Jaipur and Supreme Court of India.

== Cast ==
- Warren Pereira
- Valmik Thapar
- Yogesh Sahu
- Aditya Singh
- Chandrabal Singh
- Sarita Subramaniam
- Rajeev Garg

== Production ==
=== Development ===
The film was directed, produced, photographed, and edited by Warren Pereira under the W Films banner.

=== Filming ===
After choosing to focus the documentary on the tiger known as T-24 (Ustad), filming took place over three years, documenting its wild tiger behavior. After T-24 was removed from the wild following the deaths of several men who had entered its territory, the film shifted into an investigative narrative rather than a traditional nature documentary. Footage in the wild was primarily shot on the Canon C500 in 4K RAW format, providing one of the only known 4K RAW archival records of the wild tiger T-24 (Ustad).

The film was shot and edited over more than a decade, beginning in 2012, and includes extensive field footage from Ranthambore, Delhi, Pune, and Mumbai, alongside courtroom documentation, protest coverage, and expert commentary.

=== Post-production ===
After completing principal photography independently, Pereira entered a collaboration agreement with a Los Angeles-based production company for post-production support. When the arrangement was not carried through to completion due to creative differences, Pereira chose to finish the film on his own to maintain creative control, self-financing the post-production process and serving as the sole editor, editing in his Hollywood loft on an iMac over the course of three years from 2019 through 2021. Filmmaker friends contributed to the effort, including assistant editor Luis Alba, as well as creative consultants Jarret Rosenblatt, Phoenix Vaughn, Eric Hersey, and others who were credited on the film.

In 2019, following the breakup with the Los Angeles production company, Pereira explored several additional post-production collaboration agreements with other companies in the United States, Europe, and India. However, due to concerns over creative control and unfavorable financial terms, he ultimately chose to take on the editing himself. This decision proved arduous given the volume of footage collected over nearly a decade, which had to be condensed into a 90-minute investigative narrative.

=== Marketing ===
In January 2023, Indian actor John Abraham shared the film's trailer on social media to support wildlife conservation efforts.

== Release ==
Tiger 24 premiered at the Cleveland International Film Festival in April 2022, where it was nominated for the Greg Gund Memorial Standing Up Award. It won Best Feature Documentary at the 2022 Burbank International Film Festival That same year, the film was a finalist at the Jackson Wild Media Awards and received two nominations at the Wildscreen Festival for the prestigious Panda Awards. It won the Panda Award for Onscreen Talent at Wildscreen 2022. The film was an official selection at the 2022 Cinéfest Sudbury International Film Festival.

In 2022, the film was picked up for US and Canadian distribution by Elevation Pictures. It received a limited theatrical release in the United States and qualified for the Academy Awards.

Tiger 24 was released theatrically in India in January 2023 through AA Films. The film opened in multiple cities including Mumbai, Pune, Jaipur, and Delhi, screening at major multiplex chains such as PVR and Cinepolis. It was the first-ever theatrical release for a documentary centered on India's national animal, the tiger.

== Distribution ==
In March 2023, the film was licensed by Amazon Prime Video India. In August 2023, Netflix licensed the documentary.

== Reception ==
Boca referred to the film as a "labor of love" in its review of the project's long gestation and independent nature. Film Threat called it, "a compelling and dramatic story for animal lovers and fans of crime procedural." Marc Mohan from the Oregeon ArtsWatch wrote, "Even shorn of its subtexts, Tiger 24 contains intimate, unguarded footage of large predators that would make David Attenborough green with envy." It was also a Best Documentary Honorable Mention at the 2022 Fort Lauderdale International Film Festival.
