= Indian American Muslim Council =

Organization in the United States

- Indian American Muslim Council
- Abbreviation: IAMC
- Formation: 2002; 24 years ago
- Tax ID no.: 05-0532361
- Legal status: 501(c)(3) non-profit
- Region served: United States
- Official language: English
- Website: iamc.com

The Indian American Muslim Council (IAMC, formerly Indian Muslim Council-USA) is an advocacy organization of Indian American Muslims. It is a member of the Coalition Against Genocide.

== See also ==
- Hindu American Foundation

== Bibliography ==
- Mishra, Sangay K. (2016), Desis Divided: The Political Lives of South Asian Americans, University of Minnesota Press, ISBN 9781452949918
- Mishra, Sangay K. (2021), "Hindu nationalism and Indian American diasporic mobilizations", in Ruben Gowricharn (ed.), New Perspectives on the Indian Diaspora, Taylor & Francis, pp. 59–77, ISBN 9781000412574
