= Friends of South Asia =

South Asian American peace group

Friends of South Asia (FOSA) is a California, United States–based social and political activist organization. Founded jointly in 2001 by Americans of Pakistani and Indian origins, the group describes its mission as "achieve a peaceful, prosperous, and hate-free South Asia...work[ing] through people-to-people contacts, dialog, and other non-violent, non-exclusionary means." FOSA activism has touched upon issues inside South Asia, as well as outside South Asia such as those relating to Israel and United States policy in Cuba and Venezuela among others.

== History ==
FOSA was founded in December 2001 by a group of nine Pakistani Americans and Indian Americans, concerned that "the place we call home was full of war cries and that South Asia was on the brink of a war." Members organized candlelight vigils and letter-writing campaigns for peace, initially in collaboration with groups like the Sikh Qaumantri Punjabi Bhaichara (Punjabi International Friendship) Group of California. The local vigils grew out of a series of vigils for peace in South Asia held simultaneously in 18 cities around the world.

FOSA registered as a tax-exempt non-profit charitable entity in Arts, Culture and Humanities category with United States Internal Revenue Service (IRS). Its non-profit status remains revoked by the IRS, as of November 2013, because FOSA has failed to file required annual reports and certifications under United States laws for three consecutive years.

FOSA has an informal organizational structure, and a number of members have served as spokespeople. Group members have often collaborated with or co-sponsored events with other California South Asian American anti-communal organizations like EKTA and the Coalition against Communalism.

== Positions and activities ==
Friends of South Asia was described by Metro Santa Cruz in April 2006 as "a hodgepodge of mostly secular-leaning South Asian Hindus and Muslims—university students, Silicon Valley engineers moonlighting as activists, etc.—who regularly organize local vigils, poetry readings, films and speaker events relating to South Asian issues." Between 2008 and 2013, FOSA activities have included a variety of issues inside and outside South Asia.

=== Activism on issues in India and Pakistan ===
Friends of South Asia has been involved with several campaigns inside India and Pakistan, including opposition the 2002 Godhra riots, Pakistani military actions in Balochistan, Pakistan, and the 2006 bombings in Varanasi, India, as well as support for victims of the Bhopal disaster, advocacy for the civil rights of immigrants to the United States, support for the Right to Information movement, and the proposed expansion of reservations (quota-based affirmative action) in higher education for members of Indian castes defined as Other Backward Classes. FOSA has also specifically focused on highlighting art and activism linked to social change movements in Pakistan, including issues like peace with India, ending the Indo-Pak nuclear race, opposition to censorship and ending religious intolerance against the Ahmadiyya Muslim minority who have been victims of pogroms in Pakistan.

=== Bangladesh garment worker rights ===
Friends of South Asia organized and participated in protests against Walmart and Gap for buying clothes in Bangladesh. They claimed it is always a race to the bottom in garment industry: they give the contract to whoever produces the goods most cheaply, that vendors will be certain to take out their share, leaving very little for wages and improving workplace safety.

=== Campaign against FDI, for agrarian livelihood rights in India ===
Friends of South Asia has actively participated in a campaign to block foreign direct investment projects in India, and in support of traditional way of life and agrarian livelihoods. For example, activists of FOSA participated and co-authored a report on POSCO India, by forming a so-called Mining Zone Peoples’ Solidarity Group. This activism targeted to stop the $12 billion foreign direct investment by the South Korean company in the Indian state of Orissa. The co-authors of this report included others such as Biju Mathew and Balmurli Natrajan. In 2011, FOSA independently, as well as the front organization Mining Zone Peoples’ Solidarity Group, co-signed and submitted a letter to the prime minister of India asking that the POSCO project be cancelled.

=== California Hindu textbook controversy ===
Friends of South Asia was a prominent participant in the Californian Hindu textbook controversy, in which it joined a number of other groups in petitioning California's Curriculum Commission to reject allegedly revisionist edits to California's textbook curriculum on Hinduism and India, as suggested by two American Hindu organizations. In 2006, during the textbook controversy, then-graduate student Anupama Mandavilli was a primary spokesperson.

=== Condemnation of Indo-U.S. civil nuclear deal ===
The group advocates against what they term "militarism in India, Pakistan, and the United States." According to a 2006 statement, "We express our deepest disappointment with the recently concluded visit of George Bush to India and Pakistan, and unequivocally condemn the Indo-US nuke deal...The United States' imperial designs in its war on Afghanistan and Iraq and the submission of the Indian and Pakistani governments to go along, is not lost on their people who came out in thousands in both countries to protest against Bush and his agenda."

=== Condemnation of Israel ===
Friends of South Asia endorsed and sponsored speeches and signed letters denouncing Israel as a colonial occupier of Palestine. In 2010, it criticized novelist Amitav Ghosh for accepting the Dan David Prize from the president of Israel. In 2011, it endorsed a letter declaring Israel as a colonial occupier of Palestine.

=== Condemnation of United States policy in Cuba and Venezuela ===
Friends of South Asia has endorsed letters, protests and rally calling United States' policy in Venezuela and Cuba as hostile, the current governments in Venezuela and Cuba as progressive.

=== Literary events ===
The group holds an annual literary event in August, celebrating the Indian and Pakistani Independence days with readings in Hindi, Urdu, Punjabi, Kannada, Gujarati, and English. Topics have included "South Asian Writings on War and Terrorism," "Revisiting Changing Homelands," and "The Language of Food."

== Criticism ==
=== Corruption allegations against Benazir Bhutto ===
Former Pakistani prime minister Benazir Bhutto spoke at Stanford University in October 2001. According to the Stanford Report, "a handful of protesters who called themselves 'concerned Pakistani students' and 'friends of South Asia' held signs promoting peace and passed out fliers detailing corruption charges against Bhutto -- charges she disputed during her talk."

=== Cosponsorship of event with PAA ===
On May 15, 2005, FOSA organized a San Francisco march for peace in support of the 2005 India-Pakistan peace march, with the help of seven local co-sponsors, including the Pakistan American Alliance (PAA). About a week after the event, an anonymous online critic of the Association for India's Development pointed out that the Pakistan American Alliance's website included an image of a man holding a placard reading "Allah will destroy the terrorist state of India" at an October 2004 rally in New York City co-organized by the New York chapter of PAA. FOSA responded by deleting references to the Pakistan American Alliance from their website, and issuing an update stating that they were disturbed by the photo and had been unaware of PAA's politics, which were contrary to their own.

=== Ties to Communist Party of India ===
In 2006, Mihir Meghani, president of the Hindu American Foundation, itself strongly linked to the Hindutva Bharatiya Janata Party, was quoted in Silicon Valley newspaper Metroactive saying that "It's pretty well known that they're [FOSA] tied with the Communist Party in India...It's really a ploy to break down and dissemble [sic] Hinduism." In 2006, The Stanford Daily had to retract an article accusing FOSA of having communist ties, saying "FOSA does not have any ties to Communist or terrorist groups".

=== Controversy about speakers ===
Speakers hosted by Friends of South Asia have been the subject of controversy.

Biju Mathew and Stanford University

In 2006, FOSA invited Professor Biju Mathew (Rider University) to speak at Stanford University about labor organizing among New York City taxi drivers, globalization, and the anti-war movement. The Stanford Daily student newspaper ran an article critical of the planned event, based on an anonymous email claiming that there were simultaneous "Islamist and Communist sympathies within the organization." The anonymous correspondent also claimed that Mathew, a co-founder of the Forum of Indian Leftists (later renamed the Forum of Inquilabi [revolutionary] Leftists to be inclusive of non-Indian members), supported the Unabomber and other terrorist groups. The article received significant public criticism, and the Stanford Daily retracted the story. and printed apologies in the two subsequent issues, concluding that "FOSA does not have any ties to Communist or terrorist groups...We also apologize to Prof. Biju Mathew for associating him in any way with the Unabomber and other extremist elements."

Ghulam Nabi Fai and Kashmiri American Council

In 2003, FOSA invited and organized a forum speech that included Syed Ghulam Nabi Fai of Kashmiri American Council. Fai was arrested by United States' FBI in July 2011. According to U.S. court documents, Fai served as the director of the Kashmiri American Council, an NGO that held itself out to be run by Kashmiris, financed by Americans, and dedicated to raising the level of knowledge in the United States about the struggle of the Kashmiri people for self-determination. Contrary to public representations, Fai's Kashmiri American Council was secretly funded with millions of dollars by officials employed by the government of Pakistan, including the Inter-Services Intelligence Directorate (ISI), for several decades. Fai pleaded guilty in December 2011, and was sentenced to prison in 2012, for the crime of conspiracy to defraud the US by concealing transfer of funding from Government of Pakistan for his illegal lobbying efforts on Kashmir. There is no evidence that FOSA knew of Fai's Pakistan government's funding and connection, when it invited him as a key speaker in 2003.

=== Allegations of subversion ===
According to a 2007 article by Indian pilot and animal welfare activist V. Sundaram, the book NGOs, Subversive Activists and Foreign Funds- Anti-Nation Industry contains articles describing how FOSA and eight other groups are allegedly engaged in "anti-national activities" directed toward India, which are collectively labeled "Instruments of Hate and Fratricide."

== See also ==
- Californian Hindu textbook controversy
