= Pran Nath Thapar =

Chief of Army Staff, India

General Pran Nath Thapar
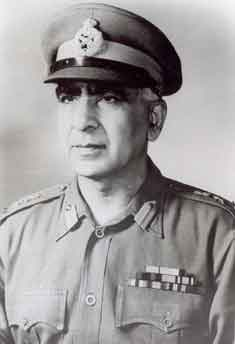

4th Chief of the Army Staff
- In office 8 May 1961 – 19 November 1962
- President: Rajendra Prasad; Sarvepalli Radhakrishnan
- Prime Minister: Jawaharlal Nehru
- Preceded by: General Kodendera Subayya Thimayya
- Succeeded by: General JN Chaudhuri

Indian Ambassador to Afghanistan
- In office August 1964 – 1 January 1969
- Prime Minister: Lal Bahadur Shastri; Gulzarilal Nanda; Indira Gandhi

Personal details
- Born: 8 May 1906 Lahore, Punjab, British India (now in Pakistan)
- Died: 23 January 1975 (aged 68) New Delhi, India
- Military career
- Spouse: Bimla Thapar
- Children: Karan Thapar (son)
- Relatives: Daya Ram Thapar (brother); Romesh Thapar (nephew); Romila Thapar (niece); Valmik Thapar (great-nephew)
- Allegiance: British India; India
- Branch: British Indian Army; Indian Army
- Service years: 1926 – 19 Nov 1962
- Rank: General
- Service number: IA-558
- Unit: 1st Punjab Regiment
- Commands: Chief of Army Staff; Western Army; Southern Army; 161st Indian Infantry Brigade; 1/1 Punjab
- Conflicts: World War II; Sino-Indian War

General Pran Nath Thapar (23 May 1906 – 23 June 1975) was the fourth Chief of Army Staff of the Indian Army. The Sino-Indian War was fought during his term, in which the Indian Army fared poorly. Thapar resigned during the last stages of the war, handing charge to Lt. Gen. J. N. Chaudhuri.

== Personal life ==
Thapar was born at Ahmedabad into a prominent Punjabi Khatri family. He was the youngest son of Diwan Bahadur Kunj Behari Thapar of Lahore. His elder brother was Daya Ram Thapar, an officer in the Indian Medical Service and later Director General Armed Forces Medical Services.

Thapar was distantly related to the Indian Prime Minister Jawaharlal Nehru through his wife. In March 1936, Thapar married Bimla Bashiram, the eldest daughter of Rai Bahadur Bashiram Sahgal and granddaughter of Rai Bahadur Ramsaran Das. Bimla Thapar was a sister of Gautam Sahgal, whose wife Nayantara Sahgal was a daughter of Vijayalakshmi Pandit and niece of Jawaharlal Nehru.

General Thapar and Smt. Bimla Thapar had four children, of whom the youngest is the journalist Karan Thapar. The historian Romila Thapar is his niece and the conservationist and tiger expert, Valmik Thapar is his great nephew.

== Career ==
After graduating from Government College, Lahore, he trained at the Royal Military College, Sandhurst, passing out on 4 February 1926 as a second lieutenant. He passed out in the same batch as K.S. Thimayya, who also went on to become Chief of the Army Staff. He spent the next year attached to a British Army battalion stationed in India. On 18 April 1927 he was formally appointed to the Indian Army, ranking as a second lieutenant. He did his regimental duties with the 2nd battalion, 1st Punjab Regiment for ten years and later attended the staff courses at Quetta in India and Minley Manor in England.

He served in Burma during the Second World War in 1941 and later in the Middle East and Italy. By October 1942 he was serving on the staff as a brigade major. He was appointed as assistant military secretary in 1945, and commanded the 1st Battalion of the 1st Punjab Regiment in Indonesia in 1946. Subsequently, he went on to serve as the commander of the 161 Indian Infantry Brigade in East Bengal. During the Partition of India, Thapar officiated as the Director of Military Operations and Intelligence.

In November 1947, he was promoted to the acting rank of major general. He served as the Chief of the General Staff for a few months and later as Military Secretary until August 1949. He was appointed Master General of the Ordnance on 8 August 1949.

On 1 January 1950, Thapar was promoted to substantive major-general, and was given command of an infantry division on 10 April. He commanded a division for four years until 1954 and was promoted to the local rank of lieutenant general in 1954 as Commander of a Corps. He was selected to attend the Imperial Defence College, London in 1955. After successful completion of the course, he was appointed General Officer Commanding-in-Chief, Southern Command on 21 January 1957, with the acting rank of lieutenant-general, and was promoted to the substantive rank on 1 February. He became General Officer Commanding-in-Chief of Western Command in 1959. Thapar took over as Chief of Army Staff of the Indian Army on 8 May 1961 and served until 19 November 1962, when he resigned from the army after the defeat by China in the Sino-Indian War of October and November. He was also colonel of the Rajputana Rifles.

== Later life ==
After resigning from the army, he was appointed Indian Ambassador to Afghanistan from August 1964 to January 1969. He died on his farm, White Gates, in Chhattarpur, New Delhi, on 23 June 1975 at the age of 69.

== Awards and decorations ==

General Service Medal 1947	Videsh Seva Medal	Indian Independence Medal	
1939–1945 Star	Burma Star	War Medal 1939–1945	India Service Medal

== Dates of rank ==
Insignia	Rank	Component	Date of rank
	Second Lieutenant	British Indian Army	4 February 1926
	Lieutenant	British Indian Army	4 May 1928.
	Captain	British Indian Army	4 February 1935
	Major	British Indian Army	1940 (acting); 1 January 1941 (temporary); 4 February 1943 (substantive)
	Lieutenant-Colonel	British Indian Army	20 August 1944 (acting); 20 November 1944 (temporary); 10 August 1946 (war-substantive)
	Brigadier	British Indian Army	2 November 1945 (acting); 10 August 1946 (temporary)
	Brigadier	Indian Army	15 August 1947 (Note: Upon independence in 1947, India became a Dominion within the British Commonwealth of Nations. As a result, the rank insignia of the British Army, incorporating the Tudor Crown and four-pointed Bath Star ("pip"), was retained, as George VI remained Commander-in-Chief of the Indian Armed Forces. After 26 January 1950, when India became a republic, the President of India became Commander-in-Chief, and the Ashoka Lion replaced the crown, with a five-pointed star being substituted for the "pip.")
	Major-General	Indian Army	18 November 1947 (acting); 1 January 1950 (substantive)
	Major-General	Indian Army	26 January 1950 (recommissioning and change in insignia)
	Lieutenant-General	Indian Army	1 September 1953 (local); 21 January 1957 (acting); 1 February 1957 (substantive)
	General (COAS)	Indian Army	8 May 1961

== Bibliography ==
- Hoffmann, Steven A. (1990), India and the China Crisis, University of California Press, ISBN 978-0-520-06537-6

Military offices
Preceded by Kodandera Subayya Thimayya	Chief of Army Staff; 1961–1962	Succeeded by Joyanto Nath Chaudhuri
Preceded by Kalwant Singh	General Officer Commanding-in-Chief Western Command; 1959–1961	Succeeded by Daulet Singh
Preceded by Kodandera Subayya Thimayya	General Officer Commanding-in-Chief Southern Command; 1957–1959	Succeeded by Joyanto Nath Chaudhuri
Diplomatic posts
Preceded by Not sure	Indian Ambassador to Afghanistan; 1964–1969	Succeeded by Not sure
