= Federation of Tamil Sangams of North America =

Non-profit organization

Federation of Tamil Sangams in North America
- Abbreviation: FeTNA
- Formation: 1987
- Type: Non-profit organization
- Region served: North America
- Official language: Tamil
- Website: fetna.org

The Federation of Tamil Sangams in North America (FeTNA) is a non-profit organization of Tamil organizations in the United States and Canada. It is a registered, non-profit, tax-exempt 501(c)(3) organization, founded in 1987 by five Tamil organizations: Tamil Association of Delaware Valley, Tamil Sangam of Washington & Baltimore, New York Tamil Sangam, Ilankai Tamil Sangam and Harrisburg Tamil Sangam. As of 2025, FeTNA represents 71 Tamil organizations based in America and Canada.

== Activities ==
=== Convention ===
FeTNA organizes an annual North American Tamil convention. Established in 1988, the conventions are held during the 4th of July weekend, in a different city every year. Conventions can attract over two thousand attendees from all over North America.

Invited guests typically include Tamil writers, actors, musicians, and politicians from a variety of political parties in India and Sri Lanka.

The annual conventions were held jointly with the Indian-American Tamil Nadu Foundation until 2002; the two groups have held separate conventions starting in 2003.

The 32nd convention was held along with World Tamil Conference from July 3–7, 2019 in Chicago.

Year	Location
1988	Broomall, Pennsylvania
1989	Washington, D.C.
1990	Staten Island, New York
1991	Hoffman Estates, Illinois (Chicago)
1992	College Park, Maryland
1993	Kenosha, Wisconsin (Chicago)
1994	Somerset, New Jersey
1995	Toledo, Ohio
1996	Stamford, Connecticut
1997	Pittsburgh, Pennsylvania
1998	Edwardsville, Illinois
1999	Atlantic City, New Jersey
2000	Tampa, Florida
2001	Southfield, Michigan
2002	University Park, Illinois (Chicago)
2003	Trenton, New Jersey
2004	Baltimore, Maryland
2005	Dallas, Texas
2006	New York, New York
2007	Raleigh, North Carolina
2008	Orlando, Florida
2009	Atlanta, Georgia
2010	Waterbury, Connecticut
2011	Charleston, South Carolina
2012	Baltimore, Maryland
2013	Toronto, Canada
2014	St. Louis, Missouri
2015	San Jose, California
2016	Trenton, New Jersey
2017	Minneapolis, Minnesota
2018	Frisco, Texas (Dallas)
2019	Schaumburg, Illinois (Chicago)
2020	Online
2021	Online (Atlanta, Georgia)
2022	New York City, New York
2023	Sacramento, California
2024	San Antonio, Texas
2025	Raleigh, North Carolina

=== Support for Tamil studies ===
FeTNA sponsors visits from two Tamil scholars to the United States each year; as of 2006, it had sponsored a total of 24 scholars. It has also been involved in the sponsorship of a Tamil Chair at the University of California, Berkeley and the Tamil Studies program at the University of Toronto.

=== Fundraising for disaster relief work ===
FeTNA plays an active role in fundraising for disaster relief work in response to crises like the 2004 Indian Ocean earthquake and the 2004 Kumbakonam school fire. In June 2005, the group reported that it had raised $37,965.79 for tsunami relief (disbursed through the Tamils Rehabilitation Organisation, the Tata Institute of Social Sciences, and Exnora International) and $16,020.43 for victims of the Kumbakonam school fire (disbursed through the Kumbakonam Lions Club).

== Organization ==
The Federation was founded in 1987 by five American Tamil sangams: Ilankai Tamil Sangam, Tamil Association of Delaware Valley, Tamil Sangam of Washington & Baltimore, New York Tamil Sangam and Harrisburg Tamil Sangam. As of May 2025, FeTNA's website links to the websites of the following member organizations:

Alabama Tamil Sangam, Arizona Tamil Sangam, Austin Tamizh Sangam, Bharathi Kalai Mandram, Boston Thamil Association, Canada Tamil Sangam, Canadian Tamil Congress, Carolina Tamil Sangam, Central Illinois Tamil Sangam, Chicago Tamil Sangam, Columbus Tamil Sangam, Connecticut Tamil Sangam, Dallas Tamil Manram, Greater Atlanta Tamil Sangam, Greater Charlotte Tamil Sangam, Greater Cincinnati Tamil Sangam, Greater Houston Tamil Sangam, Greater Milwaukee Tamil Sangam, Greater Portland Tamil Mandram, Harrisburg Area Tamil Sangam, Houston Tamil Studies Chair, Illankai Tamil Sangam of Chicago, Illanti Tamil Sangam USA Inc, Iowa Tamil Association, Jacksonville Tamil Mandram, Kansas City Tamil Sangam, Kentucky Tamil Sangam, Las Vegas Tamil Sangam, Metroplex Tamil Sangam, Michigan Tamil Sangam, Midsouth Tamil Sangam, Minnesota Tamil Sangam, National Council of Canadian Tamils, New England Tamil Sangam, New Jersey Tamil Peravai, New Jersey Tamil Sangam, New York Albany Tamil Sangam, New York Tamil Sangam, North Texas Tamil Sangam, Oklahoma Tamil Sangam, Ottawa Tamil Association, Panai Nilam Tamil Sangam, Pittsburgh Tamil Sangam, Rhode Island Tamil Sangam, Richmond Tamil Sangam, Sacramento Tamil Mandrum, San Antonio Tamil Sangam, San Francisco Bay Area Tamil Manram, Seattle Tamil Sangam, Tamil Association of Colorado, Tamil Association of Greater Delaware Valley, Tamil Eelam Society of Canada, Tamil Makkal Mandram, Tamil Sangam of Greater Washington, Tamil Sangam of Missouri, Tamil Sangam of Virginia Unc, Tamil Sneham, Tamils of Northern California, Tennessee Tamizh Sangam, The Tamils of Greater Rochester, Then Poovaga Tamil Sangam, TwinCities Tamil Association, Wisconsin Tamil Sangam, American Tamil Academy (Associate), Arkansas Tamil Sangam, Eastern Iowa Tamil Sangam, McLean County Tamil Sangam, Sastha Tamil Foundation (Associate), South Bay Tamil Sangam, Tampa Tamil Sangam, Triad Tamil Sangam, and the Utah Tamil Sangam

According to the FeTNA website, the cost of membership varies based on the size of constituent sangams. Each sangam appoints delegates to the governing board, with votes proportional to membership. Beside the governing board, the group has a President, Secretary, Treasurer, and Communications Director.

== Ethnic conflict in Sri Lanka ==
=== Public stances ===
The Federation publicly sides with the cause of ethnic Sri Lankan Tamils in the Sri Lankan Civil War. It has issued a number of statements calling for an end to Sri Lankan government violence against Tamils, the ability of Tamils to engage in meaningful negotiations with the government, and a peaceful political resolution to the conflict.

- 1995: Passed a resolution at annual convention, asking the US government not to sell arms to Sri Lanka, and calling for the US to pressure the Sri Lankan government and the LTTE to find a political resolution to the civil war
- 2005: Held the Sri Lankan government accountable for the death of Sri Lankan Tamil journalist Dharmaratnam Sivaram.
- 2005: Strongly condemned the murder of Joseph Pararajasingham, a Sri Lankan Tamil Member of Parliament
- 2006: Called for an end to extrajudicial killings by Sri Lankan government forces and paramilitaries.
- 2006: Supported a call for Sri Lanka-LTTE peace meetings, urged world leaders to pressure all parties to stop attacks on civilians, called for Sri Lankan military to withdraw from civilian homes and buildings, and called for sanctions to be initiated unless the Sri Lankan government disarmed paramilitaries
- 2006: Participated at a protest at the United Nations, condemning Sri Lankan state violence against Tamil civilians, asking for an investigation by the International Criminal Court, and calling for good faith negotiations between the Sri Lankan government and Sri Lankan Tamils

=== US civil rights lawsuits ===
The Federation's stated interest in doing cultural work in the "Tamil Eelam" region of Sri Lanka involved it with high-profile legal challenges against the Antiterrorism and Effective Death Penalty Act of 1996 (AEDPA) and the USA PATRIOT Act.

In 1997, Secretary of State Madeleine Albright designated the LTTE as a "foreign terrorist organization" under the terms of the AEDPA, which, according to TamilNet, "criminalizes the provision of material support or resources to the lawful and non-violent activities of any foreign organization designated as 'terrorist' by the Secretary of State." In 1998, FeTNA and seven other organizations joined the Center for Constitutional Rights in challenging the constitutionality of the AEDPA, which would make illegal FeTNA's attempts to do service around Tamil language, arts, and cultural institutions in the LTTE-occupied "Tamil Eelam" region of Sri Lanka. The United States Court of Appeals for the Ninth Circuit ruled against the plaintiffs.

The Center for Constitutional Rights and the Humanitarian Law Project took up a similar case challenging the AEDPA and the USA PATRIOT Act in 2003. In March 2004, Judge Audrey Collins enjoined the US Government from enforcing applicable sections of the USA Patriot Act against the plaintiffs; however, FeTNA was not covered by the ruling, because they did not provide the court with adequate details to prove that their proposed actions—doing cultural work in LTTE-occupied parts of Sri Lanka—would actually be in violation of the law.

=== Criticism ===
Some critics of the LTTE, consider FeTNA overly sympathetic toward or supportive of the group. FeTNA's public statements are primarily critical of human rights abuses attributed to the government of Sri Lanka.

A July 2003 Times of India article based only on a prior article in Sri Lankan paper The Island called FeTNA "one of LTTE's front organisations," and referred to the annual FeTNA convention as an LTTE fundraiser. (The Island in a 1999 Asian Human Rights Commission statement was called "a Sri Lankan newspaper well known for its racist propaganda.") The accusation appears not to have been repeated in subsequent media coverage, and mainstream Indian political figures (e.g. Indian President Abdul Kalam) have continued to participate in FeTNA events.

== Other political stances ==
=== California Hindu textbook controversy ===
FeTNA was actively involved in the Californian Hindu textbook controversy, in which it joined a number of other groups in successfully petitioning California's Curriculum Commission to reject allegedly revisionist edits to California's textbook curriculum on Hinduism and India, as suggested by the Hindu Education Foundation and the Vedic Foundation. FeTNA raised several specific objections about the proposed textbook revisions, which they felt sidelined the role of South Indian and Dravidian culture (history, language, and religious traditions), and allegedly "whitewashed" caste and gender discrimination in India.

Upon rejection by the Board of major proposed edits, a Thillai Kumaran, then President of FeTNA, dismissed the pending lawsuit by the Hindu organizations. "Threats of legal action are a clear sign of desperation on the part of the Sangh organizations; these organizations are perhaps not aware that the Board deals with dozens of lawsuits at any given time and cannot be cowed by such threats." Thillai Kumaran, a concerned parent, mentioned his lower-caste origins during his testimony, mentioned that his son, who attends middle school in California, did not feel insulted by the textbook's contents on Hinduism.

=== Support for caste-based reservations in India ===
In a statement FeTNA has supported caste-based reservation in India to 49.5% of the available seats in institutes of higher education and jobs. It has been critical of the demonstration again the proposed increased in reserved seats. The Tamil Nadu state of India already reserves 69% seats for specific castes.
