= Karan Thapar =

Indian journalist

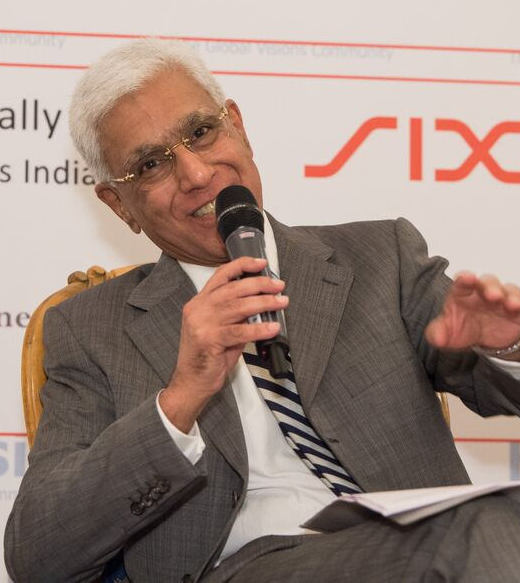
- Thapar in 2019
- Born: 5 November 1955 (age 70); Srinagar, Jammu and Kashmir, India
- Education: Pembroke College, Cambridge University (B.A.); St. Antony's College, Oxford University (Ph.D.)
- Occupations: Journalist, News presenter
- Employer: The Wire
- Notable credit(s): Devil's Advocate; India Tonight; The Last Word; Face to Face (BBC); Hardtalk India (BBC); To the Point
- Father: Pran Nath Thapar
- Relatives: Daya Ram Thapar (uncle); Romesh Thapar (cousin); Romila Thapar (cousin)

Karan Thapar (born 5 November 1955) is an Indian journalist, news presenter and interviewer working with The Wire. Thapar was associated with CNN-IBN and hosted The Devil's Advocate and The Last Word. Some of the celebrities he has interviewed included Jyoti Basu, Atal Bihari Vajpayee, Mamata Banerjee, J. Jayalalithaa, Buddhadeb Bhattacharjee, Narendra Modi and Shah Rukh Khan. He was also associated with India Today, hosted the shows To the Point and Nothing But The Truth and is doing an exclusive series of Interviews with The Wire on his show the Interview with Karan Thapar.

== Early life and education ==
Karan Thapar is the youngest child of former Chief of the Army Staff General Pran Nath Thapar and Bimla Thapar. The late journalist Romesh Thapar was his cousin, and Thapar is also a cousin to historian Romila Thapar.

Thapar is also related to the family of Prime Minister Jawaharlal Nehru. Nehru's niece, the writer Nayantara Sahgal, was married to Gautam Sahgal, brother of Bimla Thapar, his mother.

Thapar is an alumnus of The Doon School in Dehradun and Stowe School in England. While at Doon, Thapar was the editor-in-chief of the school magazine, The Doon School Weekly.

Thapar graduated with a degree in Economics and Political Philosophy from Pembroke College, Cambridge University, in 1977. In the same year, he was also the president of the Cambridge Union. After which he obtained a doctorate in International Relations from St. Antony's College, Oxford University.

== Career ==
He began his career in journalism with The Times in Lagos, Nigeria and later worked as their Lead Writer on the Indian subcontinent till 1981. In 1982 he joined London Weekend Television in the United Kingdom where he worked for the next 11 years. In London he was one of the co-presenters of Eastern Eye magazine program for South Asian minorities in UK. He moved to India in 1991 and worked with The Hindustan Times Television Group, Home TV and United Television before setting up his own production house in August 2001, Infotainment Television, which makes programmes for amongst others BBC, Miroshka, Doordarshan and Channel News Asia.

Thapar is noted for his aggressive interviews with leading politicians and celebrities. A few of his shows which have been much watched are Eyewitness, Tonight at 10, In Focus with Karan, Line of Fire, War of Words, Devil's Advocate and The Last Word. In 2004, Thapar famously interviewed late former Chief Minister of Tamil Nadu, J. Jayalalithaa. It ended with Jayalalithaa snapping at him and tossing the mic on the table, saying that "it wasn't a pleasure talking to you" and chose to leave with a "Namaste" not responding to his handshake. In 2007, Thapar also famously interviewed current Indian Prime Minister Narendra Modi (then the Chief Minister of Gujarat). A few minutes after the interview started, Thapar asked a few questions regarding the Modi administrations' actions during the 2002 Gujarat riots. Modi abruptly stopped the interview just three minutes in while saying "dosti bani rahe" (Hindustani for "Let [our] friendship remain [intact]") which became a popular internet meme. He later said that interviewing A. R. Rahman was the toughest in his career due to Rahman's shy nature.

In 2020–21, Thapar wrote a column As I see it in the daily newspaper The Asian Age. In August 2021, the management of The Asian Age objected to Thapar's regular column after he wrote about the '1947 Violence Against Jammu Muslims'. The violence against the Muslim residents of Jammu during the partition led to their mass displacement from the Jammu region. Thapar stopped writing for the column and said,

The 1947 violence against Jammu's Muslims that unfolded over a period of three-four months in 1947 is well-documented and has been historically accounted for. It is something that no one can contest. So I gather that the owners are under enormous pressure, presumably from Mr. Modi and Mr. Shah.

As of 2021, he is doing the regular show The Interview with Karan Thapar after joining The Wire.

=== Assam Police Summons Controversy (2024) ===
In November 2024, Karan Thapar was issued a summons by the Assam Police’s Crime Branch under Section 152 of the Bharatiya Nyaya Sanhita, which pertains to acts “endangering the sovereignty, unity and integrity of India.” The notice related to an interview published on The Wire’s YouTube channel, in which remarks made by a guest were alleged to have violated the provision.

== Awards and accolades ==
- In 1995 Thapar won the Onida Pinnacle Award for Best Current Affairs Presenter for the programme, The Chat Show.
- In December 2003, Thapar became the first person to win both awards in the current affairs category of the Asian Television Awards.
- The Best Current Affairs Program for an interview with Pakistan's Foreign Minister, Khurshid Kasuri tilted Court Martial
- Second award for 'The Best Current Affairs Presenter' for his popular long-running BBC series Face to Face.
- 'Best Current Affairs Presenter' award for his interview with Ram Jethmalani on Devil's Advocate
- In 2008 his show Devil's Advocate was conferred 'Best News/Current Affairs Show' by News Television Awards & Karan Thapar was presented the award for 'News Interviewer of the Year' at Indian News Broadcasting Awards.
- In April 2009, Thapar was conferred with the Ramnath Goenka Excellence in Journalism Award and was chosen the 'Journalist of the Year 2007 (Broadcast)'.
- In August 2009 he was adjudged the "News Show Host of the Year" by Indian News Broadcasting Awards.
- In March 2010 Devil's Advocate was accorded an award for being the "Best News Talk Show" by News Television Awards.
- In December 2010 he was adjudged the 'Best Current Affairs Presenter' by Asian Television Awards.
- In March 2011 Devil's Advocate was adjudged the "Best Current Affairs Programme" and Karan Thapar was declared the "TV News Anchor of the Year-English" by National Television Awards. In October 2013, Karan Thapar won journalism award.
- In December 2013, Karan Thapar received the International Press Institute-India Award for excellence in the field of journalism.

== Books ==
- Face To Face India - Conversations With Karan Thapar, Penguin, ISBN 0-14-303344-1
- Sunday Sentiments, Wisdom Tree, ISBN 81-8328-023-4
- More Salt Than Pepper - Dropping Anchor With Karan Thapar, HarperCollins, ISBN 978-81-7223-776-9
- Devil's Advocate: The Untold Story, HarperCollins, ISBN 978-93-5277-985-7
- As I Like It, Wisdom Tree, ISBN 8-183-28466-3
