= Daya Ram Thapar =

Indian Army medical officer (1894–1965)

Lieutenant General Daya Ram Thapar CIE, OBE
- Born: 6 April 1894: Lahore, Punjab Province, British India; (now in Pakistan)
- Died: 15 December 1965 (aged 71); New Delhi, India
- Children: Romesh Thapar; Romila Thapar
- Relatives: Pran Nath Thapar (brother); Valmik Thapar (grandson); Karan Thapar (nephew)
- Military career
- Allegiance: British India; India
- Branch: British Indian Army; Indian Army
- Service years: 1918–1954
- Rank: Lieutenant General
- Conflicts: World War I; World War II; Indo-Pakistan War of 1947

Daya Ram Thapar (6 April 1894 – 15 December 1965) was an Indian Army medical officer and Director-General of the Indian Armed Forces Medical Services.

== Early life and education ==
Thapar was born to a prominent Punjabi family in Lahore, where he received his early education, also studying at Government College Lahore. Entering the University of Edinburgh in 1911 for his medical studies, he graduated M.B.Ch.B. (Bachelor of Medicine and Bachelor of Surgery) in 1916. Later obtaining a diploma in tropical medicine and hygiene (DTM&H) from London and an M.D. (Doctor of Medicine) from Edinburgh with a thesis on ascariasis in 1930.

== Career ==
=== Early career ===
Whilst a student at Edinburgh, Thapar organised the Scottish Wing of the Indian Volunteers' Ambulance Corps following the outbreak of war in 1914. Holding the rank of volunteer sergeant-major, he recruited 120 Indian students into the corps, which provided dressers and interpreters to army medical units. He was commissioned in the Indian Medical Service (IMS) as a temporary lieutenant on 25 March 1918. He was promoted to temporary captain on 25 March 1919. He received a regular commission as a lieutenant in the IMS on 14 March 1920, and was promoted substantive captain on 25 March 1921 (with seniority in the IMS from that date).

Thapar was promoted to major on 25 September 1929, and was appointed a staff captain (medical) on 1 July 1936. He was promoted to lieutenant-colonel on 25 September 1937. On 14 October 1937, Thapar was posted to Peshawar as second-in-command of a hospital, and was appointed as the officiating Officer Commanding on 3 May 1938. He was posted to Rawalpindi on 15 June 1939 as Officer in Command of No. 1 Battalion Indian Hospital Corps.

Assigned as Officer Commanding Indian Hospital Corps at Kirkee on 22 October 1942, Thapar was promoted to acting colonel on 5 November 1942 and to temporary colonel on 5 May 1943, while serving as Commandant, Indian Army Medical Corps (IAMC) HQ at Pune. He was appointed a Companion of the Order of the Indian Empire (CIE) in the 1946 Birthday Honours list, having previously been appointed an Officer of the Order of the British Empire (OBE) in the 1942 New Year Honours. Thapar's final appointment prior to Indian independence was as deputy director of Medical Services, Medical Department. He was promoted to substantive colonel on 1 October 1946 (seniority from 25 September 1940).

=== Post-Independence ===
Following Independence in 1947, Thapar was promoted to major general on 3 September. On 1 January 1951, he was promoted to lieutenant general and appointed Director-General, Armed Forces Medical Services, with an ex-officio appointment as a member of the Medical Council of India. He retired in 1954, serving as Colonel Commandant of the Army Medical Corps until April 1956. He died at New Delhi in December 1965.

== Personal life ==
Thapar was the son of Dewan Bahadur Kunj Behari Thapar OBE; the future Chief of Staff of the Indian Army General Pran Nath Thapar was his younger brother. He was the father of journalist Romesh Thapar and the noted author and historian Romila Thapar.

== Publications ==
- Ascaris Infection among the Gurkhas (MD thesis), University of Edinburgh, 1930.
- Icons in Bronze: An Introduction to Indian Metal Images. London: Asia Publishing House, 1961.
- The Morale Builders: Forty Years with the Military Medical Services of India. London: Asia Publishing House, 1965. ISBN 978-021022603-2

Military offices
Preceded by K. S. Master	Director General Armed Forces Medical Services (India); 1950-1954	Succeeded by D. N. Chakravarti
