= Biju Mathew =

American writer and labor organizer

Biju Mathew is a New York-based labor organizer and intellectual. An immigrant from India, he teaches Information Systems and American studies at Rider University (New Jersey). He co-founded the New York Taxi Workers Alliance in 1998, is a founding secretary of the National Taxi Workers Alliance, and president of the International Alliance of App-Based Transport Workers. As a writer, Mathew has published several academic articles as well as the 2005 book Taxi!: Cabs and Capitalism in New York City.

== Immigrant/ Taxi Workers Organizing ==
In 1998, Mathew co-founded the New York Taxi Workers Alliance (NYTWA), along with Bhairavi Desai, Javaid Tariq, and several others. NYTWA is a labor union representing immigrant taxi drivers in the US with over 26,000 members in NYC. The union primarily organizes yellow medallion lease drivers and has conducted several successful campaigns. In 2004, 2006, and 2012, it conducted fair hike–lease cap campaigns. In 2013–14, it set up a health and wellness fund for NYC taxi drivers. Its best known campaign came in November 2021, when, after three years of direct action, including a 15-day Hunger Strike, NYTWA reached an agreement with the City of New York and Marblegate Asset Management to restructure medallion mortgages, thereby saving many workers from falling into irretrievable debt. The campaign was widely covered in the media, including a cover story in The Nation.

In 2011 the NYTWA and its sister organization, The Taxi Workers Alliance of Pennsylvania (TWAPA) became the founding affiliates of the National Taxi Workers Alliance (NTWA) of the AFL-CIO. The NTWA is the 57th chartered union of the AFL-CIO and the first new charter in over 50 years. The creation of NTWA is described as historic given its status as the first national union of independent contractor-workers. Mathew is presently the secretary of the NTWA.

In January 2020, Mathew co-founded the International Alliance of App Based Transport Workers (IIATW), along with delegates from 23 countries. Initially a member of the steering committee, he became president of IAATW in 2021.

== Political Education ==
Mathew has a long record of volunteer educational work. He is a co-founder and chair of the executive council of Lamakaan, an open cultural space in Hyderabad, India. He serves on the board of the Brecht Forum, NY. He is also the co-founder of Youth Solidarity Summer, a South Asian youth education summer camp.

== Transnational Solidarity Campaigns ==
For over three decades, Mathew has worked with various civil society groups to uphold human rights and monitor human rights violations in India. After the 2002 Gujarat riots, in which reports estimated that more than 2,000 people, mostly Muslims, were killed by Hindu nationalist mobs, Mathew and several others founded the Campaign to Stop Funding Hate (CSFH), which tracked over US$6,000,000 being funneled to the Hindutva movement in India. This work is documented in a report titled “The Foreign Exchange of Hate.” CSFH has also investigated and published a report, “Unmistakably Sangh,” on Hindutva student organizations in the US. In 2005, he helped found the Coalition Against Genocide (CAG), a coalition of 40 organizations focused on minority rights in India, particularly justice for the victims of the 2002 Gujarat riots.

Mathew is also the co-founder of the Mining Zone Peoples Solidarity Group (MZPSG), which works on solidarity campaigns supporting movements opposing indiscriminate mining and consequent displacement in India. MZPSG supported a campaign against the anti-Posco campaign in India. Its report documented inconsistencies in the claims of Posco India, the government of India, and the government of Orissa in justifying the US$12,000,000 Posco-India project.

In 2020, Mathew co-founded India Civil Watch International, a membership-based civil rights monitoring and campaign organization based out of North America, which has over 200 members as of 2024. ICWI has mounted campaigns addressing Facebook's role in the spread of hate speech on its India platforms, and advocating for the release of activists detained as part of the Bhima-Koregaon conspiracy, among others.

== Media and Publications ==
Mathew has authored numerous scholarly and journalistic publications on subjects ranging from labor to neoliberalism to communal violence. In 2005, he published Taxi! Cabs and Capitalism in New York City with The New Press. The book, which draws heavily on Mathew's interaction with drivers, details the taxi workers' struggles in New York City from the 1920s to the present and discusses New York politics and policies and their effects on the taxi industry. It received positive reviews in publications including the Financial Times and has been described as a classic. It was republished in a new edition by Cornell University Press in 2008.

Between 1999 and 2011, Mathew hosted a weekly radio show for the WBAI station titled "Global Movements, Urban Struggles." It featured discussions with activists focused on racial and economic justice around the world.
