= Seminar (magazine) =

- Founded: 1959
- Final issue: 2023
- Country: India
- Website: Official website

Seminar was an Indian magazine founded in 1959. Established by Romesh Thapar and Raj Thapar, it was published monthly. It was last issued in 2023.
