= 2016–17 California textbook controversy over South Asian topics =

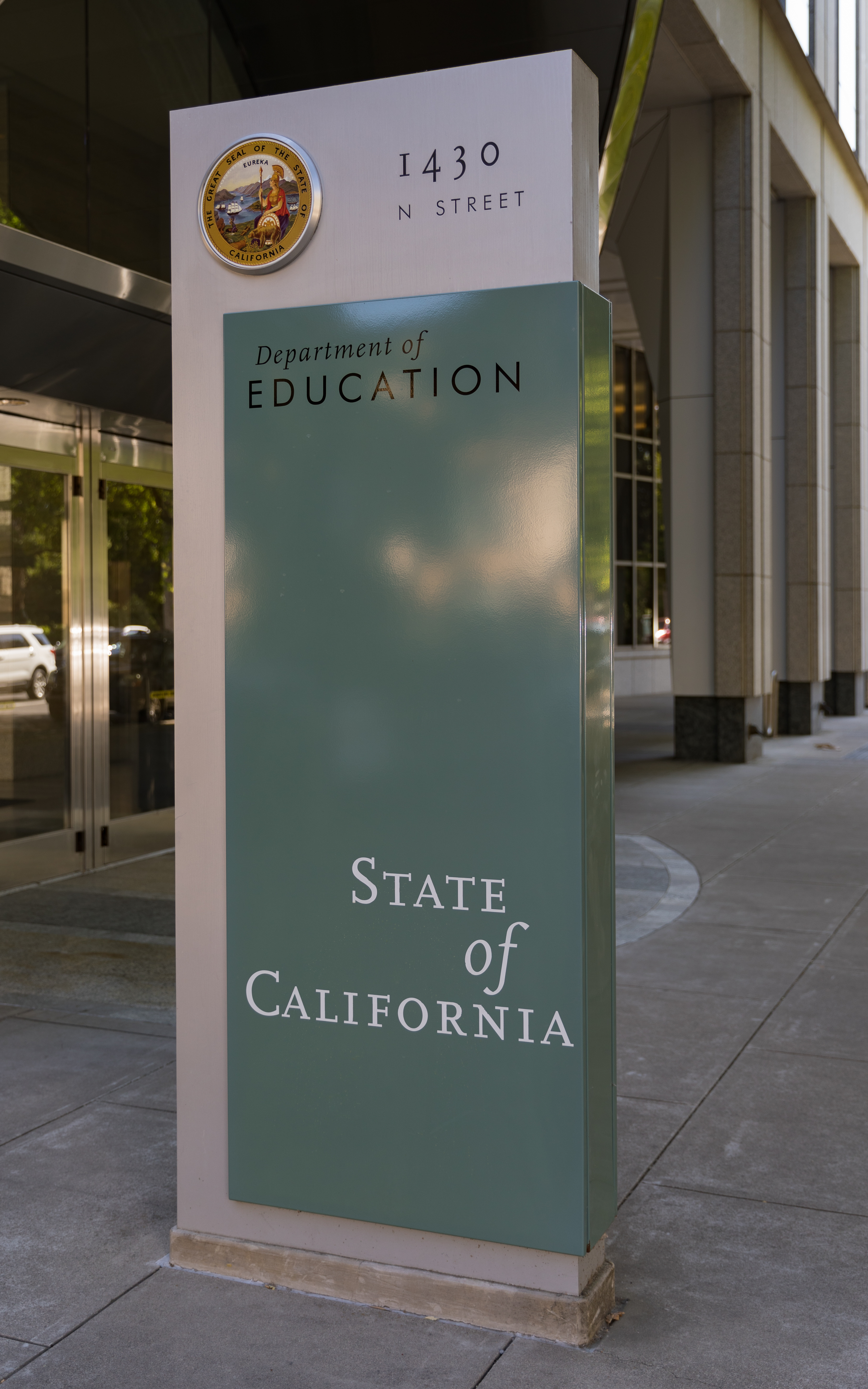
Sign in front of the California Department of Education in Sacramento, CA.

In 2016 and 2017, there was a significant debate on how topics related to South Asia were represented in California middle school textbooks—a follow-up to a related set of debates involving Hindu history that took place from 2005 to 2009. These new debates were fueled by varying religious groups who felt the 2009 changes were incorrect, or pushed political agendas. The California Department of Education runs a public process to update the history and social sciences curriculum frameworks, which help guide the textbooks that publishers develop for students. Starting in 2016, groups submitted textbook revisions dealing with a variety of issues related to histories of South Asia, India, Hinduism, Sikhism, Dalits, Muslims, Ravidassias, the Indus Valley civilization, and the rights of women, as taught in California 6th and 7th grade history and social science textbooks. The Department of Education made final decisions on the topics in 2017, retaining content on the caste system, and referring to all of historical South Asia as India, among many other decisions.

== Groups involved ==
=== The Hindu American Foundation ===
Since 2005, the Hindu American Foundation (HAF) has been involved in advocacy for changes within California textbooks. Over 2016-2017, they sent letters, joined petitions, and published articles, working towards a claimed goal of making educational content within California inclusive and accurate. In 2017, the HAF participated in the California Department of Education's textbook adoption process. Many academics and American Hindus who were critical of the HAF's involvement accused the organization of pushing Hindutva ideologies within their proposed changes.

=== Other advocacy groups ===
Another group was organized as "South Asian Histories for All", describing itself as an "inter-caste, multi-faith group of activists", which "cited inaccuracies regarding caste and other issues in the textbook material, and called for a delay on the books’ approval so that they could be submitted for further editing."

=== Academics ===
Academics also played an important role. There were two primary sets of academics providing comment on the issues:

- According to The Caravan, "Unified under the banner of the 'South Asian Faculty Group,' many professors signed a letter that detailed the reasons why many of the edits proposed by the Hindu groups were ahistorical and ideologically motivated. A similar letter, with over 90 signatories, was submitted this year, endorsing the specific edits requested by SAHFA."
- Opposing many of these edits, according to The Caravan, "The Hindu camp, too, assembled a team of academics...who submitted their own letter. It was written primarily by Jeffery Long, a professor of religion and Asian studies at Elizabethtown College...With almost 40 signatories, Long’s letter criticised some of the textbooks for their 'underlying Orientalist narrative' and their tendency to put forth 'inaccurate and unfavorable comparisons of Hinduism with other religions'."

== 2017 History-Social Science edits and corrections ==
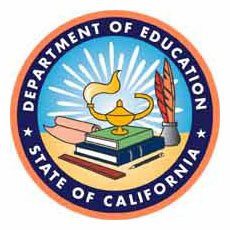
California Department of Education seal.

On September 28, 2017, the California Department of Education published a list of edits and corrections. Some, but not all, changes include:

2017 Changes And Corrections Grades 6-8
Original Text	Corrections	Reference/Int. Ref. Number
"Sikhism blends teachings from Islam and Hinduism."	"Sikhism preached a path that was both independent from Hinduism and Islam."	2
“Chandra Gupta I founds the Gupta Empire,”	“Chandragupta Maurya.”	3
“Sikhism in India,”	“Sikhism in South Asia.”	12
“While Guru Nanak was raised Hindu, Sikhs do not consider their religion a branch of Hinduism, though some have argued otherwise,”	“While Guru Nanak was raised Hindu, Sikhs do not consider their religion a branch of Hinduism.”	14
“However, some aspects of the caste system are still observed in two areas of Sikh society—marriage and some gurdwaras, or places of worship. Sikhs are expected to marry someone of their own caste. Some castes have also created gurdwaras for their caste only,”	“However, some aspects of the caste system are voluntarily observed in two areas of some Sikh societies—marriage and some gurdwaras, or places of worship. While not required, some Sikhs may choose to marry someone of their own caste. Some castes have also created gurdwaras.”	18
“These articles include a turban, a sword, a metal bracelet, and a wooden comb,”	“These articles include uncut hair, a religious sword, a metal bracelet, and a wooden comb."	19

== Dalits and the caste system ==
=== The debate ===
Advocates disagreed on whether and how the history of the caste system should be included in history books, and how Dalit communities should be named.

- The Uberoi Foundation recommended removing the word "Dalit", and the Hindu American Foundation proposed removing the word "Untouchable". The Hindu American Foundation asked for the erasure of references to caste and untouchability, asking that the phrase “communities outside the jati system, the 'Untouchables,'" be changed to "socially ostracized and economically disadvantaged communities". The Hindu Education Foundation opposed a suggested edit stating that Dalits were "forced to do work considered impure", writing “the suggested edit has political overtones".
- South Asian Histories for All and Dalit American groups argued for inclusion of the word "Dalit", and for retaining the history of the caste system in history textbooks.

=== The result ===
The proposal to rename "Untouchables" as "socially ostracized and economically disadvantaged communities" was rejected by the Instructional Quality Commission, and the use of the word Dalit was incorporated into the curriculum framework. Commission members also rejected a suggestion that would describe jati groups as "self-governing".

However, according to The Caravan, "the final textbook matches HAF’s suggested edits more closely than it does the framework text. For example, while the framework had described the Dalit community by name, the approved National Geographic textbook fails to do so. It notes, 'At the bottom were slaves, laborers, and artisans...Many centuries later, another group developed that was considered even lower'."

== Guru Nanak and caste ==
=== The debate ===
- Three Hindu groups, the Hindu American Foundation, the Hindu Education Foundation, and the Uberoi Foundation, all submitted edits that would remove references in the curriculum framework to Guru Nanak, the founder of Sikhism, being "a social reformer who challenged the authority of the Brahmins and the caste order."
- The Sikh Coalition argued the need to "highlight Guru Nanak Dev Ji’s belief in universal equality and the rejection of the caste system as a core tenet of Sikhism."

=== The result ===
After debate, the Sikh Coalition praised the final textbook curriculum for retaining the language. However, National Geographic, one of the publishers who developed a textbook based on the curriculum, dropped references to Nanak’s opposition to the caste system. Sikh groups pointed to a Hindu American Foundation employee credited in the textbook as a "reviewer of religious content". According to The Caravan, the Hindu American Foundation "affirmed that the foundation had worked directly with all the publishers except for Studies Weekly and McGraw Hill."

== Dalip Singh Saund and Sikhism ==
=== The debate ===
- In a suggested edit, the Hindu American Foundation asked for the removal of the word "Sikh" in descriptions of Dalip Singh Saund, describing him only as "an immigrant of Indian origin."
- This edit was opposed by Sikh American groups.

=== The result ===
The Instructional Quality Commission agreed to retain language naming Saund's Sikh identity.

== India and South Asia ==
=== The debate ===
- According to Scroll, the South Asia Faculty Group submitted edits asking for the word "India" to be replaced with "South Asia" in 24 of 93 instances where there were references to historical "India" in the curriculum framework. They argued that "certain parts referred to as ancient India are now in Afghanistan, Pakistan, or Bangladesh," according to a summary of their letter by Quartz.
- Groups like the Hindu American Foundation strongly opposed the use of the word "South Asia," and launched a "Don't Erase India" social media campaign. They were supported by a group of academics, "Scholars for People," who created an online petition that garnered over 25,000 signatures.

=== The result ===
The California Department of Education's Instructional Quality Commission eventually decided to use the word "India" in every instance within the curriculum framework.

== Indus Valley Civilization ==
=== The debate ===
- The Uberoi Foundation submitted edits changing every reference to the "Indus Valley Civilization" to the "Indus–Sarasvati civilization" in reference to the "Sarasvati River" from Hindu mythology.
- This was opposed by the South Asia Faculty Group and South Asian Histories for All.

=== The result ===
The Instructional Quality Commission rejected the edits, retaining the phrase "Indus Valley Civilization."

Subsequently, the textbook review panel flagged publisher Pearson's references to the "Sarasvati River," responding with comments like "This is a subject of controversy, not settled fact...Remove mention of ‘Sarasvati’ and refer to it as ‘Indus Valley civilization'". In response, a Pearson employee defended the usage, stating that the changes were requested by the Hindu American Foundation, the Hindu Education Foundation, and Hindupedia. The Instructional Quality Commission upheld the original request, and Pearson revised its textbook.

== Representation of Hindus ==
A coalition led by the Hindu American Foundation and other community groups that included nearly 40 academics, about 74 interfaith organizations and elected officials like Congresswoman Tulsi Gabbard and California State Senator Steve Glazer urged the California Board of Education to review the draft to ensure fair representation of Hinduism, Jainism and Indian culture. Dozens of Indian-American students spoke out against the South Asia Faculty Group's suggested edits, accusing them of Hinduphobia and robbing them of selfhood.

== See also ==
- California textbook controversy over Hindu history
- Hindutva pseudohistory
