= Jeffery D. Long =

American scholar of religious studies (born 1969)

Jeffery David Long is an American scholar of religious studies who works on the religions and philosophies of India, particularly Hinduism and Jainism. He is the Carl W. Zeigler Professor of Religion, Philosophy, and Asian Studies at Elizabethtown College.

== Education and career ==
Long graduated with a BA from the University of Notre Dame in 1991. He received his MA and PhD at the University of Chicago Divinity School in 1993 and 2000, respectively. His PhD thesis was titled Plurality and Relativity: Whitehead, Jainism, and the Reconstruction of Religious Pluralism. He began work at Elizabethtown College in 2000.

Long has authored, edited, or co-edited over a dozen books on Hinduism, Jainism, and related topics. He sometimes draws upon his personal identity as a Hindu and has argued in favor of promoting a "universalist" Hinduism, similar to "Buddhism, Christianity, or Islam". He has done some consulting, including for the Hindu American Foundation in the early 2000s.

== Activism ==
Long composed a letter in support of the stance of the Hindu American Foundation, an American non-profit organization, during its 2006 lawsuit against the California Board of Education. Long also wrote a letter stating that some textbooks include "inaccurate and unfavorable comparisons of Hinduism with other religions", as part of the 2016–17 California textbook controversy over South Asian topics. Long personally voiced "a far more moderate tone" than those groups who were leading that campaign against the textbooks.

== Awards and honors ==
In 2018, Long received the Hindu American Foundation's Dharma Seva Award "for his efforts to help mainstream Americans understand Hinduism in academia and public schools".

== Personal life ==
Long was raised in a Catholic household. When long was 12, his father died as the result of an accident. At the age of 25, Long became a Hindu.

== Books ==
- Long, Jeffery D. (January 23, 2007). A Vision for Hinduism: Beyond Hindu Nationalism. I.B.Tauris. ISBN 9781845112738.
- Long, Jeffery D. (2009). Jainism: An Introduction. I.B. Tauris. ISBN 978-1-4416-3839-7. OCLC 608555139.
- Long, Jeffery D. (2011). Historical Dictionary of Hinduism. Scarecrow Press. ISBN 978-0-8108-7960-7. 2nd ed. 2020, Scarecrow Press, ISBN 978-1-5381-2293-8.
- Long, Jeffery D. (2020). Hinduism in America: A Convergence of Worlds. Bloomsbury Publishing. ISBN 978-1-4742-4845-7. OCLC 1159617533.
- Long, Jeffery D. (2024). Discovering Indian Philosophy: An Introduction to Hindu, Jain, and Buddhist Thought. Bloomsbury Publishing. ISBN 978-1-3503-2482-4. OCLC 1411840731.
- Gupta, Ravi M.; Long, Jeffery D. (2025). Hinduism: The Primary Sources. Oxford University Press. ISBN 978-0-1909-2244-3. OCLC 1530788569.

=== Edited volumes ===
- Schweig, Graham M.; Long, Jeffery D.; Lamb, Ramdas; Deepak, Adarsh, eds. (2005). Asceticism, Identity, and Pedagogy in Dharma Traditions. A. Deepak Publications. ISBN 978-0-9371-9450-8.
- Long, Jeffery D., ed. (2019). Perspectives on Reincarnation: Christian, Hindu, and Scientific. MDPI. ISBN 978-3-0389-7535-9. OCLC 1089904229.
- Miller, Christopher Patrick; Reading, Michael; Long, Jeffery D., eds. (2019). Beacons of Dharma: Spiritual Exemplars for the Modern Age. Bloomsbury Publishing. ISBN 978-1-9787-5496-6.
- Long, Jeffery D.; Long, Michael G., eds. (2022). Nonviolence in the World's Religions: A Concise Introduction. Routledge. ISBN 978-0-3674-3957-6.
- Jain, Pankaj; Long, Jeffery D., eds. (2023). Indian and Western Philosophical Concepts in Religion. Bloomsbury Publishing. ISBN 978-1-7936-2315-7.
- Long, Jeffery D.; Rosen, Steven J., eds. (2024). Ahiṃsā in the Indic Traditions: Explorations and Reflections. Bloomsbury Publishing. ISBN 978-1-6669-6287-1.
- Mishra, Deepanjali; Long, Jeffery D., eds. (2024). A Pragmatic Approach to Religion and Sustainability. Springer. ISBN 978-3-0316-7359-7.
