= Nehru and Bose =

Book by Rudrangshu Mukherjee on the Nehru-Bose relationship

Nehru and Bose: Parallel Lives
- Author: Rudrangshu Mukherjee
- Language: English
- Genre: History
- Published: October 2014
- Publisher: Penguin
- Publication place: India
- ISBN: 9780143425656
- Website: https://penguin.co.in/book/nehru-and-bose/

Nehru and Bose: Parallel Lives is a non-fiction book written by Indian historian Rudrangshu Mukherjee on the relationship between two Indian nationalist freedom fighters Subhas Chandra Bose and Jawaharlal Nehru, the first prime minister of India. It covers both men's relationship with Gandhi, their activities in the nationalist movement, and their growing disagreements during the 1930s.

The book has been the subject of a positive review by K. A. R. Narasiah writing for The Hindu.
