= Forum of Indian Leftists =

The Forum of Indian Leftists (FOIL), or the Forum of Inquilabi Leftists, is a group of left-wing activists of Indian background. The organization describes itself as "a clearinghouse for radical Indian activists in the United States, Canada and England." Its purpose is described by its founders as "some place for us to share information, offer support, and encourage each other to write in the open media on issues pertaining to Indians overseas and India itself, and help build projects that make our radical politics more material."

== Founding and Mission ==
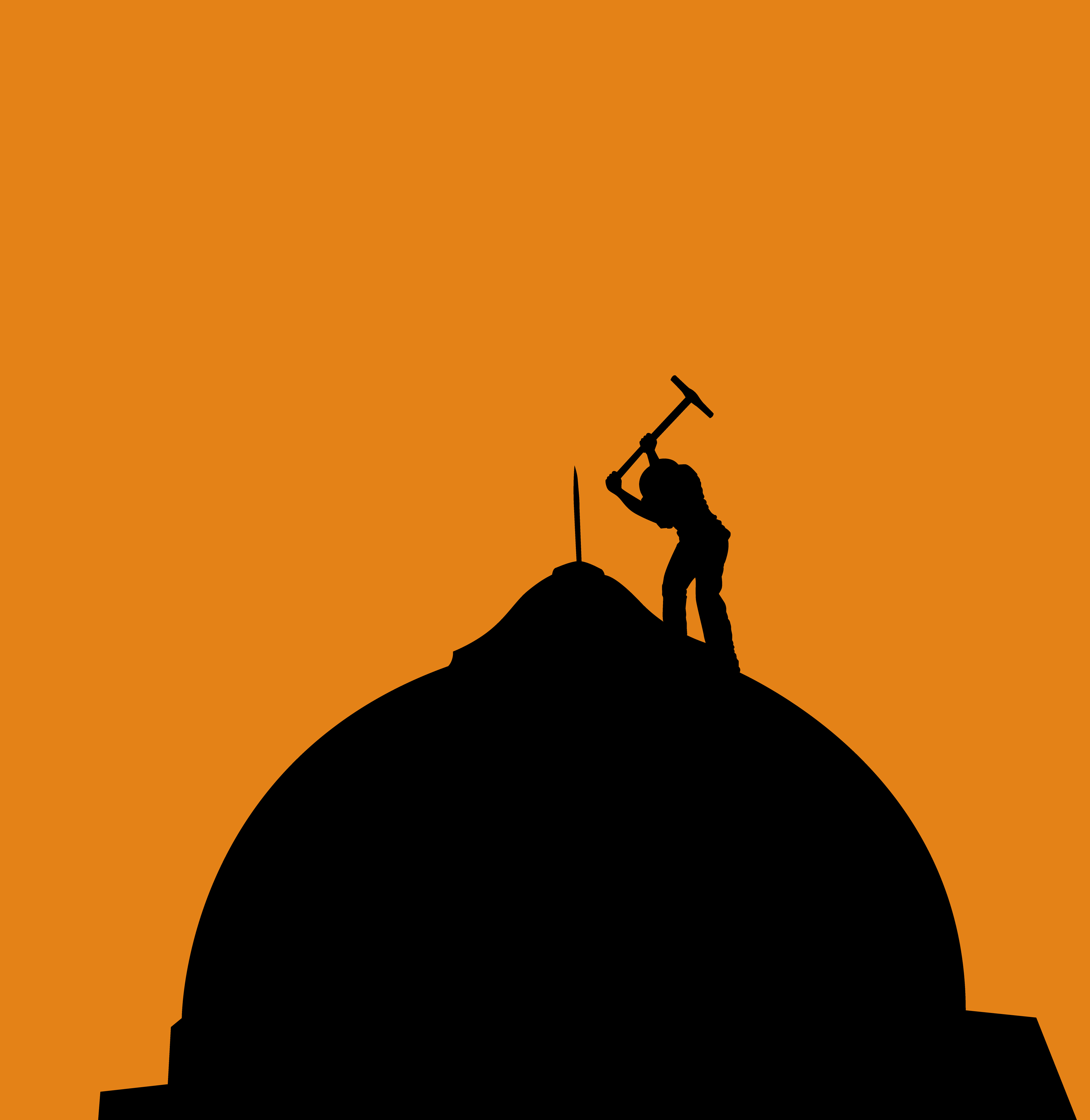
Babri Masjid was a mosque in Ayodhya, India at a site believed by Hindus to be the birthplace of Hindu deity Rama. It has been a focus of dispute between the Hindu and Muslim communities since the 18th century. The blame or the credit for the entire temple construction movement at Ayodhya is placed on the Sangh Parivar, a group in direct opposition with FOIL. The RSS has denied responsibility and questioned the objectivity of the report that was filed blaming them.

Two of the co-founders of FOIL are Biju Mathew and Vijay Prashad. In an interview from 2005, Biju Mathew describes the founding of FOIL to Yoginder Sikand. He claims, they started FOIL in 1995 following the destruction of the Babri Masjid in 1992.

"We felt it was crucial to reach out to Indian students on American campuses. Now, it has expanded beyond university students as well, and we have more than 400 people on our email discussion list. We also have a website devoted to discussion of issues relating to South Asia from a leftist perspective. Besides sending out regular information through the internet we also organise groups of activists to speak on American university campuses on South Asian issues, focusing particularly on communalism and so-called 'liberalisation' of the economy."

Similarly, Vijay Prashad, in an interview with Mark Nowak of Jacobin, claims that the goal of any Socialist movement, including FOIL, is to close the intellectual gap facilitated by capitalism and inequality between the intellectual and the people. This clearly shows FOIL's motives are rooted in promoting social harmony in India and more generally in South Asia and abroad.

Announcing a call to join FOIL in SAMAR, or the South Asian Magazine for Action and Reflection, in the Summer/Fall 1997 Issue, Mathew and Prashad discuss various projects that FOIL has developed and how the many FOIL projects are coordinated by different members spread across the US, Canada and UK. Indeed, through its "clearing house" model, FOIL has spawned several organizations and groups in North America, Europe and India.

=== Organizations ===
Mathew and Prashad also started the annual Youth Solidarity Summer Camp in New York. This was intended as a response to the summer camps organized for young Indians in America by the RSS, or the Rashtriya Swayamsevak Sangh. The purpose of these camps is to bring together young South Asian students to discuss a range of issues, including, but not only, communalism and religious tolerance. Almost 300 people have attended the camps and the networks that they have created has recently led to the setting up of a national youth organization called Chingari. Chingari serves as a movement to empower educated Indian youth and help them with job placement.

== Founders ==
=== Biju Mathew ===
Biju Mathew is an American Marxist activist. He is an Indian immigrant and a professor of the Business Administration department at Rider University. Mathew is also an organizer of New York Taxi Workers Alliance. He has published a book titled Taxi!: Cabs and Capitalism in New York City (The New Press). Biju Mathew is also a member of the Board of the Brecht Forum in NYC. Although the Brecht Forum closed in 2014, Mathew continues to spread his ideas through a radio show he co-hosts co-hosts called "Global Movements, Urban Struggles" on WBAI 99.5 FM (NYC). He has written extensively, spoken and organized around issues such as communalism, immigration, labor issues, and against the war. He lives in New York City.

=== Vijay Prashad ===
Vijay Prashad is an Indian historian and journalist born on 14 August 1967 in Kolkata, India. From 1996 to 2017, Prashad served as the George and Martha Kellner Chair in South Asian History and a professor of International Studies at Trinity College in Hartford, Connecticut. Prashad is the author of 25 books ranging in topics from South Asians in America to the future of communism in India. He has written numerous articles and papers on US imperialism and capitalist hegemony and impacts of this across the world. In one of his most popular pieces in The Nation, Prashad describes his vision of the progression and struggle towards Socialism. He argues that socialist forces typically have very good ideas, but no power. He asserts that without power, good ideas have little consequences and claims that socialists must not simply theorize but also organize. A prominent critic of leftists in the US, Mathew argued at a 2004 conference on Life After Capitalism that leftists in the United States are not as effective as they could be in situations where they win influence through community organizing, such as in local governments, because they often do not appreciate ideas originating from other parts of the world.

== IDRF controversy ==
On 20 November 2002 FOIL published a report, titled 'The Foreign Exchange of Hate IDRF and the American Funding of Hindutva', accusing the India Development and Relief Fund (IDRF), an organization which raised money in the United States, of funding hate. The report is described as a 'careful study and analysis of more than 150 pieces of documentary evidence, almost three-quarters of which are those published by the Rashtriya Swayamsevak Sangh or RSS.'

Separated into multiple parts, it begins by claiming the IDRF was supporting Hindutva, or the extremist Hindu ideology which has caused much of the violence between religious groups in India recently and has seen tremendous growth, much of which the RSS is responsible for, outside India over the last two decades. "The Foreign Exchange of Hate" asserts that the IDRF in fact has religious ties and serves as a major monetary sponsor for Hindutva organizations in India.

The authors of the report investigated the sending of money to Indian movements that participated in the attacks of Muslims in Gujarat, India in 2002. The report details donations to anti-Muslim organizations such as the RSS. In an interview in 2002, Mathew defined that he and the other FOIL members are in clear opposition to all forms of right-wing religious fundamentalist and obscurantist groups. Mathew states, "If there are petrodollars coming into India to fund radical Islamist groups, that needs to be investigated and stopped."

Consequently, the US State and Justice Departments added IDRF to the list of organizations being investigated for illicit donations and money laundering after carrying out investigations. After meeting the renowned Hindutva politician and the then Home Minister of India L. K. Advani, IDRF termed the report as misleading Marxist propaganda. They later published a report of their own responding to the charges leveled by FOIL.
