= Romesh Thapar =

Indian Marxist journalist (1922–1987)

Romesh Thapar (1922–1987) was an Indian journalist and political commentator. Affiliated with the Communist Party of India (Marxist), Thapar was the founder-editor of the monthly journal Seminar, published from New Delhi, India.

== Early life and background ==
Thapar was born in Lahore (now in Pakistan) to a Punjabi trading family of the Khatri caste. His father Daya Ram Thapar CIE, OBE (1894–1965) was an Indian Army medical officer. He was the brother of Romila Thapar, the historian. General Pran Nath Thapar, sometime Chief of Army Staff, was his paternal uncle (father's brother), and the journalist Karan Thapar is his paternal first cousin. Thapar was also related distantly to the family of Prime Minister Jawaharlal Nehru. Nehru's niece, the writer Nayantara Sahgal, was married to Gautam Sahgal, brother of Bimla Thapar, wife of Pran Nath Thapar.

Thapar's family acquired wealth by making their fortune in trade during World War I, as commission agents for the colonial British Indian Army. Thapar was therefore sent to England for his education. Fabian socialism, which was fashionable in the universities of England in the years between the two world wars, had a deep impact on Thapar at a young age. Starting as a socialist, Thapar developed into a Marxist over the years, and remained a member of the Communist Party of India (Marxist) until his death.

== Career ==
Thapar returned to India in the mid-1940s and took a job in Bombay as a journalist with The Times of India, while Frank Moraes was its editor. After a couple of years, Thapar used some of his family wealth to start an English language magazine of his own, named Cross Roads.

=== Seminar ===
On 1 September 1959, Thapar started Seminar as a monthly journal, with a fund of Rs 11,000. This time, he sought to establish a stable revenue model through subscribers and advertisers.

Seminar continues to be published from Malhotra building in Connaught Place, Delhi. The publication is brought out by Thapar's daughter Malvika Singh and her husband Tejbir Singh, who is the editor. In 2009, the publication celebrated its 50th anniversary.

=== Other party activities ===
During his years in Bombay, Thapar was associated with IPTA, the theatre wing of the CPM. He was involved in story formulation and script writing for their films inspired by communist ideology. He also acted in two Hindi film; Footpath (1953) directed by Zia Sarhadi and Merchant Ivory's debut film, The Householder (1963). Before the advent of television, he also did the commentary in the monthly news-reels produced by Films Division, which were shown in cinema halls prior to the screening of films.

=== Politics ===
Thapar and his wife grew especially close to Indira Gandhi through the 1960s and 1970s. Although he had known her earlier, it was after Nehru's death that Thapar became a part of the inner circle of then Prime Minister Indira Gandhi, along with politicians like Dinesh Singh. This connection brought Thapar significant clout in society and government, and numerous offices were showered on him as patronage. Thapar served at various times as director of the India International Centre, of the National Books Development Board, of the India Tourism Development Corporation (ITDC), and as vice-chairperson of the National Bal Bhavan, Delhi (1967–1974), all of which are government sinecures conferred on him by successive Congress party governments.

However, during the Emergency of 1975, Thapar was marginalized by the Gandhis (Indira and Sanjay) for not being "supportive" enough. With the loss of political clout, his social standing waned and he had to limit himself to journalism.

== Personal life ==
In 1945, Thapar married Raj Malhotra (1925–87), who also hailed from a Punjabi Khatri family of Lahore. The couple lived in a flat in Mafatlal Park, in the upmarket Breach Candy neighbourhood of Mumbai, and were notable mainly for being well-connected socialites. They had a son named Valmik and a daughter named Malavika.

Thapar's son, Valmik Thapar, is a prominent tiger conservationist. He is married to occasional actress Sanjana Kapoor, daughter of Bollywood actor Shashi Kapoor by his actress wife Jennifer Kendal, an Indian of British heritage. Valmik and Sanjana are the parents of a son, Hamir Thapar.

Thapar's daughter, Malavika Singh, who now runs the Seminar magazine, is married to Tejbir Singh, who edits the magazine. Tejbir Singh is the nephew of writer Khushwant Singh and grandson of the construction magnate Sir Sobha Singh. Malavika and Tejbir have a son, Jaisal Singh, who runs as many as five wildlife resorts (the "Sujan" chain of boutique properties) in Rajasthan. He is married to Anjali Anand, only child and heiress of Deep C. Anand, founder of the Anand group of companies which had a turnover of Rs. 61 billion in 2014–15. Anjali is being groomed to take over the business empire built by her father; she has also been instrumental in the meteoric expansion of her husband's wildlife resort venture. Jaisal and Anjali are the parents of twin boys born in 2012.

Raj Thapar died in 1987 of cancer, at the age of 61 in Delhi . Romesh Thapar died a few months later. A few years later, Raj Thapar's memoir, All These Years was completed, edited and published by her daughter Malvika Singh in 1991. It was based on her diary which she had kept over two decades.

== Bibliography ==
- Romesh Thapar (1948). Storm Over Hyderabad. Kutub Publishers.
- Romesh Thapar; M. K. Rajan (1951). Nehru's foreign policy.
- Romesh Thapar (1956). India in Transition. Current Book House.
- Romesh Thapar (1975). Book development in national communications and planning. UNESCO Regional Centre for Book Development in Asia.
- Romesh Thapar (1977). The Indian dimension: politics of continental development. Vikas. ISBN 978-0-7069-0538-0.
- Romesh Thapar (1978). Change and Conflict in India. Macmillan. ISBN 978-0-333-90205-9.
- Romesh Thapar (1978). The Waste and the Want: Thoughts on the Future. Orient Longman.
- Romesh Thapar (1981). An Indian Future. Allied Pub. ISBN 978-0-940500-89-1.
- Romesh Thapar (1984). Indira Gandhi: Some Thoughts on a Sixteen Year Reign. Thapar.
- Romesh Thapar (1986). These Troubled Times. Popular Prakashan. ISBN 978-0-86132-127-8.
- Raj Thapar (1991). All these years: a memoir. Seminar Publications. ISBN 978-0-14-016869-3.
