= International South Asia Forum =

Canadian think tank and magazine

International South Asia Forum (INSAF) is a Canada-based group that seeks to promote secularism, democracy, human rights and social justice. Their focus is in South Asian countries such as India, Pakistan, Bangladesh and Sri Lanka.

== Founding ==
INSAF was founded in 1999 at a conference held in Montreal, Canada, on September 4 and 5.

== Location ==
International South Asia Forum 254 Kensington Ave, Westmount, QC, Canada H3Z 2G6

== Publications ==
Two major publications

- Insaf bulletin.
- Ghadar ("Publication of the Inquilabi Leftists.")

== Personalities ==
The INSAF bulletin is edited by Daya Varma and Vinod Mubayi.
