= Valmik Thapar =

Indian conservationist (1952–2025)

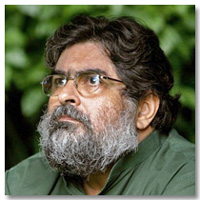
- Born: 1952; New Delhi, India
- Died: 31 May 2025 (aged 73); New Delhi, India
- Education: St. Stephen's College, Delhi (BA)
- Occupation: Wildlife documentary filmmaker; conservationist; natural historian
- Known for: Land of the Tiger (1997)
- Spouse: Sanjana Kapoor
- Children: Hamir Thapar
- Father: Romesh Thapar
- Relatives: Romila Thapar (aunt); Daya Ram Thapar (grandfather); Pran Nath Thapar (great-uncle)

Valmik Thapar (1952 – 31 May 2025) was an Indian naturalist, conservationist and writer. He was the author of 14 books and several articles, and was the producer of a range of programmes for television. He was one of India's most respected wildlife experts and conservationists, having produced and narrated documentaries on India's natural habitat for such media as the BBC, Animal Planet, Discovery and National Geographic.

== Early life ==
Valmik Thapar was born in Bombay (now Mumbai) to Raj Thapar, who founded the political journal Seminar in 1959, and Romesh Thapar, a noted journalist and political commentator. Noted Indian historian Romila Thapar is his aunt.

He married theatre personality Sanjana Kapoor and the couple had a son, Hamir. Valmik Thapar and his family lived in Delhi.

== Career ==
Valmik Thapar spent decades following the fortunes of India's tiger population. He was influenced by Fateh Singh Rathore.

His stewardship of the Ranthambore Foundation was recognised and he was appointed a member of the Tiger Task Force of 2005 by the Government of India. He criticised the majority Task Force view in his dissent note as excessively focussed on the prospects of co-existence of tigers and humans, which was, in his view not consistent with the objective of the panel.

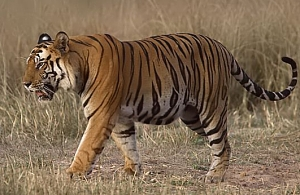
A tiger in India's Bandhavgarh reserve in 2006

His writings have analysed the perceived failure of Project Tiger, a conservation apparatus created in 1973 by the Government of India. He critiqued Project Tiger, drawing attention to its mismanagement by a forest bureaucracy that is largely not scientifically trained. His last book The Last Tiger (Oxford University Press) makes this case strongly.

Among the consistent criticisms levelled by Thapar at India's Ministry of Environment and Forests one relating to its unwillingness to curb poaching through armed patrols and its refusal to open forests to scholarly scientific enquiry.

His famous relationship with 'Macchli', a tigress, is documented in some of his chronicles. Thapar's most cherished tigers are highlighted in the BBC documentary film My Tiger Family.

In 2015, he joined the debate on the fate of T-24, who was identified as the tiger that killed four people, and was transferred from the wild to a zoo. Thapar considered the relocation to be the best option and made the area safer for forest guards and pilgrims.

== Death ==
Thapar was diagnosed with cancer in 2024, and died at his home in New Delhi, on 31 May 2025, at the age of 73.

== Selected television works ==
- Tiger Crisis (1994)
- Land of the Tiger (1997)
- Tigers' Fortress (2000)
- Danger in Tiger Paradise (2002)
- Search for Tigers (2003)
- My Tiger Family (2024)
- Legendary Tigers of India (2026; dedicated to Thapar's memory)

== Bibliography ==
Books by Valmik Thapar

1. With Tigers in the Wild, Vikas Publishing, Delhi
2. Tiger: Portrait of a Predator, Collins UK
3. Tigers: The Secret Life, Hamish Hamilton, Penguin, UK
4. The Tiger's Destiny, Kyle Ceathie, UK
5. The Land of the Tiger: A Natural History of the Indian Subcontinent, BBC Publishing, UK
6. The Secret Life of Tigers, Oxford University Press, Delhi
7. Tiger, Wayland, UK
8. Wild Tigers of Ranthambhore, Oxford University Press, India
9. Bridge of God: 20 Days in the Masai Mara, Private
10. The Cult of the Tiger, Oxford University Press, India
11. Tiger: The Ultimate Guide, Two Brothers Press, USA
12. The Last Tiger, Oxford University Press, India
13. The Illustrated Tigers of India, Oxfpord University Press, India
14. Ranthambhore: 10 Days in the Tiger Fortress, Oxford University Press, India
15. Tigers and the Banyan Tree, Private
16. An African Diary: 12 Days in Kenya's Magical Wilderness, Oxford University Press, India
17. The Tiger: Soul of India, Oxford University Press, India
18. Tigers, My Life: Ranthambhore and Beyond, Oxford University Press, India
19. My Life with Tigers: Ranthambhore and Beyond, Oxford University Press, India
20. Tigers in the Emerald Forest: Ranthambhore after the Monsoon, Oxford University Press, India Tiger Fire, Aleph Publishing, India
21. Tiger Fire: 500 Years of the Tigers in India, Aleph Publishing, India
22. Wild Fire: The Splendours of India's Animal Kingdom, Aleph Publishing, India
23. Winged Fire: A Celebration of Indian Birds, Aleph Publishing, India
24. Living with Tigers, Aleph Publishing, India
25. Serengeti Magic, Private
26. Serengeti Tales, Private
27. Saving Wild India: A Blueprint for Change, Aleph Publishing, India

Books co-authored by Valmik Thapar

1. With Tigers in the Wild with Fateh Singh Rathore and Tejbir Singh, Vikas Publishing, Delhi
2. Tigers and Tigerwallahs with Jim Corbett, Billy Arjan Singh, Geoffrey C. Ward and Diane Raines Ward, Oxford University Press, Delhi
3. Exotic Aliens with Romila Thapar and Yusuf Ansari, Aleph Publishing

Books edited by Valmik Thapar

1. Saving Wild Tigers, 1900–2000: The Essential Writings, Permanent Black, India
2. Battling for Survival, Oxford University Press, India
