= International Alliance of App-based Transport Workers =

Global trade union federation of app-based transport workers

IAATW
- Headquarters: Boundary House; Cricket Field Rd, Uxbridge UB8 1QG, UK
- Website: iaatw.org

The International Alliance of App-based Transport Workers (IAATW) is a network of trade unions organizing ridesharing and other gig transport workers.

== History ==
IAATW was founded in January 2020 during an international conference of app-based transport trade unions hosted by the UPHD which is now branded as App Drivers & Couriers Union, with financial support from the Open Society Foundations.

During the conference, organisers and drivers shared success stories and challenges, reflecting on the global nature of the gig economy as well as country specific challenges, like Proposition 22 in California.

In July 2020, IAATW together with the App Drivers and Couriers Union and NGO Worker Info Exchange started a campaign of supporting Uber drivers in filing legal complaints against the company for failing to provide access to their personal data.

In Uber BV v Aslam [2021] UKSC 5, the UK Supreme Court ruled in favour of IAATW-affiliated members App Drivers & Couriers Union that Uber drivers should be considered as workers. Afterwards, IAATW affiliates relaunched a similar case in South Africa and considered opening one in Nigeria.

== Affiliates ==
Affiliated unions include:

- Argentina: Union of Owners of App and Internet Drivers (UPCAAPI)
- Bangladesh: Dhaka Ride-Sharing Drivers Union (DRDU)
- Cambodia: Independent Democracy of Informal Economy Association (IDEA)
- Canada: Toronto Limousine Drivers Association (TLDA)
- Chile: Asociación Conductores Unidos de Aplicaciones (ACUA Chile)
- Costa Rica: Asociación Privada de Movilidad Tecnológica (APRIMOTEC)
- Colombia: Unión de Trabajadores de Plataformas Digitales de Colombia (UNIDAPP)
- France: National VTC Movement
- India: Indian Federation of App-based Transport Workers (IFAT)
- Panama: Association of Drivers of Digital and Similar Platforms (UNCOPLADIS)
- Nigeria: National Union of Professional App-Based Transport Workers (AUATON)
- South Africa: Western Cape E-hailing Association (WCEA)
- Sri Lanka: All Island Association to Protect the Rights of Taxi Owners and Drivers (AIPROD)
- United Kingdom: App Drivers and Couriers Union (ADCU)
- United States:
  - Chicago Rideshare Advocates
  - Connecticut Drivers United
  - New York Taxi Workers Alliance (NYTWA)
  - Philadelphia Drivers Union
  - Rideshare Drivers United (RDU)
- Uruguay: Asociación Conductores Uruguayos de Aplicaciones (ACUA)

== See also ==
- International Transport Workers' Federation
