= California textbook controversy over Hindu history =

In 2005–2006, a controversy took place concerning the portrayal of Hinduism in history textbooks in the U.S. state of California. The Texas-based Vedic Foundation (VF) and the Hindu Education Foundation (HEF) complained to California's Curriculum Commission, arguing that the coverage in sixth-grade history textbooks of Indian history and Hinduism was biased against Hinduism. Their points of contention included discussions of the caste system, the Indo-Aryan migrations, and the social status of women in ancient India.

The California Department of Education (CDE) initially sought to resolve the controversy by appointing Shiva Bajpai, professor emeritus at California State University Northridge, as a one-man committee to review revisions proposed by the groups. Bajpai, who was selected by the Vedic Foundation for the task, approved nearly all the changes. While presented by the VF as an independent scholar, it later came out that he was a member of a closely affiliated organization.

Michael Witzel, professor of Sanskrit at Harvard University, organized Indologists against the objections of Hindu groups, sending a letter with some 50 signatories to the CDE to protest changes of a "religious-political nature".

Witzel, Stanley Wolpert, and a third Indologist then revisited the proposed changes on behalf of the State Board of Education and suggested reverting some of the approved changes. According to the CDE, these scholars came to either an agreement or a compromise on the majority of the edits and corrections to the textbooks in 2006, with some proposed changes accepted and others rejected. In early 2006, the Hindu American Foundation sued the State Board over matters of process. The case was settled in 2009.

A follow-up debate on California textbooks took place from 2016 to 2017, dealing with some of the same topics.

== Background ==
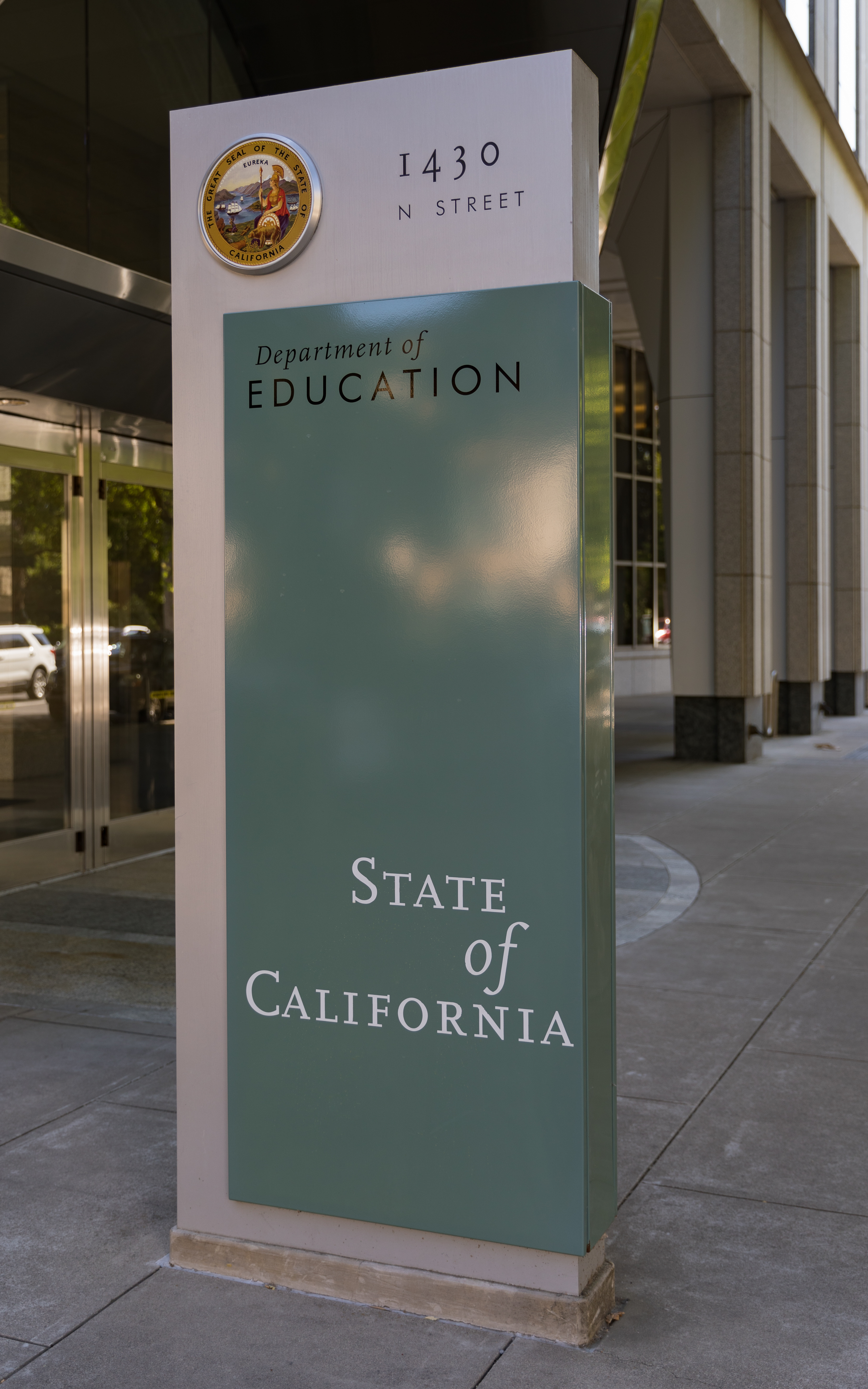
California Department of Education Sign

=== California textbooks' guiding principles ===
The California Standards for Evaluating Instructional Materials for Social Content contain the guiding principles for textbooks in public schools. Regarding topics of religion, these standards state: "The standards will be achieved by depicting, when appropriate, the diversity of religious beliefs held in the United States and California, as well as in other societies, without displaying bias toward or prejudice against any of those beliefs or religious beliefs in general."

They also say: "No religious belief or practice may be held up to ridicule and no religious group may be portrayed as inferior," and "Any explanation or description of a religious belief or practice should be presented in a manner that does not encourage or discourage belief or indoctrinate the student in any particular religious belief."

Textbooks are reviewed regularly in California, and civic organizations participate in the revision process. Christian, Jewish and Muslim groups have done this for years, but the 2005 review was the first time Hindu groups participated.

=== Response to draft textbook ===
Upon release of a draft of the textbook, Christian, Jewish, Islamic and the two Hindu groups submitted their edits in autumn 2005. After intensive scholarly discussions, over 500 changes proposed by Jewish and Christian groups and around 100 changes proposed by Muslims were accepted by the California Department of Education (CDE) and the State Board of Education (SBE); these scholarly discussions extended to January 6, 2006. Some 170 edits proposed by two Hindu foundations were initially accepted, supported by the reviewer appointed by California's Board of Education, Shiva Bajpai, who was a professor emeritus of history at California State University Northridge. However, 58 of the proposed edits by Hindu groups were challenged by various parties, including Michael Witzel of Harvard University. The challenge created a procedural and legal conflict.

=== Accepted changes ===
According to the State Board of California, some accepted changes were:

Accepted edits and corrections
Proposed Edit/Correction (by Hindu groups)	Ad hoc committee action	Final SBE/CDE recommendation Prof Bajpai and Prof. Witzel	Reference
Original textbook draft: "The monkey king Hanuman loved Rama so much that it is said that he is present every time the Ramayana is told. So look around—see any monkeys?" Proposed correction: Delete "The monkey king" from the first sentence, and the entirety of the second sentence.	Approve edit as written.	Confirm Ad Hoc action.	
Original textbook draft: On page 149, a mosque was shown inside text about Hinduism. Proposed correction: Replace photograph with one having a temple in the background. This photo is of a mosque.	Replace photo or crop out the mosque in the background.	Remove the picture.	
Original textbook draft: "Hindus believed ... dharma of their class, society would be in harmony." Proposed correction: Replace class with varna.	Approve edit as written.	Confirm Ad Hoc action.	
Original textbook draft: "A group of people known as the Indo-Aryans arrived in the Indus Valley about 1500 B.C. These people developed a social structure called a caste system." Proposed correction: Add a sentence informing students that there is a lot of controversy concerning the category of people known as "Indo-Aryans" and their origin.	Approve edit as written.	Confirm Ad Hoc action. Add sentence, "There is controversy concerning the category of people known as the Indo- Aryans and their origins."	
Original textbook draft: A picture showed a Muslim offering prayer, was wrongly captioned as "A Brahman"; Proposed correction: Replace picture, then correct caption to "A Brahmin."	If the picture indeed depicts a Muslim, replace the illustration with an appropriate picture of a Brahmin.	Confirm Ad Hoc action. Publisher should replace the illustration.	

=== Opposed changes ===
According to the State Board of California, some opposed changes were:

Rejected edits and corrections
Proposed Edit/Correction (by Hindu groups)	Ad hoc committee action	Final SBE/CDE recommendation Prof Bajpai and Prof. Witzel	Reference
Original textbook draft: "Men had many more rights than women." Proposed correction: "Men had different duties (dharma) as well as rights than women. Many women were among the sages to whom the Vedas were revealed."	Approve edit as written.	Defer to the original text.	
Original textbook draft: "Once their society had merged with the local population, a late hymn of the Rig Veda described the four castes." Proposed correction: Replace with, "A late hymn of the Rig Veda describes the interrelationship and interdependence of the four social classes."	Approve edit as written.	Defer to the original text.	
Original textbook draft: A table was titled, "The Caste System"; Proposed correction: Replace table header with, "The Varnas".	Approve edit as written.	Replace "Caste" with "Class".	
Original textbook draft: "... you'll learn about dharma and the other basic Hindu beliefs: Brahman, multiple gods, karma, and samsara." Proposed correction: Replace with "... Hindu beliefs: Bhagwan, Forms of God, karma and maya."	CDE: are Bhagwan and maya explained in the text? If group's edit introduces new terminology without context, this may be confusing for students.	Defer to the original text.	
Original textbook draft: "Around 1500 B.C.E., invaders called Aryans conquered northern India."; Proposed correction: Replace with, "Around 1500 B.C.E., invaders called Aryans came to northern India."	Publisher is directed to add a clarifying note that the "Aryan invasion theory" has been contradicted by scholarly evidence.	Change to, "In the second millennium B.C.E., invaders called Aryans came to northern India."	

=== Claimants ===
Both the Vedic Foundation (VF) and the American Hindu Education Foundation (HEF) are ideologically aligned with the Hindutva (Hindu nationalism) movement in India, specifically the Rashtriya Swayamsevak Sangh (RSS) and the Vishva Hindu Parishad (VHP). The HEF operates under the auspices of the Hindu Swayamsevak Sangh, which professes adherence to the RSS's ideological principles; the VF does not claim affiliation with other groups but cooperates closely with the VHP. Legal services for the textbook case were provided by the Hindu American Foundation. Jeffery Long wrote a letter supporting the Hindu American Foundation position.

== Scholarly and community opposition to proposed edits ==
California's Curriculum Commission endorsed most of the changes pushed by Hindu groups, moving the matter along to the state Board of Education, which usually follows its advice. However, a strong objection to such changes arrived from a group of U.S. scholars, led by Michael Witzel, the Wales Professor of Sanskrit at Harvard University. Witzel, along with his colleague Steve Farmer, was informed about the edits proposed by VF and HEF by a person claiming to be a graduate student of Indian origin at a California university. Witzel wrote a letter to the California Board of Education protesting the changes. He suggested that the matter be discussed publicly, and that professional advice be taken by the Board. The letter was supported by the signatures of 47 academics in the field of Asian Studies from various countries.

Dan Golden of The Wall Street Journal described the effort of the two Hindu foundations as similar to those by Jewish, Islamic and Christian foundations. Each group, claims Golden, vies for changes in texts for elementary and secondary schools to cast their faiths in a better light or in a sensitive manner before children. In the case of Hindu groups, the Wall Street Journal article described part of the motivation and response to be:

Some Hindu students say they're humiliated in school because texts dwell on customs such as ostracism of untouchables and an old tradition, rarely observed today, of "sati" – widows immolating themselves on their husbands' funeral pyres. Trisha Pasricha, a high-school junior in a Houston suburb, says she used to deny being Hindu to classmates because she was tired of refuting stereotypes perpetuated by textbooks and teachers. "The textbooks bring up all these obscure practices, like bride burning, and act like they happen every day," she says.

...

(On December 2) the Curriculum Commission voted to support most of the changes sought by the Hindu foundations. "We have to err on the side of sensitivity toward religion," a commission member, Stan Metzenberg, said at the time. The game wasn't over. Other Hindu groups – including members of the "untouchables" caste – entered the fray on Mr. Witzel's behalf. The Dalit Freedom Network, an advocacy group for untouchables, wrote to the education board that the proposed Vedic and Hindu Education Foundation changes reflect "a view of Indian history that softens ... the violent truth of caste-based discrimination in India ... Do not allow politically-minded revisionists to change Indian history.

— Dan Golden

In addition to this foundation, other organizations took up the matter. The president of the Dalit Freedom Network at the time was Joseph D'souza. D'souza was also the president of the All India Christian Council. D'souza wrote a letter to the Board of Education on behalf of the Dalit Freedom Network. According to the Friends of South Asia (FOSA), further letters of support came from other organizations, such as the National Campaign on Dalit Human Rights, the Dalit Shakti Kendra, and the Dalit Solidarity Forum in the USA. FOSA also writes that further Dalit groups testified before the SBE in January and February 2006, and are on public record in California, including those with Buddhist backgrounds, such as the Ambedkar Centre for Justice and Peace, Indian Buddhist Association of America, New Republic India, as well as Californian Dalit Sikh temples such as the Guru Ravi Dass Gurdwara.

The edits proposed by the VF and HEF were also opposed by a group of organizations that included the FOSA, the Coalition against Communalism (CAC), the Federation of Tamil Sangams in North America, Non Resident Indians for a Secular and Harmonious India (NRI-SAHI), the Vaishnava Center for Enlightenment, and the Indian American Public Education Advisory Council (IPAC).

Forty-seven professional South Asian scholars from universities foreign and domestic and some major American Departments of South Asian Studies as well as some 150 Indian American professors signed the original letter of opposition to the proposals of the two Foundations. Seventeen members of the California Legislature wrote a letter of support for the scholars.

Soon after Witzel's intervention, Viji Sundaram, a reporter for India-West, wrote that the scholarly consensus behind Witzel's petition was likely to have influenced the Board of Education's decision to review the changes suggested by the Hindu groups. Another reporter, Rachel McMurdie of the Milpitas Post, the largest newspaper publisher in the San Francisco Bay Area, pointed out the parentage and close links between the VF and HEF and the Rashtriya Swayamsevak Sangh as well as the Hindu Swayamsevak Sangh, the American branch of the Indian organization RSS.

== The State Board of Education decision ==
After extensive further discussion of the Jewish, Christian, Muslim and Hindu edits by specialized scholars on January 6, 2006, and after several public SBE meetings, a decision was reached on February 27, 2006. After listening to 3 hours of public comment and after receiving 1500 pages of written comment, a five-member panel of the Board recommended acceptance of the actions on the edits proposed by the staff of the California Department of Education (CDE). The panel approved some 70 changes, but it rejected proposed major revisions from VF and HEF on monotheism, women's rights, the caste system and migration theories.

On March 8, 2006, the full board agreed with the panel's decision, voting (nine to zero, two abstentions) to reaffirm only the changes approved on February 27, and to overturn the rest of the changes suggested by the HEF and VF, with two exceptions: the Aryan Migration Theory would be mentioned as "disputed", and the Vedas would be referred to as sacred texts, rather than songs or poems. Most parties expressed qualified satisfaction with the decision; however, the Hindu American Foundation (HAF), which had not participated in the revisions, threatened the board with a lawsuit.

Ruth Green, past president of the SBE, said that the ruling "represents our best efforts. Many ideological fault lines have played out here. These beliefs are deeply held."

A public relations firm hired by the VF and the HEF stated that, "What is at stake here is the embarrassment and humiliation that these Hindu children (in America) continue to face because of the way textbooks portray their faith and culture." Janeshwari Devi of VF said that "The two foundations submitted about 500 proposed changes, and more than 80 percent were not approved." This refers to the initial changes proposed by VF that envisioned the complete rewriting of chapters, which is not allowed per California procedures.

== Lawsuits ==
=== CAPEEM case ===
The California Parents for Equalization of Educational Materials (CAPEEM), a group founded specifically for the California schoolbook case after SBE's March 8 decision, filed the first lawsuit in Federal Court in Sacramento on March 14. The complaint was filed by Venkat Balasubramani, a Seattle attorney, who has worked in the past with public interest groups such as the ACLU. Michael Newdow, an atheist attorney who is known for filing cases related to the deletion of the word 'God' from the Pledge of Allegiance, later joined CAPEEM's legal team.

The Court subsequently removed CDE and SBE as defendants. However, Judge Frank C. Damrell of the U.S. District Court in the Eastern District of California allowed CAPEEM to amend the complaint on August 11/September 28, 2006, and proceed against individual members of SBE and CDE.

The case then proceeded with the discovery phase, and CAPEEM requested documents from the SBE and CDE, and issued subpoenas to various persons involved in this case, including CDE officials, SBE, publishers, Christian groups such as the Dalit Freedom Network, the Council on Islamic Education, Curriculum Commission member Charles Munger, Jr., and the review committee members Stanley Wolpert, James Heitzman and Michael Witzel.

Among other subpoenas, CAPEEM issued a subpoena to Witzel to support their March 2006 lawsuit against members of CBE/SBE. Witzel turned over several CDs containing emails, but CAPEEM followed up with a motion to compel him to deliver additional documents. During a hearing in Massachusetts District Court on July 3, 2007, the court granted Witzel's motion for a protective order and denied CAPEEM's motion to compel "because it sought documents and communications that were not relevant and, therefore, not discoverable". CAPEEM appealed that ruling. On July 7, 2008, it was denied by a three-judge panel of the U.S. Court of Appeals for the First Circuit.

CAPEEM's subpoena to Witzel also resulted in Witzel's deposition, at which his lawyer sought an agreement from CAPEEM that it would not publicize the deposition transcript. CAPEEM agreed to the request.

On February 25, 2009, the California Federal Court ruled that CAPEEM's claim was viable with respect to the actual process of adoption but denied CAPEEM's motion for partial summary judgment with respect to the Establishment Clause as it lacked standing, and partly granted and partly denied the SBE members' motion.

Case 2:06-cv-00532-FCD-KJM, Document 212, was filed on February 26, 2009. On June 2, 2009, the Court ruled that good cause having been shown, and pursuant to Federal Rule of Civil Procedure, it accepted the Plaintiff's and Defendant's Settlement and General Release Agreement. Concurrently, the Attorney General of California reached a settlement with CAPEEM where CAPEEM received $175,000 from SBE, and both parties agreed to release each other from all claims and to not appeal.

=== Hindu American Foundation case ===
A second lawsuit was filed by the Hindu American Foundation in March 2006 against the SBE over the procedures used for reviewing the textbooks. HAF contended that the procedures did not satisfy the applicable laws. The HAF also sought a temporary injunction against the publication of the textbooks, which was denied by the judge.

Given the gravity of the charges and the potential disruption to the state textbooks, the court moved expeditiously and made its ruling in September 2006. Regarding the HAF claim that the SBE failed "in some instances" to follow the State laws regarding public meetings, the court agreed and directed the board to update its procedures. However, the court did not find these "deficiencies in the regulatory framework" of the Board egregious enough to warrant the withdrawal of the textbooks. The procedures could be corrected while "maintaining the current [adoption] system".

After addressing the procedural allegations, the court turned its attention to the claim that the textbooks did not "conform to the applicable legal standards". The HAF claimed that the textbooks "portray[ed] the Hindu religion in their discussion of the history, culture and religious traditions of ancient India in a negative light". It also claimed that "the texts contain[ed] factual inaccuracies and [were] generally ... not neutral". However, the court ruled that "the challenged texts comply with the applicable legal standards". It said that the portrayal of the Aryan invasion or migration was not grossly inaccurate; the treatment of Hinduism in the textbooks did not violate the standard set by the state; and it said that the caste system, being a historical reality, had to be discussed even if it created a certain negative reaction in students. The contested textbooks, providing discussion and justification of the most contended issues (women's rights, dalits, Aryan invasion or migration, Hinduism as a monotheistic religion) stayed. Subsequent to the ruling, the HAF and the SBE reached a settlement, whereby the Board agreed to pay part of the legal expenses incurred by the HAF. Both the HAF and the opposing groups claimed victory.

Educationist LaSpina comments that the lawsuits were filed after the State Board made "extraordinary efforts" to reach a compromise with the Hindu groups. The HAF did not regard the adopted changes as sufficient. LaSpina recommends that the educators need to become "prudently aware" of the Hindu-American community's concerns over the portrayal of their history, religion and culture.

== Aftermath ==
In 2014, California State Senate majority leader Ellen Corbett spearheaded a bill (SB 1057) in the state legislature calling for a complete overhaul of its history and social studies curriculum to accurately portray Hinduism and other religions. The bill passed through both houses of the legislature with unanimous support. However, it was vetoed by the governor, Jerry Brown, ostensibly because it would slow down the curriculum revision process then underway. Corbett called it a "temporary setback".

== See also ==
- 2016–17 California textbook controversy over South Asian topics
- Anti-bias curriculum
- Hindutva pseudohistory
- NCERT textbook controversies
- Kitzmiller v. Dover Area School District

== Bibliography ==
- Bose, Purnima (2008), "Hindutva Abroad: The California Textbook Controversy" (PDF), The Global South, 2 (1): 11–34, doi:10.2979/GSO.2008.2.1.11, JSTOR 40339280, S2CID 145295643
- Jaffrelot, Christophe (2007), "The Diaspora and Hindu Nationalism", Hindu Nationalism – A Reader, Princeton University Press, pp. 361–369, ISBN 978-0-691-13097-2
- Kurien, Prema (2007), A Place at the Multicultural Table: The Development of an American Hinduism, Rutgers University Press, pp. 204–206, ISBN 978-0-8135-4161-7
- LaSpina, James Andrew (2007), "A Clash of Chariots: The Hindu American Challenge to California's 6th Grade World History Textbooks", Social Studies Review, 47 (1): 46–49, ISSN 1056-6325, ProQuest 199573158
- Padmanabhan, Sudarsan (2006), "Debate on Indian History: Revising Textbooks in California", Economic and Political Weekly, 41 (18): 1761–1763, JSTOR 4418171

Primary sources

- Edits and Corrections List (PDF), State Board of Education, California, 2006, archived (PDF) from the original on February 15, 2016
