= Pramod Kapoor =

Indian writer and publisher (born 1953)

- Born: 1953 (age 72–73); Kolkata, West Bengal, India
- Education: Banaras Hindu University
- Occupations: Publisher, author
- Known for: Founder of Roli Books
- Notable work: Gandhi: An Illustrated Biography; 1946 Royal Indian Navy Mutiny; Last War of Independence

Pramod Kapoor (born 1953) is an Indian writer and publisher, who in 1978 founded Roli Books, a publishing company that prints books pertaining to Indian heritage. In 2016, for his contributions to publishing, he was awarded the Chevalier de la Légion d'Honneur.

The first book he authored, Gandhi: An Illustrated Biography, was published in 2016. It led him to write 1946 Royal Indian Navy Mutiny; Last War of Independence, released in 2022. Previously he had produced illustrated versions of Khushwant Singh's Train to Pakistan and Manohar Malgonkar's The Men Who Killed Gandhi. He compiled the photographs of photojournalist Margaret Bourke-White in one of her biographies, picked several previously unpublished images from Britain to be included in New Delhi: The Making of a Capital (2009), and photo-edited the 'past' section of Calcutta Then – Kolkata Now (2019).

== Early life and education ==
Pramod Kapoor was born in 1953 in Jorasanko, Kolkata district of India, into a family associated with the distribution of paper in Uttar Pradesh. He was inspired at the age of ten when in 1963, he saw a portrait of Allen Lane, the founder of Penguin Books. He studied at the Banaras Hindu University. During his college years he worked for his brother, who owned a printing press.

== Career ==
After working in Delhi with Macmillan Publishers for two and half years, he founded Roli Books in 1978, initially to publish illustrated books, the first being one on Rajasthan. The business is family run; Kapoor works alongside his wife Kiran, son Kapil and daughter Priya. In 2014, he acquired India Ink imprint for fiction. Other imprints include Lustre Press for illustrated books, and the Lotus Collection for biographies, non-illustrated non-fiction books.

== Awards ==
In 2016, for his contributions to publishing and to promoting India's heritage, he was awarded the Chevalier de la Légion d'Honneur, presented by François Richier.

== Selected works ==
=== Illustrated books ===
Kapoor edited Khushwant Singh's Train to Pakistan (1956), published in 2006, with over 60 photographs by American photojournalist Margaret Bourke-White. Two years later he republished Manohar Malgonkar's The Men Who Killed Gandhi (1978), with photographs. He picked several previously unpublished images and newspaper cuttings from Britain to be included in New Delhi: The Making of a Capital (2009), and showed the wide coverage given in England on the extent of the project on building New Delhi. In Witness to Life and Freedom: Margaret Bourke-White in India and Pakistan (2013), he compiled the photographs by Bourke-White. He was photo editor of the 'past' section of Calcutta Then – Kolkata Now (2019). It contains essays by Sunanda K. Datta-Ray for 'then' and Indrajit Hazra for 'now', and images include those of polo matches, pukka sahibs, and the diminishing Anglo-Indian, Chinese, Jewish and Armenian communities. The book was described in the Hindustan Times as "an elegant Tête-bêche book".

=== Gandhi: An Illustrated Biography (2016) ===
Gandhi: An Illustrated Biography (2016) was the first book he authored. In it, Gandhi's biography is told in pictures, including photographs of Gandhi with members of the Greyville Cricket Club in Durban, a painting of Gandhi having surgery under a hurricane lamp in Poona, an artist's impression of the Great Trial of 1922, and a portrait of Gandhi having tea with King George V and Queen Mary in Buckingham Palace. Others include Gandhi with Charlie Chaplin. Kapoor subsequently began to work on a book titled My Experiments with Gandhi.

=== 1946 Royal Indian Navy Mutiny; Last War of Independence ===
He reported in an interview for the Hindustan Times that while reading volumes 89 and 90 of The Complete Works of Mahatma Gandhi in his research for Gandhi's biography, he became interested in the Royal Indian Navy mutiny. It led him to look at historical records, newspaper reports, mutineer memoirs, and interviews with their descendants, to produce the book 1946 Royal Indian Navy Mutiny; Last War of Independence. It was reviewed by Vinay Lal who described the work as "a superb reminder" of an event near forgotten.
