= Roli Books =

Indian publishing house

- Founded: 1978; 47 years ago
- Founder: Pramod Kapoor
- Headquarters location: M-75, Greater Kailash 2 Market New Delhi India
- Distribution: India & worldwide
- Key people: Pramod Kapoor; Kapil Kapoor; Priya Kapoor
- Publication types: Books
- Official website: www.rolibooks.com

Roli Books is an Indian publishing house that produces and publishes books pertaining to Indian heritage. It was founded in 1978 by Pramod Kapoor and is jointly run by his family.

Its imprints include Lustre Press for illustrated books, India Ink for fiction, and the Lotus Collection for biographies, non-illustrated non-fiction books.

== Origin ==
Roli Books was founded in 1978 by Pramod Kapoor, initially with an illustrated book on Rajasthan, first printed in Singapore. The company developed relations with publishing houses in France following Kapoor trip to Paris in 1981, when he bought 3,000 copies of The Last Maharaja and sold the whole lot in India. Subsequently, they published books and sold them in France. By its 25th anniversary, it was also publishing fiction.

== Imprints ==
Imprints at Roli Books include Lustre Press for illustrated books, India Ink for fiction, and the Lotus Collection for biographies, non-illustrated non-fiction books.

== Products ==
The company publishes coffee table books and limited edition books. Its publications include Calcutta Then, Kolkata Now (2019), and The Emperor's Table: The Art of Mughal Cuisine.
