= Rudrangshu Mukherjee =

Indian historian

1st Vice Chancellor of Ashoka University
- In office 2014–2017
- Succeeded by: Prof. Pratap Bhanu Mehta

Chancellor of Ashoka University
- Incumbent
- Assumed office 2017

Personal details
- Education: Oxford University
- Occupation: Historian

Rudrangshu Mukherjee is a historian and author of several history books. He was formerly the Opinions Editor for The Telegraph newspaper, Kolkata and the Chancellor for Ashoka University, where he also serves as Professor of History. He was the founding Vice-Chancellor of Ashoka when the University began in 2014 and was succeeded in 2017 by Pratap Bhanu Mehta.

== Academics ==
He studied at Calcutta Boys' School, Presidency College, Kolkata, Jawaharlal Nehru University, New Delhi, and St Edmund Hall, Oxford.

His 1980 D.Phil thesis at the University of Oxford was titled "The rebellion in Awadh, 1857-1858: a study in popular resistance". He has revisited his view of the revolt from the native perspective in books including Awadh in Revolt 1857-58: A Study of Popular Resistance (Delhi, 1984, repr. 2002), Spectre of Violence: The 1857 Kanpur Massacres (Delhi, 1988), and Mangal Pandey: Brave Martyr or Accidental Hero? (Penguin India).

== Career ==
He has taught history at the University of Calcutta and held visiting appointments at Princeton University, the University of Manchester, the University of California, Santa Cruz and the Young India Fellowship, New Delhi. At the Centre for Studies in Social Sciences, Calcutta (CSSSC), which he had joined as a Junior Research Fellow in 1975, he was involved in issues concerning the ascendancy of the North in the production of knowledge. He has edited The Penguin Gandhi Reader (Delhi, 1993) and is the author of the Art of Bengal: A Vision Defined, 1955-75 (Kolkata, 2003), and co-edited Trade and Politics and the Indian Ocean World: Essays in Honour of Ashin Das Gupta (Delhi, 1998).

He has authored and edited several books on other themes, including The Penguin Gandhi Reader, Trade and Politics and the Indian Ocean World: Essays in Honour of Ashin Das Gupta, Remembered Childhood: Essays in Honour of Andre Beteille, New Delhi: The Making of a Capital and Great Speeches of Modern India. His latest book is Nehru and Bose.

He has also worked on the history of the leftist movement in India. After the 2007 Nandigram episode, he was among those leftist intellectuals in Kolkata who protested the violent policies of the left.

Academic offices
Preceded by New title	Vice-Chancellor of Ashoka University; 2014-2017	Succeeded by Pratap Bhanu Mehta
Preceded by New title	Chancellor of Ashoka University since 2017	Succeeded by incumbent
