= T-24 (tiger) =

Tiger from India

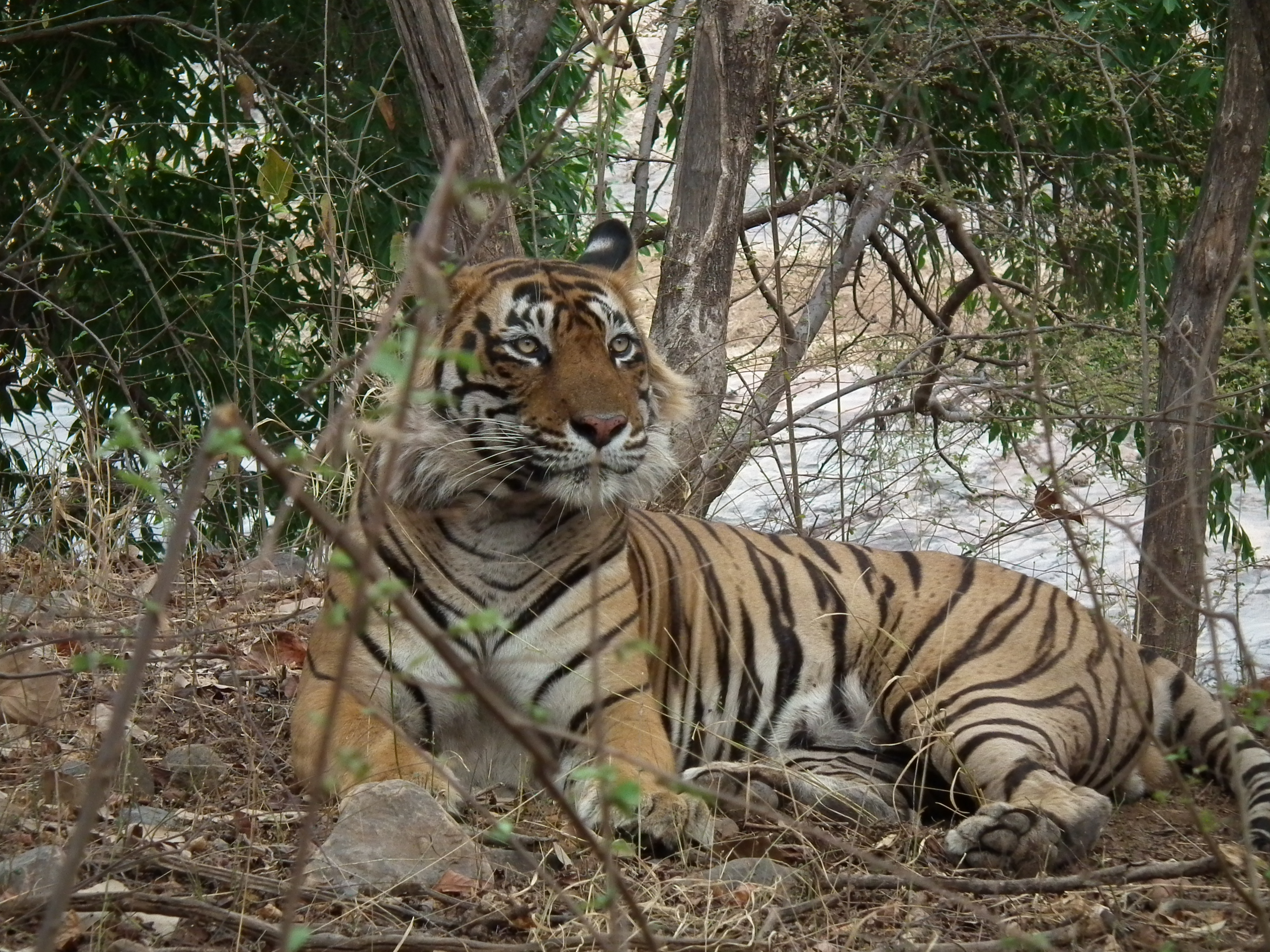
- Tiger T-24, aka Ustad, in Ranthambore National Park in 2012
- Species: Bengal tiger (Panthera tigris tigris)
- Sex: Male
- Owner: Ranthambore National Park
- Offspring: 4

T-24 (2006-December 28, 2022), also called Ustad, was a tiger who lived in Ranthambore National Park, India, that killed four humans. T-24 sired four tigers.

== History ==
T-24, popularly called Ustad, was a dominant male tiger occupying Zones 1, 2, and 6 of Ranthambhore National Park. He was born in the Lahpur area in 2006 to the tiger named T20 (Jhumroo), and tigress T22 (Gayatri), His brothers were T-23 and T-25. His grandmother was Machali T-16, a celebrated tigress.

T-24 rose to dominance in 2010 and took over Zones 1,2 and 6. He patrolled his growing 40 km^{2} territory at night and was known to instill fear in poachers and forest guards, because of his fearless nature. He was popularly called Ustad which means "the Master". Officially weighing 258 kg (570 lbs) on forest department paperwork as of May 16, 2015 on an empty stomach, and estimated to be up to 270 kg (596 lbs) by a local biologist, he was one of the largest tigers Ranthambhore has seen.

T-24's mating partner was T-39, popularly called Noor, and together they had three male cubs from two separate litters. Those cubs are no longer seen in Ranthambhore National Park, but have moved north to Keladevi Sanctuary according to the Field Director Y.K. Sahu. Later, it was confirmed by a local NGO that the cubs had been poached.

On May 8, 2015, T-24 was controversially identified as the tiger that killed forest guard Rampal Saini. The forest department stated that this was T-24's fourth human kill, and they moved him out of the wild to a zoo in Udaipur in the larger interest of tiger conservation in Ranthambhore. This move caused massive social uproar. Activists argued that all four killings occurred in the core area which is supposed to be inviolate space for tigers, and that there was no definitive proof that T-24 was the killer tiger. They took their cause to the streets, online, and to the courts.

On May 28, 2015, the Jaipur High Court concluded that the removal of T-24 was legal, and pointed out that the Ranthambhore Tiger Reserve officials are the appropriate authority to make Ranthambhore wild tiger translocation decisions. Activists continue to pursue the case legally and otherwise with no success.

In the zoo, T-24 suffered various health issues including megacolon and was placed on a special diet and medication. In June 2022, T-24 was diagnosed with a bone tumor after being seen limping around the enclosure. In spite of best efforts by the government, he died of the cancer on December 28, 2022.

The documentary Tiger 24 about T-24 was released in 2022.

He remains the only tiger to have graced the cover of India Today magazine and the only tiger to have commanded the attention of the Delhi High Court, Jaipur High Court, and Supreme Court of India.
