= Nicobar Islands rain forests =

Terrestrial ecoregion in the Nicobar Islands

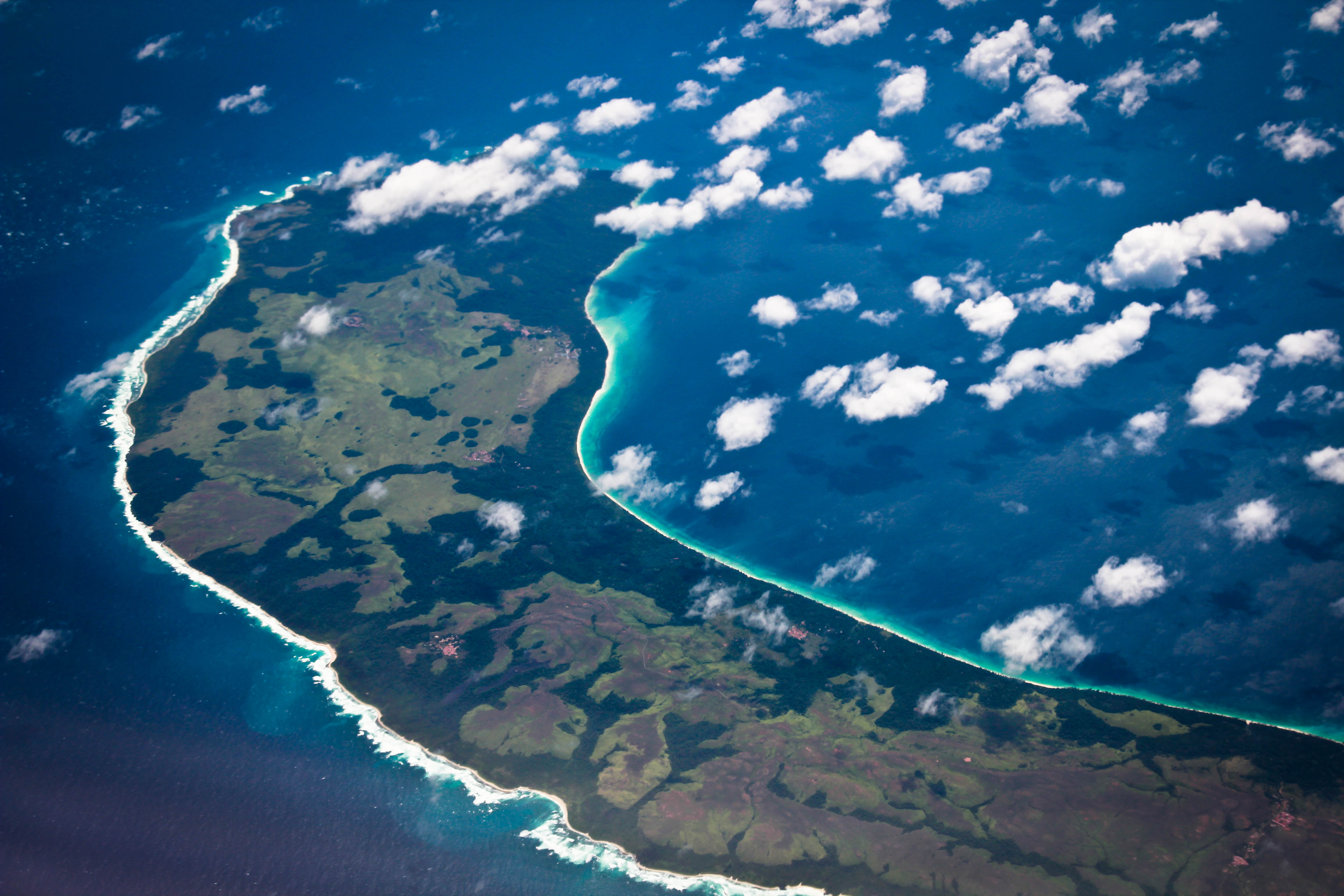
- Teressa Island

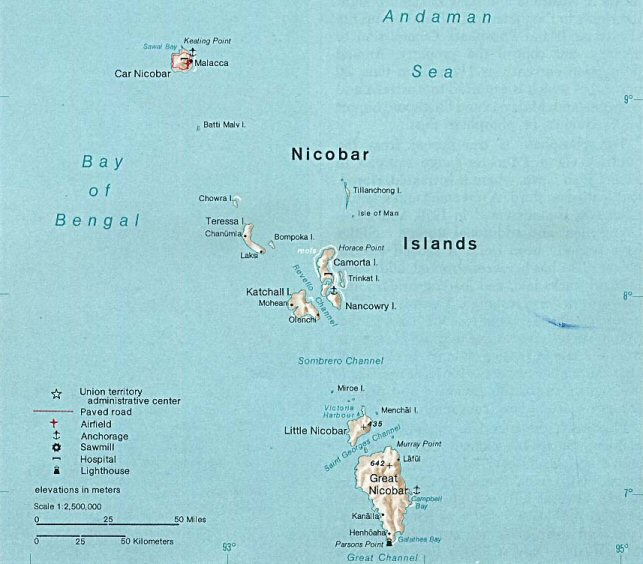
- Map of the Nicobar Islands

Ecology
- Realm: Indomalayan realm
- Biome: tropical and subtropical moist broadleaf forests

Geography
- Area: 1,699 km^{2} (656 mi^{2})
- Countries: India
- Union territory: Andaman and Nicobar Islands

Conservation
- Conservation status: Critical/endangered
- Protected: 57%

The Nicobar Islands rain forests are a tropical moist broadleaf forest ecoregion in the Nicobar Islands, which is part of the Andaman and Nicobar Islands union territory of India. The Nicobar Islands are in the Indian Ocean, lying north of Sumatra and south of the Andaman Islands. The islands are politically part of India, although physically closer to Southeast Asia. Millions of years of isolation from the mainland has given rise to a distinct flora and fauna, including many endemic species.

== Geography ==
The Nicobar Islands consist of 22 islands, of which 13 are inhabited. The islands extend about 260 km from north and south, and form three groups. The northern group is composed of Car Nicobar, the northernmost island, and Batti Malv. The central group includes Nancowry, Katchal, Kamorta, Teressa, Chowra, Tillangchong, and several smaller islets. The southern group includes Great Nicobar, Little Nicobar and several smaller islets. Great Nicobar is the largest (921 km^{2} (356 sq mi)), highest (Mount Thullier, 670 m), and southernmost island.

The Andaman Sea lies east of the islands, and the Bay of Bengal to the west. The Ten Degree Channel separates the Car Nicobar from the southernmost of the Andaman Islands 150 km north. Sumatra lies 189 miles south of Great Nicobar.

The Andaman and Nicobar Islands form an island arc over 600 km in length, created by the subduction of the Indian Plate under the Burma Plate, of which the Nicobar and Andaman islands are part. The subduction zone creates periodic large earthquakes, including the 1881 Nicobar Islands earthquake and the 2004 Indian Ocean earthquake.

The surface geology of the islands consists of Eocene sedimentary rocks (sandstone, shale, and siltstone) at lower elevations, with intrusions of ultrabasic igneous rock. Serpentinite and gabbro are found at higher elevations.

Only Great Nicobar has perennial streams. The island has five perennial rivers – the Galathea, Jubilee, Amrit Kaur, Dak Aniang, and Dak Tayal – which all originate from Mount Thullier. The Galathea River is the longest, flowing southwards for about 30 km to empty into the sea at Galathea Bay near the southern tip of the island.

== Climate ==
The Nicobar Islands have a tropical rain forest climate. Average temperatures range from 22 to 30 °C. Average annual rainfall ranges from 3,000 to 3,800 mm. Heavier rainfall coincides ith the monsoon winds, which come from the southwest from May to September, and from the northeast between October and December.

== Flora ==
Plant communities on the islands include mangroves and coastal forests near the shore, and evergreen and deciduous forests in the interiors of the islands.

Coastal forests feature widespread Indo-Pacific seashore plants, including the trees Barringtonia sp., Pandanus sp., and Casuarina equisetifolia, with the shrubs Scaevola frutescens, Hibiscus tiliaceus, and Clerodendrum inerme. There are extensive areas of coconut palm (Cocos nucifera) along the coast, both cultivated and wild.

The evergreen forests on Great Nicobar, Kamorta, and Katchal are dominated by the trees Calophyllum soulattri, Sideroxylon longipetiolatum, Garcinia xanthochymus, Pisonia excelsa, and Mangifera sylvatica, with Artocarpus peduncularis, Radermachera lobbi, Symplocos leiostachya, and Bentinckia nicobarica also present on Kamorta and Katchal. Species of Macaranga, Ficus, and Terminalia are common along the riverbanks of Great Nicobar. The tree canopy averages 30 to 50 metres in height. The climbing bamboo Dinochloa andamanica climbs the tall trees.

Deciduous forests are found at lower elevations on Great Nicobar, and typical trees include Terminalia procera and Terminalia bialata.

Some of the northern and central islands, including Car Nicobar, Kamorta, Katchall, and Nancowry, have extensive areas of grassland in the interior. The grasslands may be anthropogenic in origin. Typical species include the grasses Imperata cylindrica, Saccharum spontaneum, Heteropogon contortus, Chloris barbata, Chrysopogon aciculatus, and Scleria cochinchinensis, together with herbs and shrubs.

There are 580 species of flowering plants on the islands. Approximately 14% are endemic to the islands. The flora of the islands shares more affinities with Sumatra and the Malay Peninsula than with the Andamans or Myanmar; only 28% of flowering plant species are shared with the Andamans.

The palms Bentinckia nicobarica, Rhopaloblaste augusta, Calamus dilaceratus, and Calamus nicobaricus are endemic to the Nicobar Islands. Areca triandra, Calamus andamanicus, Caryota mitis, Korthalsia laciniosa, Licuala peltata, and Pinanga manii are more widespread species native to the islands.

== Fauna ==
There are 25 native mammal species on the islands, principally bats and rats. Large mammals include the wild boar (Sus scrofa) and Nicobar macaque (Macaca fascicularis umbrosa). Four species are endemic to the islands – the Nicobar shrew (Crocidura nicobarica) on Great Nicobar, the Nicobar treeshrew (Tupaia nicobarica) on Great Nicobar and Little Nicobar, the Palm rat (Rattus palmarum) on Car Nicobar and Great Nicobar, and the Nicobar flying fox (Pteropus faunulus) throughout the islands.

82 species of birds are native to the islands. These include eight species of heron, seven hawk species, six kingfisher species, and six species of pigeon. Five species are endemic, including the Nicobar serpent-eagle (Spilornis minimus), Nicobar sparrowhawk (Accipiter butleri), Nicobar parakeet (Psittacula caniceps), and Nicobar bulbul (Hypsipetes nicobariensis). The Nicobar scrubfowl (Megapodius nicobariensis) once inhabited the Andaman islands as well, but is now extinct there and found only on the Nicobar Islands. Four species, the Andaman wood-pigeon (Columba palumboides), Andaman cuckoo-dove (Macropygia rufipennis), Andaman boobook (Ninox affinis), and white-headed starling (Sturnus erythropygius), are limited to the Andaman and Nicobar Islands. The ecoregion constitutes the Nicobar Islands endemic bird area.

There are 43 reptile species on the islands, of which eleven are endemic. There are eleven species of amphibians, all frogs and toads, including two endemic species, the Nicobar tree frog (Polypedates insularis) and Nicobar cricket-frog (Minervarya nicobariensis).

== People ==
The islands have been inhabited for centuries. The Nicobarese people live on twelve of the islands. Most Nicobarese live in villages, and grow a variety of tree, root, and vegetable crops for food, fiber, and building materials, including coconut, areca palm, papaya, banana, breadfruit, jackfruit, and yams. Pigs and chickens are kept for food, and wild fruits, roots, tubers, and fibers are gathered from the forests.

Larger plantations of coconut have been established near the coast, and tapioca, sweet potato, sugarcane, and cashew are grown in the interior of the more populated islands.

The 2011 census recorded 36,842 people on the islands. Starting in the late 1960s the Indian government encouraged people from mainland India to settle on the islands, and by the late 1990s mainlanders constituted over a third of the population. The islands, together with the Andaman Islands, constitute the Andaman and Nicobar Islands union territory of India. The Nicobar Islands are administered as a separate district. Malacca on Car Nicobar is the district's administrative headquarters.

== Conservation and threats ==
57% of the islands' land area is in protected areas. A 1997 assessment found that only 14% of the islands' forests had been removed. A 2017 assessment found that 18% of the islands' unprotected area is still covered in primary forest.

== Protected areas ==
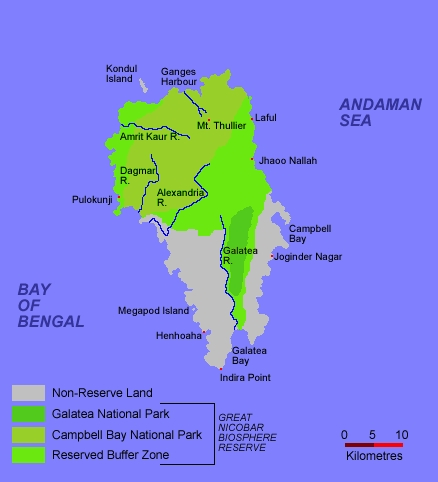
Map of the Great Nicobar Biosphere Reserve

17% of the ecoregion is in protected areas. Protected areas include Campbell Bay National Park and Galathea National Park on Great Nicobar.

The Great Nicobar Biosphere Reserve was designated on Great Nicobar by UNESCO in 2013. The reserve has a total area of 103,870 ha. The core area of 53,623 ha comprises Cambell Bay and Galathea National parks. A buffer area of 34,877 includes lands adjacent to and between the two parks. There is also a transitional area of 10,070 ha, including 5,300 marine hectares.
