= List of airports in Andaman and Nicobar Islands =

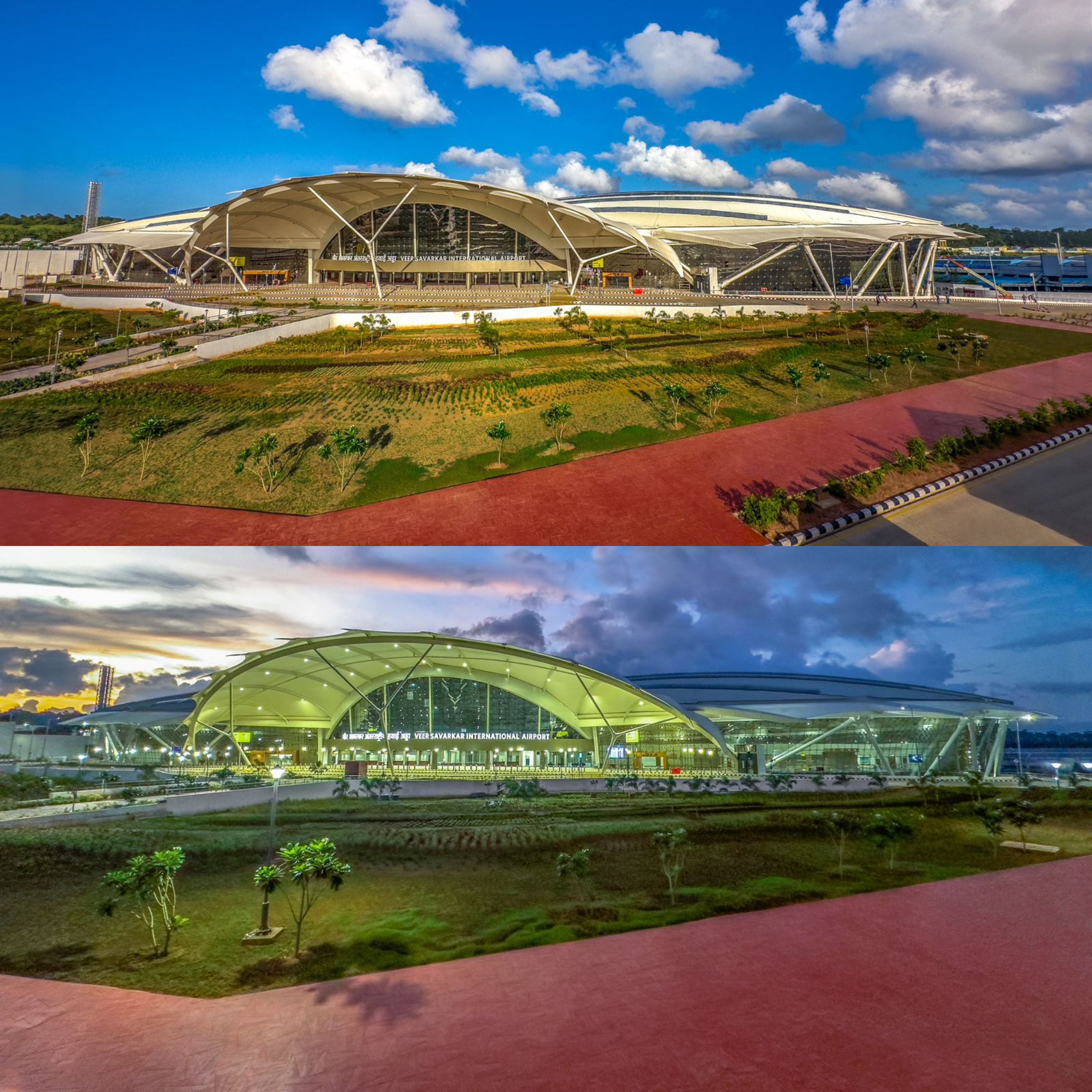
Veer Savarkar International Airport, Port Blair

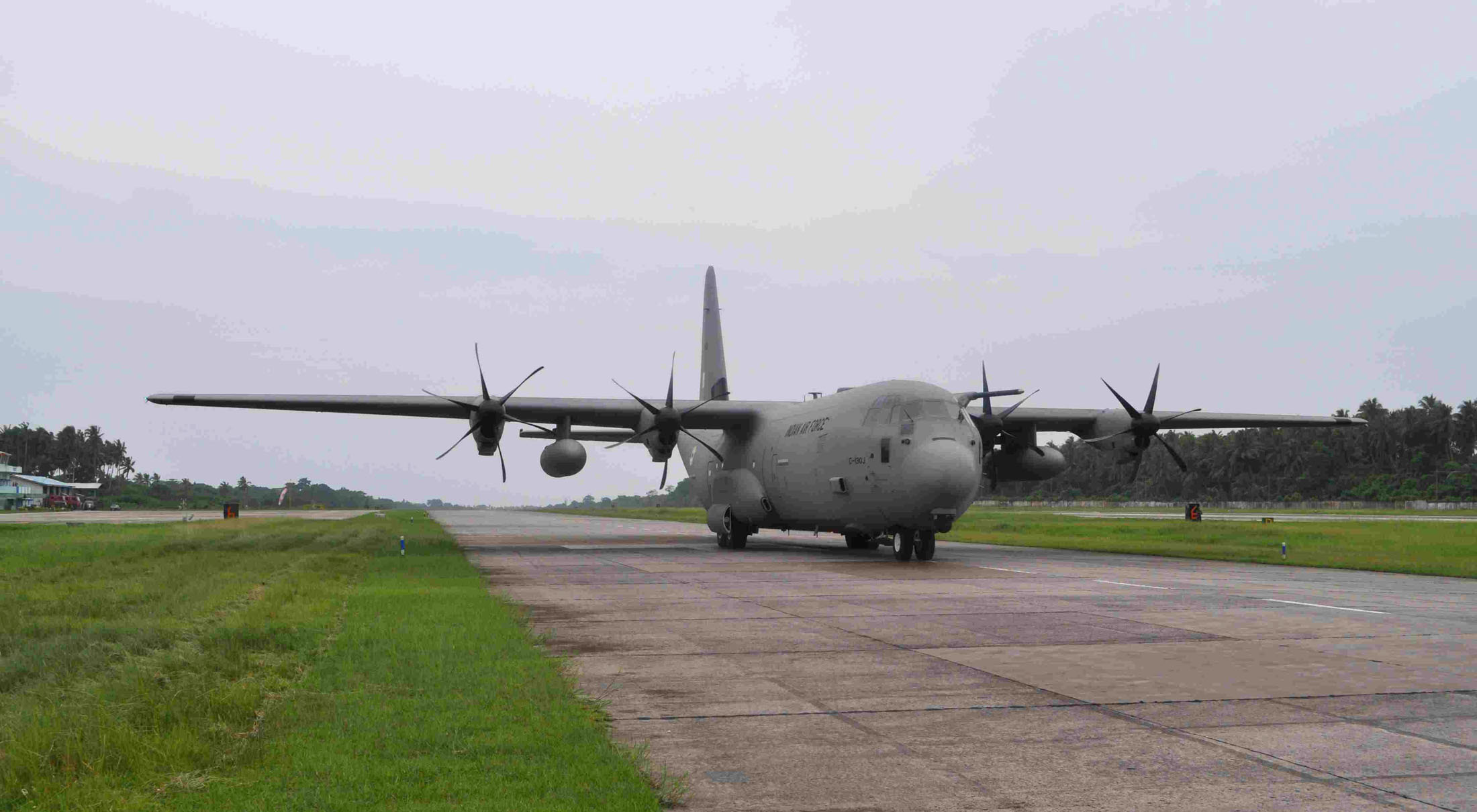
An IAF C-130J aircraft at Car Nicobar AFS

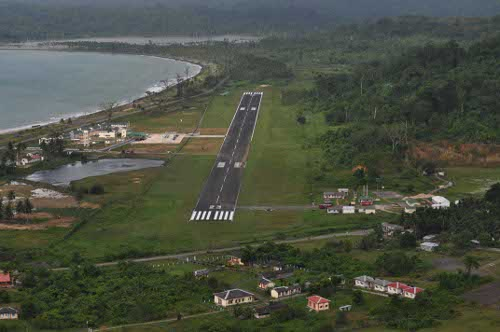
INS Baaz airstrip

Andaman and Nicobar Islands, a union territory of India, has an international-designated airport and a few airstrips for military and emergency purposes. The Veer Savarkar International Airport in Port Blair is jointly operated by the Airports Authority of India and Indian Navy while the aerodromes at Car Nicobar by Indian Air Force, Campbell Bay and Diglipur are operated by the Indian Navy only.

The new terminal at Veer Savarkar International Airport in Port Blair was inaugurated on 18 July 2023 to enhance the capacity of the airport amid increased tourism. Under the Government of India's UDAN scheme, 3 airstrips and 4 water aerodromes are proposed to be developed to improve inter-connectivity among the islands and increase tourism.

== List ==
The list includes the airports in Andaman and Nicobar Islands with their respective ICAO and IATA codes.

=== Land airports ===
List of airports in Andaman and Nicobar Islands
Sl. no.	Location/City in Andaman and Nicobar Islands	Airport name	ICAO	IATA	Operator	Category	Role
International airports
1	Port Blair	Veer Savarkar International Airport	VOPB	IXZ	AAI and Indian Navy	International	Commercial
Domestic/regional/military airports
2	Campbell Bay	INS Baaz	VOBX	—	Indian Navy	Defence	Military
3	Car Nicobar	Car Nicobar Air Force Base	VOCX	CBD	Indian Air Force	Defence	Military
4	Diglipur	INS Kohassa	VODX	—	Indian Navy	Defence	Military

=== Water aerodrome ===
There are 4 water aerodromes in Andaman and Nicobar Islands (listed north to south) for the civilian seaplane services under the government’s regional connectivity scheme (UDAN):

- Long Island
- Swaraj Dweep (formerly Havelock Island)
- Shaheed Dweep (formerly Neil Island)
- Hutbay at Little Andaman Island

== Future ==
A new airfield has been proposed to be constructed at Chingen, located on the southern part of the island. The project, worth ₹8,573 crore (US$890 million), has been undertaken by the Airports Authority of India as a civil-military dual-purpose greenfield airport. The DPR has been approved and commercial bidding is to follow by late 2025. It will be the second airport in the Great Nicobar Islands following INS Baaz. The project is part of the larger International Container Transshipment Port programme.
