= Great Nicobar Island Development Project =

Planned project in India

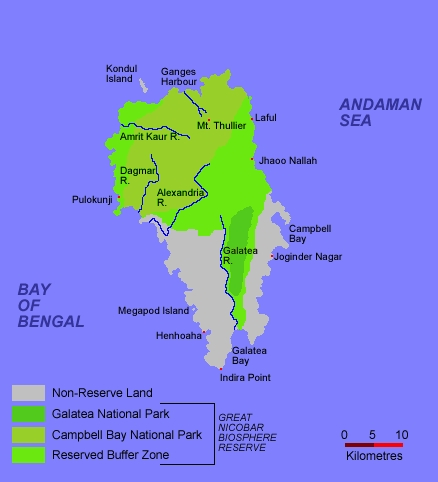
Great Nicobar Biosphere map, Great Nicobar Island Development Project will be in the southeast and southwest.

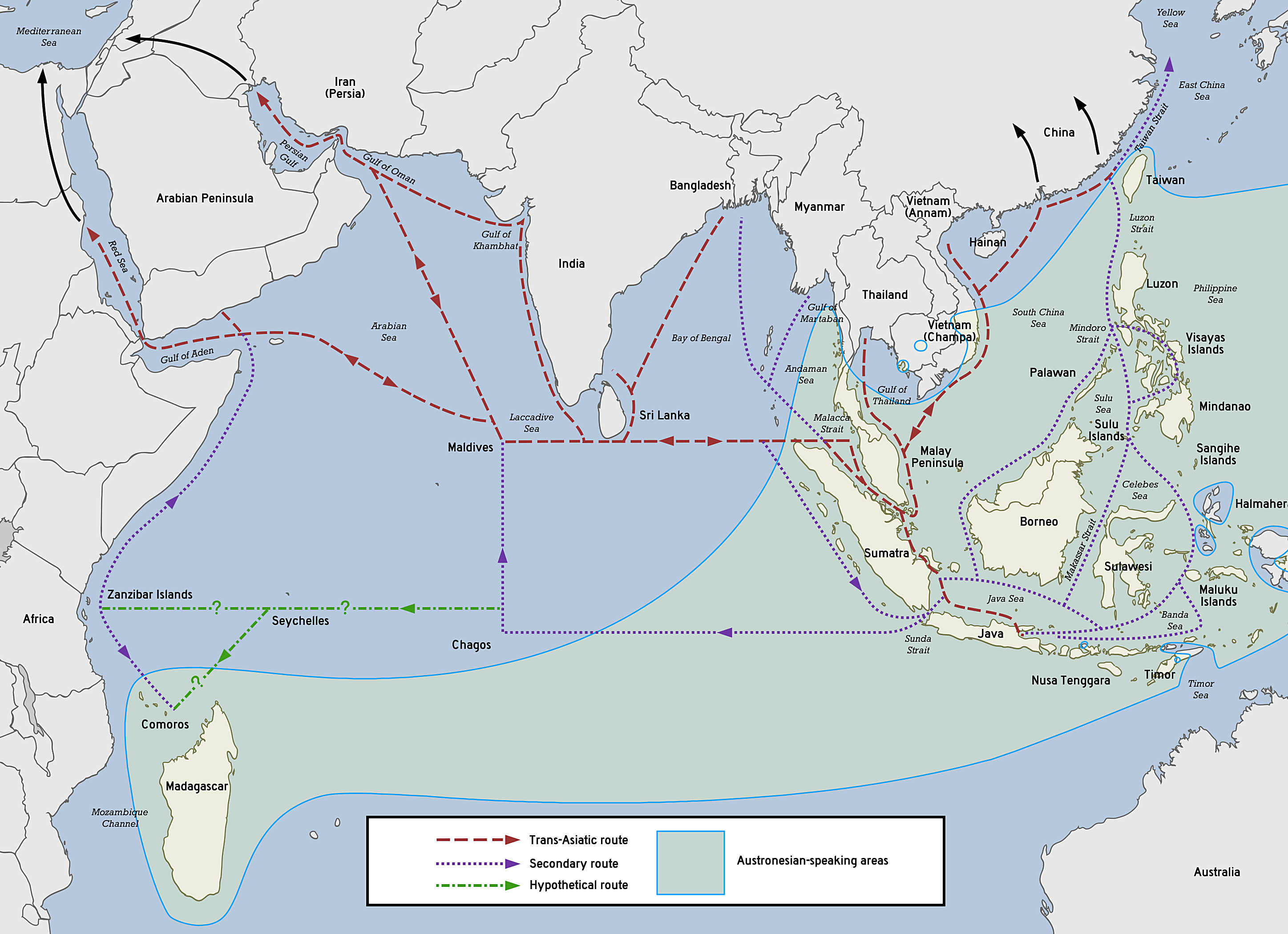
The Austronesian maritime trade network was the first trade routes in the Indian Ocean.

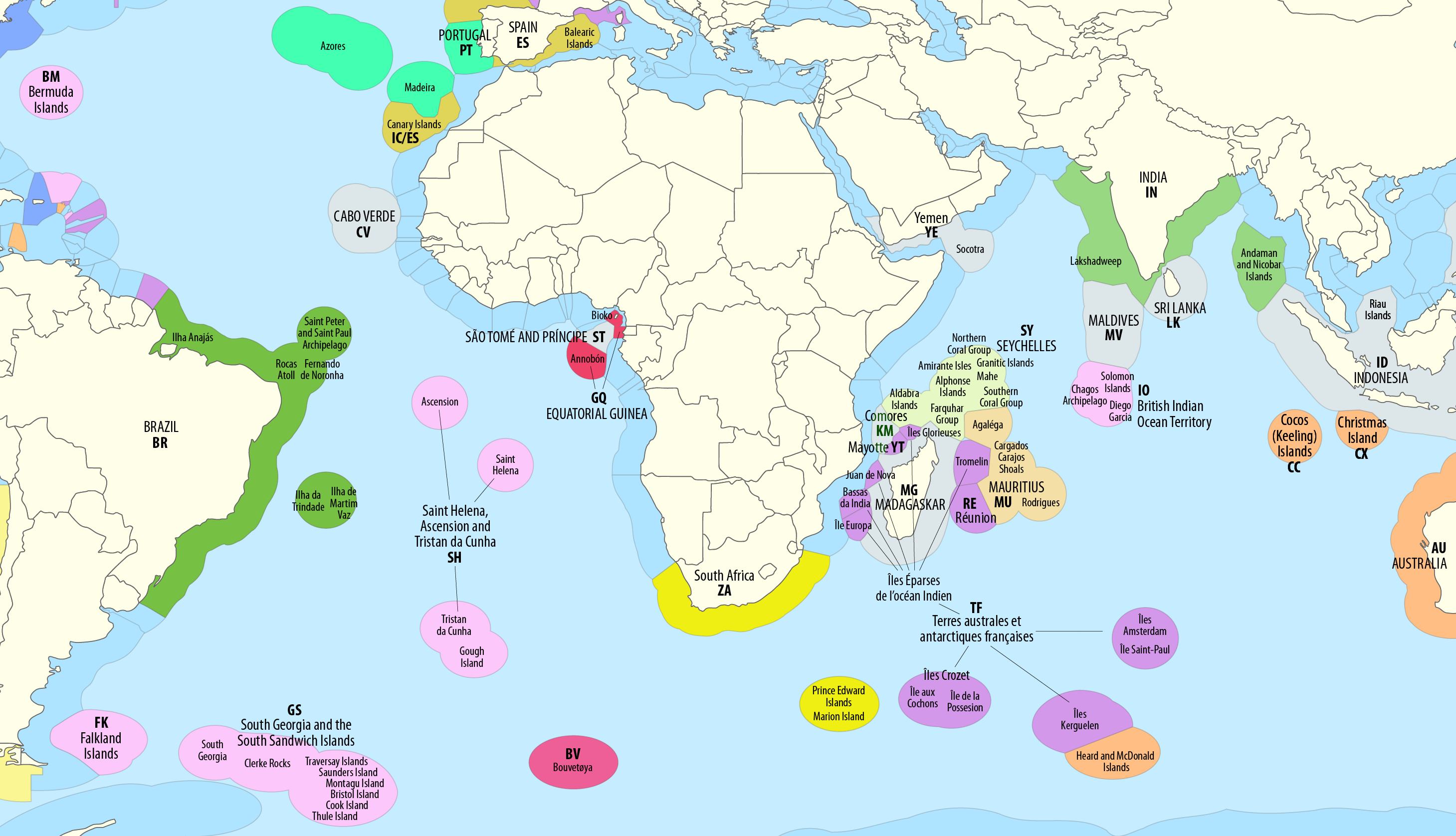
EEZs in the Atlantic and Indian Oceans.

The Great Nicobar Island Development Project (GNIDP) is a large infrastructure initiative proposed by the Government of India for Great Nicobar Island in the Andaman and Nicobar Islands, aimed at building an international container transshipment terminal, a dual‑use civil and military airport, a power plant and a township. The project is intended to strengthen India's strategic presence in the Indian Ocean region and reduce reliance on foreign transshipment hubs by leveraging the island’s proximity to major shipping routes such as the Strait of Malacca.

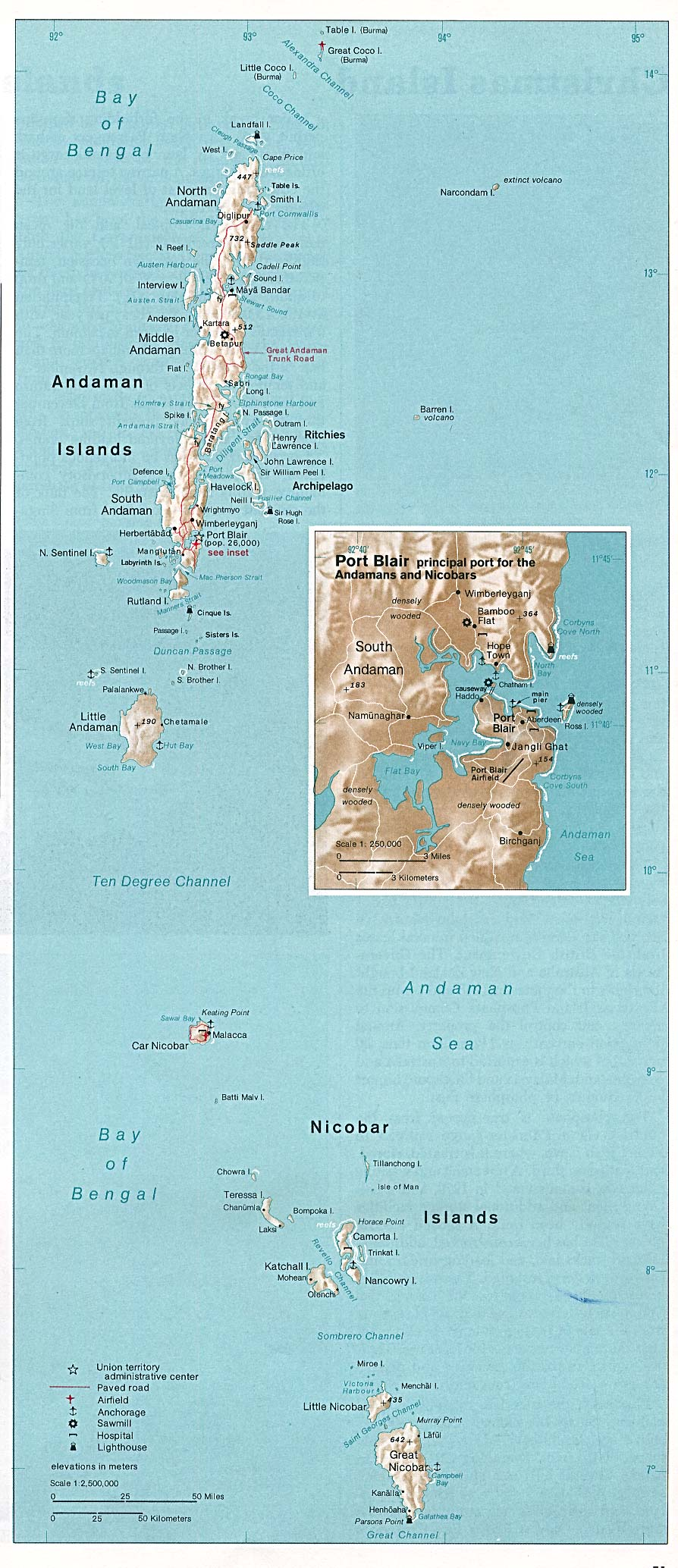
Andaman and Nicobar Islands map with Great Nicobar Islands at the bottom.

The proposal has attracted scrutiny from environmental groups, researchers and opposition politicians over concerns about its ecological impacts, including forest diversion, effects on coastal and marine ecosystems, and potential impacts on indigenous communities such as the Shompen and Nicobarese peoples.

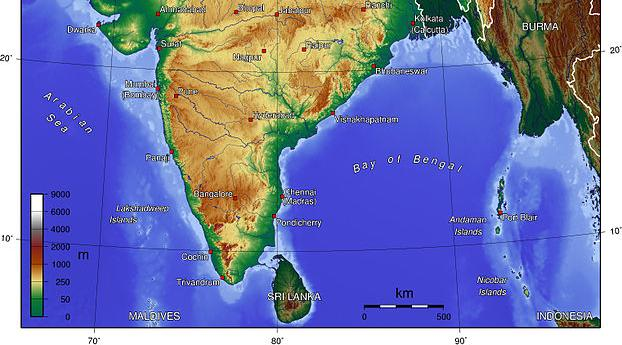
Map of Coastal India with major landmarks with Great Nicobar Islands in the bottom right.

== History ==
A feasibility report, commissioned by NITI Aayog, was prepared by AECOM India. On 25 May 2021, terms of reference of project was granted after meeting held by Expert Appraisal Committee.

== Geography ==
Excluding the area from Campbell Bay on eastern side of the island to the Galathea Bay in the south and the whole southern tip, the rest of Great Nicobar Island is part of Galathea National Park and the larger Campbell Bay National Park. Galathea River, flowing north to south, meets the Indian Ocean at Galathea Bay. Indira Point adjacent to the Galathea Bay, India's southernmost point, is 145 km or 80 nautical miles north of Indonesia's northernmost island, Rondo Island in Sabang district of Aceh province of Sumatra, near to which is Indonesia's deep sea port, Sabang (612 km or 330 nautical miles south of Indira Point), jointly upgraded by India and Indonesia in 2019 under the strategic military and economic collaboration to protect the channel between Great Nicobar Island and Rondo Island.

Great Nicobar sits atop a major seismic fault line: an earthquake with its epicenter around 80 miles from Great Nicobar contributed to the tsunami in 2004, which killed 230,000 people and displaced millions in Indonesia, India, and Sri Lanka. The day the tsunami struck, Great Nicobar’s southern tip sank by around 15 feet, slipping into the ocean. Most settlements on its coast were washed away. The seismic faultline continues to be active. In July 2025, a geologist warned that an ongoing cluster of smaller earthquakes near the Nicobar Islands could signal a volcanic eruption in the Andaman Sea. This raises fears of another tsunami.

Holistic Master Plan for this project, outside the Galathea National Park, covers an area of 166.10 sq km covering seven revenue villages, which fall under the jurisdiction of three Gram Panchayats.

== Project ==
=== Components ===
The total project cost is ₹75,000 crore (US$9.4 billion in 2022) and corrected to ₹81,000 crore (US$8.5 billion) in 2025, was conceived by NITI Aayog and is being developed by Andaman and Nicobar Islands Integrated Development Corporation (ANIIDC). offering geostrategic importance for defence, logistics, commerce and industries, eco-tourism, coastal tourism, and Coastal Regulation Zone. The project, to be completed in phases over 30 years, includes:

- Multi-model transport hub:
  - Galathea Bay International Container Transhipment Terminal (Galathea Bay ICTT) on eastern side of Galathea Bay with total 16 million TEU (twenty-foot equivalent units of cargo) capacity, with phase-I capacity of 4 million TEUs.
  - Cruise Ship Terminal has natural water depth of over 20 metres, and is located 40 nautical miles from the East-West international shipping route giving it an advantage to attract both gateway and transhipment cargo, reduce India’s dependence on foreign ports like Colombo (Sri Lanka), Jurong Port (Singapore), and Klang (Malaysia).
  - Great Nicobar International Airport (GNIA), a greenfield airport at Chingen, on the immediate northeast side of Galathea Bay, with peak hour capacity of 4,000 passengers. The new airport is expected to handle at least 1 million passengers when it opens and grow to approximately 10 million passengers per year thereafter. Since the island is close to international tourist destinations like Phuket Island (Thailand), Penang (Malaysia) and Langkawi Island (Malaysia), it will become tourism and transit hub. The civil-military airport project worth ₹13,000 crore (US$1.3 billion) was cleared in June 2026. The airport will be built within five years and will remain under naval operational control while regularly serving civil aviation needs.
  - Coastal Expressway 4-lane wide: A brand-new, 22-kilometre-long, 4-lane expressway is being constructed to connect the Galathea Bay Port directly to the new Greenfield International Airport and the commercial township further north. To prevent fragmenting the rainforest and disrupting wildlife migration, extensive segments of this expressway are built as elevated corridors on concrete stilts. This allows animals, including the island's unique crab populations and macaques, to pass safely underneath the highway.
  - Mass Transit Rail linking Port-to-Airport : To facilitate rapid supply movement, the master plan includes a dedicated automated rail transit corridor running parallel to the expressway. This rail line is designed primarily for high-speed container and air-cargo transfers. If an ultra-valuable or time-sensitive shipment arrives via an ocean liner at Galathea Bay, it can be offloaded onto the rail link, shuttled to the international airport within minutes, and flown out immediately on a long-haul cargo jet. The entire rail network is planned as a fully electrified, zero-emission line powered by the island's upcoming gas-solar hybrid power grids.
- Utilities:
  - Great Nicobar Gas and Solar Power Plant (Great Nicobar GSPP) on immediate northwest side of and Galathea Bay with 450 MVA capacity, spread over 16,610 hectares. An uninterrupted energy supply is a key component in increasing the GDP of the island. Installation of a 450 MVA gas and solar-based power plant alongside a 5 MW solar project paired with a battery energy storage system (BESS).
  - Desalination plant: Because constructing heavy land-based water infrastructure takes years, the immediate Phase 1 port layout relies on Sea Water Reverse Osmosis (SWRO) desalination plants. These automated modular units filter seawater to provide instant fresh water for port operations, cooling systems, and ship provisioning.
  - Galathea River Dam: To sustain the upcoming mega-township and smart city, the irrigation and public health departments have proposed a freshwater reservoir dam along the upper stretches of the Galathea River. This dam faces severe environmental pushback. The Galathea River is a critical habitat for the endangered Nicobar Megapode (a unique mound-building bird) and giant saltwater crocodiles. Environmental clearance laws require strict buffer zones, meaning the dam's design is limited to low-impact, run-of-the-river check systems rather than massive concrete valley floodwalls.
- Two new greenfield coastal cities spanning 16,610 hectares (166.1 sqkm), one on the southeast side of the Great Nicobar Island between Campbell Bay and Galathea Bay and another on southwest side of the Great Nicobar Island to the west of Galathea Bay. It will provide urban residential, commercial and institutional infrastructure for personnel, service providers and associated economic activities.
  - Industrial Hub.
  - Luxury Tourism Resorts Hub.

=== Phases ===
The Great Nicobar Project covering a total area of 166.10 sq km, including 35.35 sqkm revenue land and 130.75 sqkm forest land, will be developed in 3 phases:

- 2025–2035 Phase I, 72.12 sqkm for basic infrastructure: including phase-I of Galathea Bay International Container Transshipment Port (ICTP), dual-use military and civilian Campbell Bay International Airport with 3 km runway, modular desalination plant, installation of a 450 MVA gas and solar-based power plant, 22 km expressway, township development with basic trunk infrastructure and early coastal across Campbell Bay, Gandhi Nagar, and Govind Nagar to accommodate the incoming industrial workforce.
- 2036–2041 Phase II, 45.27 sqkm with commercialization, tourism, and urban expansion: Including port expansion, tourism & wellness hubs with AYUSH, Cruise Ship Terminal, township expansion, river dam, metro train.
- 2042–2047 Phase III, 48.71 sqkm global financial and tourism smart city hub: with Singapore-Dubai-style port-linked international finance hub, smart city with entertainment & smart precincts with high-density commercial infrastructure, digital business parks, and designated entertainment/gaming precincts.

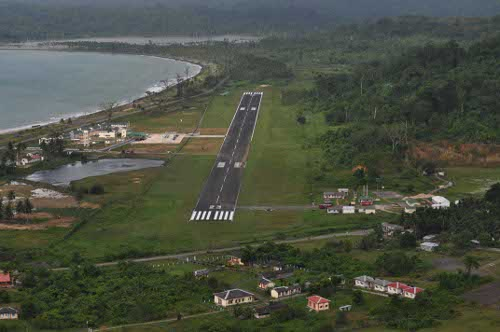
INS Baaz bird's eye view.

=== Existing infrastructure ===
INS Baaz naval base with existing airstrip at Campbell Bay, under the Andaman and Nicobar Command, connects island with Car Nicobar and Port Blair Air bases.

== Impact ==
=== Strategic significance ===
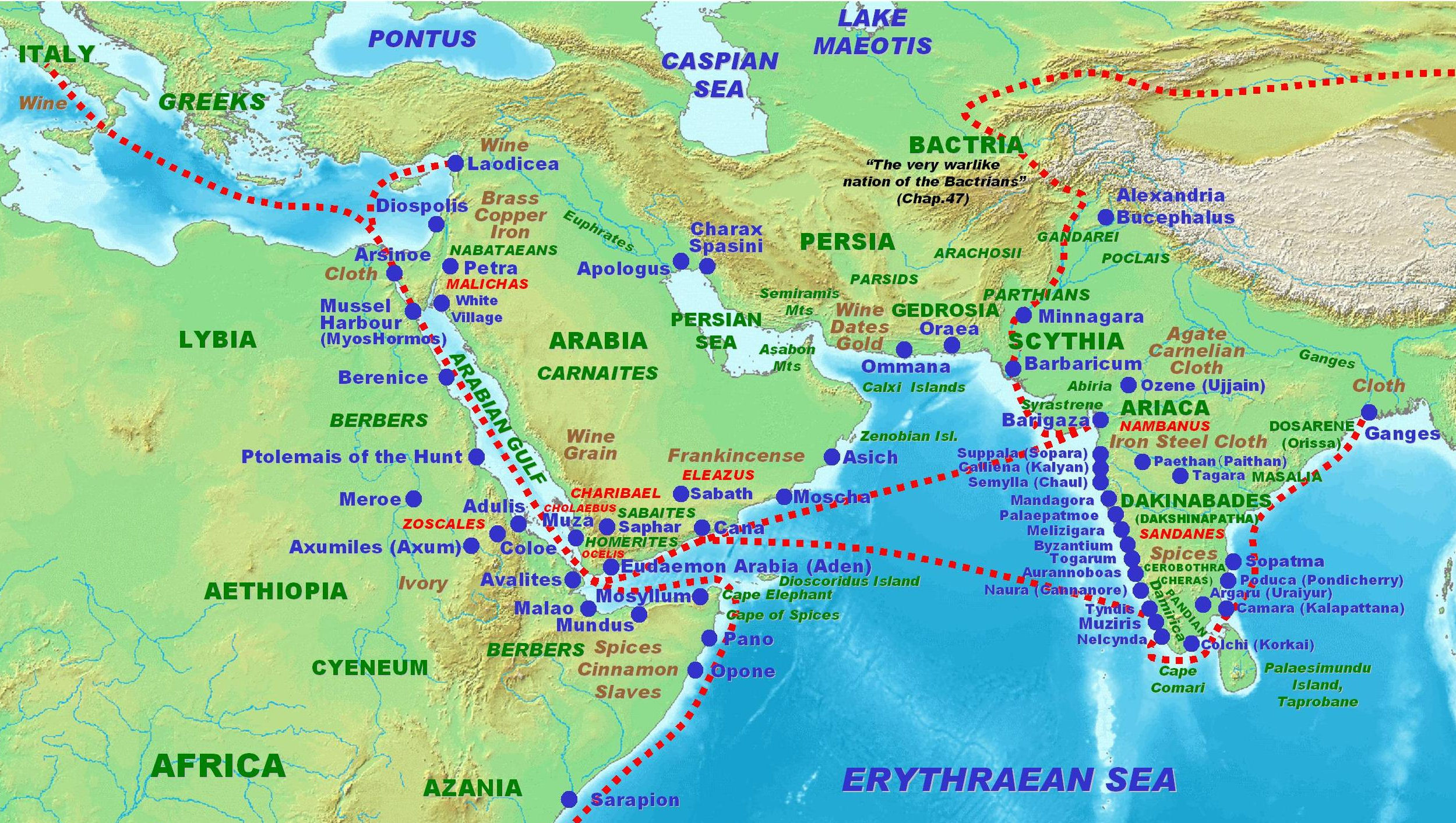
Roman trade with ancient Coastal India according to the Periplus Maris Erythraei 1st century CE.

India is investing approximately $9 billion to transform Great Nicobar Island into a major strategic asset, including a transshipment port, airport, township, and supporting infrastructure. Located just 150 kilometers from the Strait of Malacca — one of the world's busiest shipping corridors — the island's development is seen as a response to China's growing presence in the Indian Ocean, where Beijing has secured port access in Sri Lanka, Pakistan, and Djibouti and regularly deploys submarines and surveillance ships.

=== Environmental impact ===
After weighing the following pros and cons, benefits, risk and mitigation strategies, the project was granted the environmental clearance by the Ministry of Environment, Forest and Climate Change (MoEFCC)'s Expert Appraisal Committee in November 2022.

==== Flora and tree felling ====
The project involves large‑scale diversion of forest land for infrastructure development, including a transshipment terminal, airport, township and associated facilities. According to the Government of India’s response to a parliamentary question, the Ministry of Environment, Forest and Climate Change estimated that approximately **964,000 trees (about 9.64 lakh)** would be affected by tree felling associated with the project’s forest land diversion, based on figures provided by the junior environment minister in 2024. These estimates come from official annexures and responses on the environment ministry’s website, which stated that the number of trees to be felled would be about 852,245, with the figure of less than 964,000 based on the proportion of cleared forest area where felling is envisaged. Some independent scientists have expressed concern that these official estimates may be underestimates, arguing that forest density in parts of Great Nicobar is higher than assumed and that actual tree loss could be significantly greater if denser stands are cleared, potentially affecting millions of trees.

==== Coral ====
The Zoological Survey of India’s (ZSI) 2021 Environmental Impact Assessment (EIA) for the project noted that coral colonies within parts of the proposed construction area would need to be translocated to mitigate impacts. Maps prepared in 2020 by the National Centre for Sustainable Coastal Management (NCSCM), under MoEFCC, showed coral reefs along sections of Great Nicobar’s southern and western coasts, including in Galathea Bay, where a transshipment terminal is proposed. Updated NCSCM maps released in 2021 depicted coral reefs farther offshore and showed a reduced extent of CRZ-IA zones along parts of the coastline.

==== Fauna ====
The Great Nicobar project, located within 10 km radius ecologically sensitive zone near Galthea Bay, threatens rare fauna such as Leatherback sea turtle, salt water crocodile, Nicobar macaque. Like all islands in the region which have been isolated over geological time which have led to the evolution of numerous endemic species, several yet to be discovered and formally named. The "Great Nicobar crake" is an undescribed species of bird as of 2026 while the wolf snake Lycodon irwini was described only in 2025. While the MoEFCC proposed 3 conservation sites on Little Nicobar, Menchal Island and Meroe Island to mitigate risks, the Tribal Council of Campbell Bay opposes these sanctuaries, citing a lack of consultation and their long-standing coexistence with the island's wildlife.

=== Indigenous peoples ===
This project which includes two new planned cities in the region will increase population to over 350,000, which may cause a threat to the indigenous communities. After the environmental clearance by MoEFCC, some experts and researchers expressed concerns to Ministry of Tribal Affairs about vulnerability of indigenous communities on the island. Around 1761 individuals belonging to the indigenous Shompen and Nicobarese tribes live in the island. 853 square kilometres (approximately 92% of the total area) of the Great Nicobar Island is designated as tribal reserve under the Andaman and Nicobar Protection of Aboriginal Tribes Regulation, 1956. This means that the land is meant for exclusive use of the community and others cannot access the area without their express permission. Around 10% of tribal reserve of the island will be affected by this project. Indigenous people live outside the project area and the tribal reserve also falls outside the project area. According to Forest Rights Act, 2006, Shompen people are legal sole authority to preserve the forest reserve.

Survival International, a global NGO campaigning for indigenous rights, has said that the mega-development will put the Shompen at risk of being wiped out. In February 2024, 39 genocide experts from 13 countries warned that the development "will be a death sentence for the Shompen, tantamount to the international crime of genocide". They said that the proposed population increase and exposure to outside populations would lead to mass deaths because the Shompen have little to no immunity to infectious outside diseases. The UN Committee on the Elimination of Racial Discrimination underlined the lack of measures taken to address the "adverse impacts of the development projects on Great Nicobar and Andaman Islands, which threaten the survival of various vulnerable Indigenous / Tribal Peoples, particularly those living in voluntary isolation."

== Present status ==
- January 2023: Bids submitted by vendors for the ₹41,000-crore (US$8 b) mega international container transshipment port (ICTP) at Galathea Bay were opened; phase 1 of the port with 4 million TEUs will be completed by 2028. Ten companies that filled out the Expression of Interest are Adani Ports & SEZ, Container Corporation of India, Essar Ports, JSW Infrastructure, Megha Engineering & Infrastructures, Navayuga Engineering, PDP International, Rail Vikas Nigam, Royal Boskalis, Syama Prasad Mookerjee Port, and Vishwa Samudra Holdings.,
- April 2025: NTPC invited bids for a 5 MW solar power project with battery energy storage capacity of up to 4 to 12 MWh. 7 deep-sea mining blocks off the coast of the Great Nicobar Island were awarded, and the Offshore Areas Mineral Trust as a non-profit autonomous body has been established, which will use the funds received for research and expenditure related to mitigating any adverse impact caused to the ecology in the offshore area due to mining operations. 2 of the total 3 gram panchayats in the project area, Laxminagar and Govindnagar, have also granted permission to the project.

== See also ==
- Tourism in the Andaman and Nicobar Islands
- Channels in Bay of Bengal, Laccadive Sea, and Arabian Sea
- Sea lines of communication
