= Campbell Bay National Park =

National park in Great Nicobar, India

Coordinates: 7°06′46″N 93°45′43″E

- IUCN category II (national park)
- Location within India
- Interactive map of Campbell Bay National Park
- Area: 426 km^{2} (164 sq mi)
- Established: 1992

Campbell Bay National Park is an isolated national park in India, located in the northern part of the island of Great Nicobar, the largest of the Nicobar Islands in the eastern Indian Ocean 190 kilometres (120 mi) to the north of Sumatra. It was gazetted as a national park of India in 1992, and forms part of the Great Nicobar Biosphere Reserve. The climate is humid and warm.

== Geography ==
The park has an area of 426.23 square kilometres (164.57 sq mi), making it the largest park in the Andaman and Nicobar Islands, and is separated from the smaller Galathea National Park by a 12-km wide forest buffer zone. There are coral reefs, beaches and Mount Thullier, at 642 metres (2,106 ft) the highest point on the Nicobar Islands.

== Flora and fauna ==
The flora includes:

- mangroves
- tropical evergreen forests
- tree ferns
- ground orchids

Among the land fauna are the:

- Nicobar long-tailed macaque monkey
- crab-eating macaque
- Nicobar treeshrew
- monitor lizard
- robber crab

Birds include the megapode, Nicobar pigeon and white-bellied sea eagle. Common Mormon and Nicobar crow butterflies also reside in the park.

Marine species include the dugong, leatherback sea turtle and olive ridley sea turtle.

== Climate ==
The following measurements were collected at a single point. The temperature ranges from 27 to 29 °C (81 to 84 °F), averaging 27.8 °C (82.0 °F). Rainfall varies from 2 to 7.2 millimetres (0.079 to 0.283 in) per day.

== Tourism ==
In 2023, tourists and locals were allowed access to Campbell Bay National Park. The park offers a variety of activities, such as nature walks, bird watching and wildlife safaris, snorkeling and diving.

== See also ==
- Andaman and Nicobar Environmental Team
- Society for Andaman and Nicobar Ecology
- Great Nicobar Island Development Project
