= Shompen hut =

- village
- Location in Andaman and Nicobar Islands, India Shompen hut (India)
- Coordinates: 7.013°N 93.932°E
- Country: India
- State: Andaman and Nicobar Islands
- District: Nicobar
- Tehsil: Great Nicobar

Population (2011)
  - Total: 63
- Time zone: UTC+5:30 (IST)
- 2011 census code: 645198

Shompen hut is a village in the Nicobar district of Andaman and Nicobar Islands, India. It is located in the Great Nicobar tehsil.

== History ==
The Shompen Hut complex was built by the Government of India in 1984, at the 27th km point on the East-West road connecting Campbell Bay to Kopen Heat (Copenheat) Nicobarese village. The objective was to provide health, education and other services to the Shompen people. However, members of the Shompen tribe did not visit the complex frequently. A horticultural garden was also developed at the site.

== Demographics ==
According to the 2011 census of India, Shompen hut has 14 households. The effective literacy rate (i.e. the literacy rate of population excluding children aged 6 and below) is 0%.

Demographics (2011 Census)
	Total	Male	Female
Population	63	35	28
Children aged below 6 years	0	0	0
Scheduled caste	0	0	0
Scheduled tribe	63	35	28
Literates	0	0	0
Workers (all)	1	0	1
Main workers (total)	1	0	1
Main workers: Cultivators	0	0	0
Main workers: Agricultural labourers	0	0	0
Main workers: Household industry workers	0	0	0
Main workers: Other	1	0	1
Marginal workers (total)	0	0	0
Marginal workers: Cultivators	0	0	0
Marginal workers: Agricultural labourers	0	0	0
Marginal workers: Household industry workers	0	0	0
Marginal workers: Others	0	0	0
Non-workers	62	35	27
