= 7 km Farm =

- village
- Location in Andaman and Nicobar Islands, India 7 km Farm (India)
- Coordinates: 6.9619°N 93.9225°E
- Country: India
- State: Andaman and Nicobar Islands
- District: Nicobar
- Tehsil: Great Nicobar

Population (2011)
  - Total: 141
- Time zone: UTC+5:30 (IST)
- 2011 census code: 645196

7 km Farm is a village in the Nicobar district of Andaman and Nicobar Islands, India. It is located in the Great Nicobar tehsil.

== Demographics ==
According to the 2011 census of India, 7 km Farm has 37 households. The effective literacy rate (i.e. the literacy rate of population excluding children aged 6 and below) is 83.33%.

Demographics (2011 Census)
	Total	Male	Female
Population	141	72	69
Children aged below 6 years	27	12	15
Scheduled caste	0	0	0
Scheduled tribe	87	42	45
Literates	95	52	43
Workers (all)	49	40	9
Main workers (total)	18	16	2
Main workers: Cultivators	0	0	0
Main workers: Agricultural labourers	0	0	0
Main workers: Household industry workers	0	0	0
Main workers: Other	18	16	2
Marginal workers (total)	31	24	7
Marginal workers: Cultivators	0	0	0
Marginal workers: Agricultural labourers	0	0	0
Marginal workers: Household industry workers	0	0	0
Marginal workers: Others	31	24	7
Non-workers	92	32	60
