= Pattia =

Coordinates: 27°22′N 79°29′E

Pattia Pulopattia / Patia
- village
- Location in Andaman and Nicobar Islands, India Pattia (India)
- Country: India
- State: Andaman and Nicobar Islands
- District: Nicobar
- Tehsil: Great Nicobar

Population (2011)
  - Total: 11
- Time zone: UTC+5:30 (IST)
- 2011 census code: 645155

Pattia, also known as Pulopattia, is a village in the Nicobar district of Andaman and Nicobar Islands, India. It is located in the Great Nicobar tehsil.

== Demographics ==
According to the 2011 census of India, Pattia has 2 households. The effective literacy rate (i.e. the literacy rate of population excluding children aged 6 and below) is 10%.

Demographics (2011 Census)
	Total	Male	Female
Population	11	8	3
Children aged below 6 years	1	0	1
Scheduled caste	0	0	0
Scheduled tribe	11	8	3
Literates	1	1	0
Workers (all)	0	0	0
Main workers (total)	0	0	0
Main workers: Cultivators	0	0	0
Main workers: Agricultural labourers	0	0	0
Main workers: Household industry workers	0	0	0
Main workers: Other	0	0	0
Marginal workers (total)	0	0	0
Marginal workers: Cultivators	0	0	0
Marginal workers: Agricultural labourers	0	0	0
Marginal workers: Household industry workers	0	0	0
Marginal workers: Others	0	0	0
Non-workers	11	8	3
