= Lanaya =

- village
- Country: India
- State: Andaman and Nicobar Islands
- District: Nicobar
- Tehsil: Great Nicobar

Population (2011)
  - Total: 4
- Time zone: UTC+5:30 (IST)
- Census code: 645210

Lanaya is a village in the Nicobar district of Andaman and Nicobar Islands, India. It is located in the Great Nicobar tehsil.

== Demographics ==
According to the 2011 census of India, Lanaya has only 1 household. The effective literacy rate (i.e. the literacy rate of population excluding children aged 6 and below) is 50%.

Demographics (2011 Census)
	Total	Male	Female
Population	4	2	2
Children aged below 6 years	0	0	0
Scheduled caste	0	0	0
Scheduled tribe	4	2	2
Literates	2	2	0
Workers (all)	0	0	0
Non-workers	4	2	2
