= Patisang =

- village
- Country: India
- State: Andaman and Nicobar Islands
- District: Nicobar
- Tehsil: Great Nicobar

Population (2011)
  - Total: 13
- Time zone: UTC+5:30 (IST)
- Census code: 645209

Patisang is a village in the Nicobar district of Andaman and Nicobar Islands, India. It is located in the Great Nicobar tehsil.

== Demographics ==
According to the 2011 census of India, Patisang has 2 households. The effective literacy rate (i.e. the literacy rate of population excluding children aged 6 and below) is 18.18%.

Demographics (2011 Census)
| | Total | Male | Female |
|---|---|---|---|
| Population | 13 | 5 | 8 |
| Children aged below 6 years | 2 | 1 | 1 |
| Scheduled caste | 0 | 0 | 0 |
| Scheduled tribe | 13 | 5 | 8 |
| Literates | 2 | 2 | 0 |
| Workers (all) | 0 | 0 | 0 |
| Main workers (total) | 0 | 0 | 0 |
| Main workers: Cultivators | 0 | 0 | 0 |
| Main workers: Agricultural labourers | 0 | 0 | 0 |
| Main workers: Household industry workers | 0 | 0 | 0 |
| Main workers: Other | 0 | 0 | 0 |
| Marginal workers (total) | 0 | 0 | 0 |
| Marginal workers: Cultivators | 0 | 0 | 0 |
| Marginal workers: Agricultural labourers | 0 | 0 | 0 |
| Marginal workers: Household industry workers | 0 | 0 | 0 |
| Marginal workers: Others | 0 | 0 | 0 |
| Non-workers | 13 | 5 | 8 |
