= Katahu =

- village
- Country: India
- State: Andaman and Nicobar Islands
- District: Nicobar
- Tehsil: Great Nicobar

Population (2011)
  - Total: 2
- Time zone: UTC+5:30 (IST)
- Census code: 645165

Katahu is a village in the Nicobar district of Andaman and Nicobar Islands, India. It is located in the Great Nicobar tehsil.

== Demographics ==
According to the 2011 census of India, Katahu has only 1 household. The effective literacy rate (i.e. the literacy rate of population excluding children aged 6 and below) is 0%.

Demographics (2011 Census)
	Total	Male	Female
Population	2	1	1
Children aged below 6 years	0	0	0
Scheduled caste	0	0	0
Scheduled tribe	2	1	1
Literates	0	0	0
Workers (all)	2	1	1
Main workers (total)	2	1	1
Main workers: Cultivators	0	0	0
Main workers: Agricultural labourers	0	0	0
Main workers: Household industry workers	0	0	0
Main workers: Other	2	1	1
Marginal workers: Others	0	0	0
Non-workers	0	0	0
