= Gandhi Nagar, Great Nicobar =

Gandhi Nagar
- village
- Location in Andaman and Nicobar Islands, India Gandhi Nagar (India)
- Country: India
- State: Andaman and Nicobar Islands
- District: Nicobar
- Tehsil: Great Nicobar

Population (2011)
  - Total: 69
- Time zone: UTC+5:30 (IST)
- 2011 census code: 645192

Gandhi Nagar is a village in the Nicobar district of Andaman and Nicobar Islands, India. It is located in the Great Nicobar tehsil.

== Demographics ==
According to the 2011 census of India, Gandhi Nagar has 13 households. The effective literacy rate (i.e. the literacy rate of population excluding children aged 6 and below) is 69.12%.

Demographics (2011 Census)
	Total	Male	Female
Population	69	62	7
Children aged below 6 years	1	1	0
Scheduled caste	0	0	0
Scheduled tribe	0	0	0
Literates	47	43	4
Workers (all)	64	60	4
Main workers (total)	56	55	1
Main workers: Cultivators	0	0	0
Main workers: Agricultural labourers	6	6	0
Main workers: Household industry workers	0	0	0
Main workers: Other	50	49	1
Marginal workers (total)	8	5	3
Marginal workers: Cultivators	0	0	0
Marginal workers: Agricultural labourers	4	3	1
Marginal workers: Household industry workers	0	0	0
Marginal workers: Others	4	2	2
Non-workers	5	2	3
