= Bewai/Kuwak =

- village
- Country: India
- State: Andaman and Nicobar Islands
- District: Nicobar
- Tehsil: Great Nicobar

Population (2011)
  - Total: 4
- Time zone: UTC+5:30 (IST)
- 2011 census code: 645148

Bewai/Kuwak is a village in the Nicobar district of Andaman and Nicobar Islands, India. It is located in the Great Nicobar tehsil.

== Demographics ==
According to the 2011 census of India (conducted 7 years after the 2004 Indian Ocean earthquake and tsunami), Bewai/Kuwak has only 1 household left, with 4 people. The effective literacy rate (i.e. the literacy rate of population excluding children aged 6 and below) is 50%.

Demographics (2011 Census)
	Total	Male	Female
Population	4	3	1
Children aged below 6 years	0	0	0
Scheduled caste	0	0	0
Scheduled tribe	4	3	1
Literates	2	2	0
Workers (all)	4	3	1
Main workers (total)	4	3	1
Main workers: Cultivators	0	0	0
Main workers: Agricultural labourers	0	0	0
Main workers: Household industry workers	0	0	0
Main workers: Other	4	3	1
