= Great Nicobar Biosphere Reserve =

Reserve on the island of Great Nicobar

Coordinates: 7.0500°N 93.7750°E

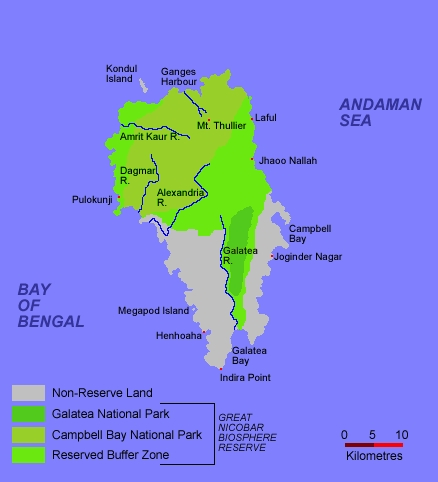
The Great Nicobar Biosphere Reserve

The Great Nicobar Biosphere Reserve encompasses a large part (some 85%) of the island of Great Nicobar, the largest of the Nicobar Islands in the Indian Union Territory of Andaman and Nicobar Islands. The Nicobars lie in the Bay of Bengal in the eastern Indian Ocean, 190 km (120 mi) to the north of the Indonesian island of Sumatra. The reserve has a total core area of approximately 885 km^{2}, surrounded by a 12 km-wide "forest buffer zone". In year 2013 it was included in the list of Man and Biosphere program of UNESCO to promote sustainable development based on local community effort and sound science.

== Geography ==
The reserve was formally created in January 2013. It incorporates two National parks of India, which were gazetted in 1992: the larger Campbell Bay National Park on the northern part of the island, and Galathea National Park in the southern interior. The non-Biosphere portions of the island (set aside for agriculture, forestry and settlements) are confined to the southwestern and southeastern coastal reaches.

The reserve has a total area of 103,870 ha. The core area of 53,623 ha comprises Cambell Bay and Galathea national parks. A buffer area of 34,877 ha includes forested lands adjacent to and between the two parks. There is also a transitional area of 10,070 ha, including 5,300 marine hectares.

== Flora and fauna ==
The environment is classified by the World Wide Fund for Nature as a tropical and subtropical moist broadleaf forests biome, and located in the Indomalayan realm.

The reserve is home to many species of plants and animals, often endemic to the Andaman and Nicobars biogeographic region. In terms of fauna, there are over 1800 species in this biosphere reserve, some of which include: Nicobar scrubfowl (Megapodius nicobariensis, a megapode bird), the edible-nest swiftlet (Aerodramus fuciphagus), the Nicobar long-tailed macaque (Macaca fascicularis umbrosa), saltwater crocodile (Crocodylus porosus), Andaman water monitor (Varanus salvator andamanensis), giant leatherback sea turtle (Dermochelys coriacea), Malayan box turtle (Cuora amboinensis), Nicobar tree shrew (Tupaia nicobarica), reticulated python (Python reticulatus) and the giant robber crab (or coconut crab, Birgus latro).

== Indigenous inhabitants ==
The Great Nicobar Biosphere Reserve also incorporates territories and traditional lands of the indigenous Nicobarese and Shompen people.

== See also ==
- Endemic birds of the Andaman and Nicobar Islands
- Fauna of India
- Flora of India
- Indian Council of Forestry Research and Education
- Wildlife of India
