= Alexandera River =

Alexandera River Alexandra River
- village
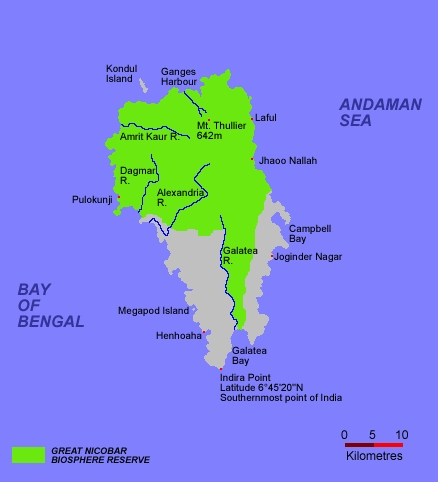
- The settlement is named after the Alexandera (or Alexandria) river, seen in this map of the Great Nicobar Island

- Location in Andaman and Nicobar Islands, India Alexandera River (India)
- Coordinates: 7°00′N 93°44′E
- Country: India
- State: Andaman and Nicobar Islands
- District: Nicobar
- Tehsil: Great Nicobar

Population (2011)
  - Total: 47
- Time zone: UTC+5:30 (IST)
- 2011 census code: 645168

Alexandera River is a village in the Nicobar district of Andaman and Nicobar Islands, India. It is located in the Great Nicobar tehsil.

== Demographics ==
According to the 2011 census of India, Alexandera River has 13 households. The effective literacy rate (i.e. the literacy rate of population excluding children aged 6 and below) is 0%.

Demographics (2011 Census)
	Total	Male	Female
Population	47	28	19
Children aged below 6 years	0	0	0
Scheduled caste	0	0	0
Scheduled tribe	47	28	19
Literates	0	0	0
Workers (all)	0	0	0
Main workers (total)	0	0	0
Main workers: Cultivators	0	0	0
Main workers: Agricultural labourers	0	0	0
Main workers: Household industry workers	0	0	0
Main workers: Other	0	0	0
Marginal workers (total)	0	0	0
Marginal workers: Cultivators	0	0	0
Marginal workers: Agricultural labourers	0	0	0
Marginal workers: Household industry workers	0	0	0
Marginal workers: Others	0	0	0
Non-workers	47	28	19
