= Galathea National Park =

National park in the Andaman and Nicobar Islands, India

Coordinates: 6.923°N 93.833°E

- IUCN category II (national park)
- Location within India
- Interactive map of Galathea National Park
- Location: Andaman and Nicobar Islands
- Area: 110
- Established: 1992

Galathea National Park is a national park located in the Union Territory of Andaman and Nicobar Islands, India. It is located on the island of Great Nicobar in the Nicobar Islands, which lie in the eastern Indian Ocean (Bay of Bengal). Many unique and rare species of plants and animals are found in the park, several of which (owing to their relative geographical isolation) are endemic to the islands.

== Etymology ==
The Galathea National Park is named after the Danish colonial vessel Galathea, which conducted survey for minerals in Great Nicobar in 1845-47.

== History ==
The Great Nicobar Island Biosphere Reserve was declared by the government in 1989, and was recognised as UNESCO Biosphere Reserves in 2013.

== Geoclimate ==
=== Geography ===
The total area of this park is approximately 110 square kilometres, and was gazetted as a National Park of India in 1992. Galathea forms part of what has been designated as the Great Nicobar Biosphere Reserve, which also includes the larger Campbell Bay National Park, separated from Galathea by a 12-km forest buffer zone.

=== Climate ===
There is an acute tropical climate here, with only the summer season and monsoons; the inhabitants of the park here have never encountered winter conditions.

During the rainy season, an average of 3000–3800 mm of rain per square meter falls here.

== Ecology ==
=== Flora ===
Galathea National Park, due to its geographical surroundings and physical location, is considered to have the world's best-preserved tropical rainforests and a large number of endemics. The vegetation consists largely of tropical and subtropical moist broadleaf forests.

=== Fauna ===
Notable animal species found in the park include the giant robber crab, megapode, and Nicobar pigeon.

From February to December, the largest turtle in the world, the leather back turtle (Dermochelys coriacea), nests here.

== Transport ==
Veer Savarkar International Airport at Port Blair is the nearest civil aviation airport on another Island. There are daily flights to and from Port Blair to Chennai and Kolkata, which have approximately 2 hours flight time each.

== Issues ==
The Great Nicobar Island is at risk of being developed into a Military and trading hub by the Indian government as part of the Great Nicobar Development Plan. The 9 billion dollar project will include the construction of the International Container Transshipment Port; upgrade of Campbell Bay to a dual-use airport for military and civilian purposes; a gas, diesel, and solar-based power plant; and a greenfield township on the 1,000-square-kilometer island. These developments would also boost the island's population into the hundreds of thousands.

== Gallery ==
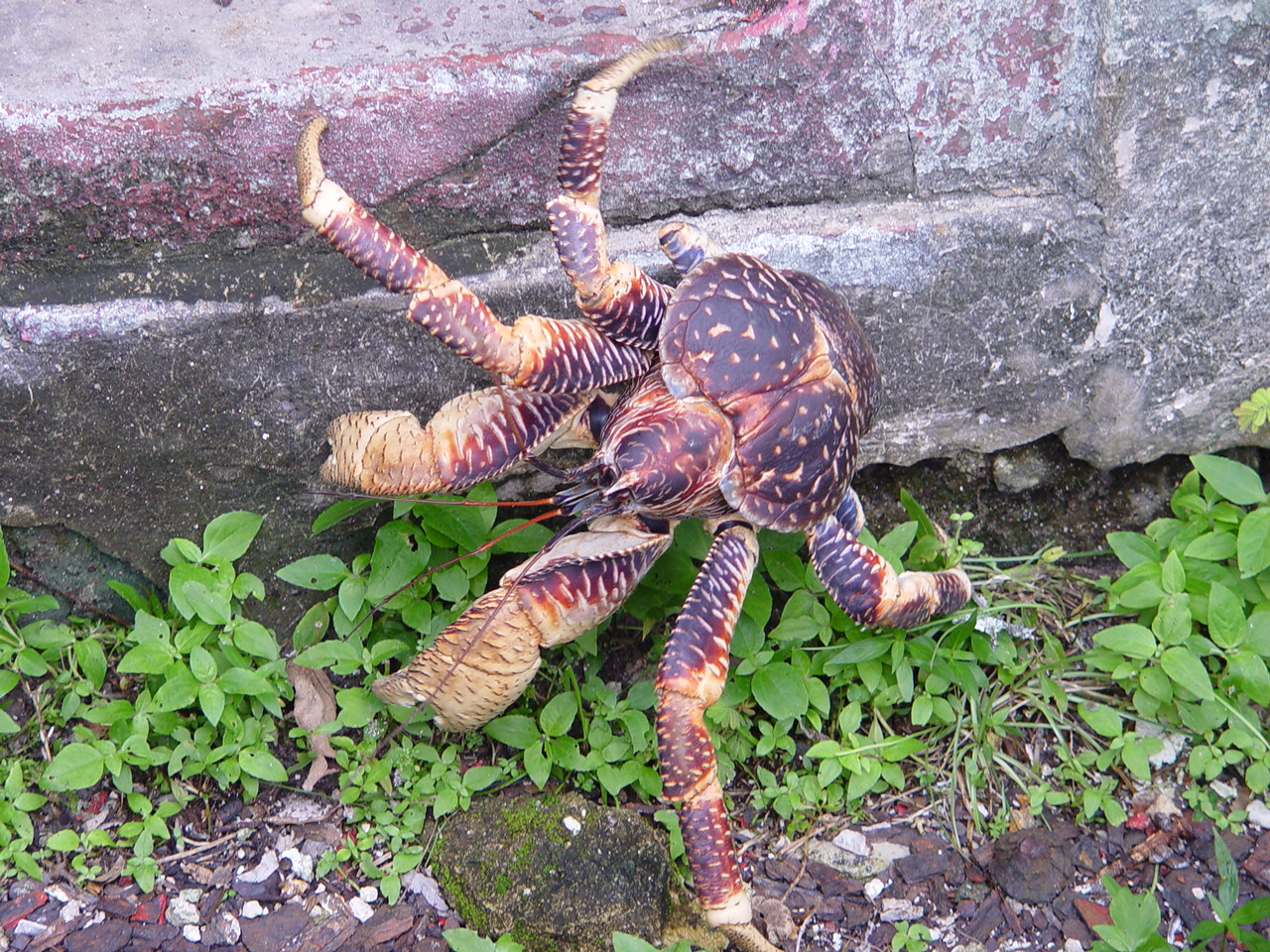
The Giant robber crab, or Coconut crab.

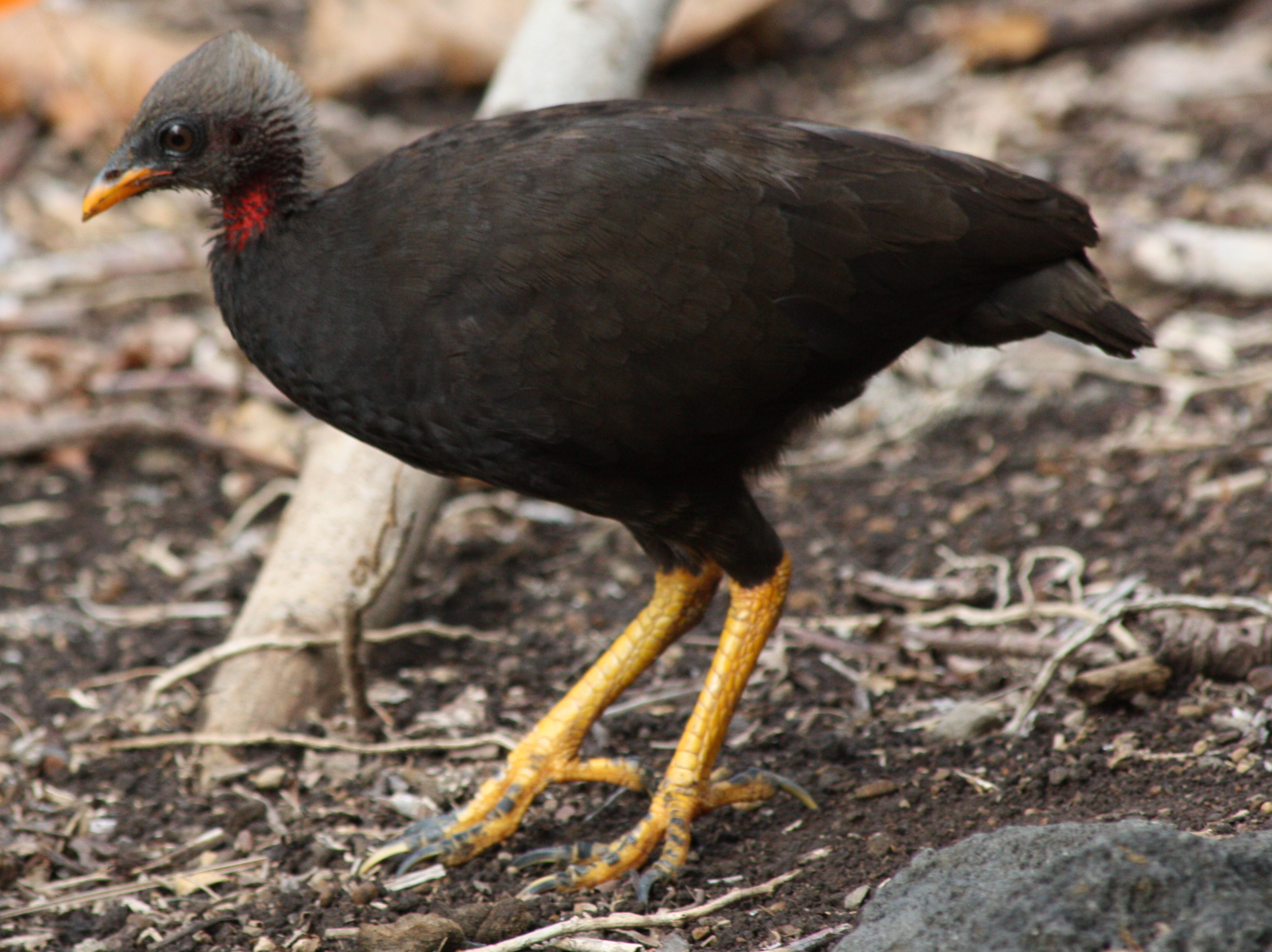
A megapode bird.

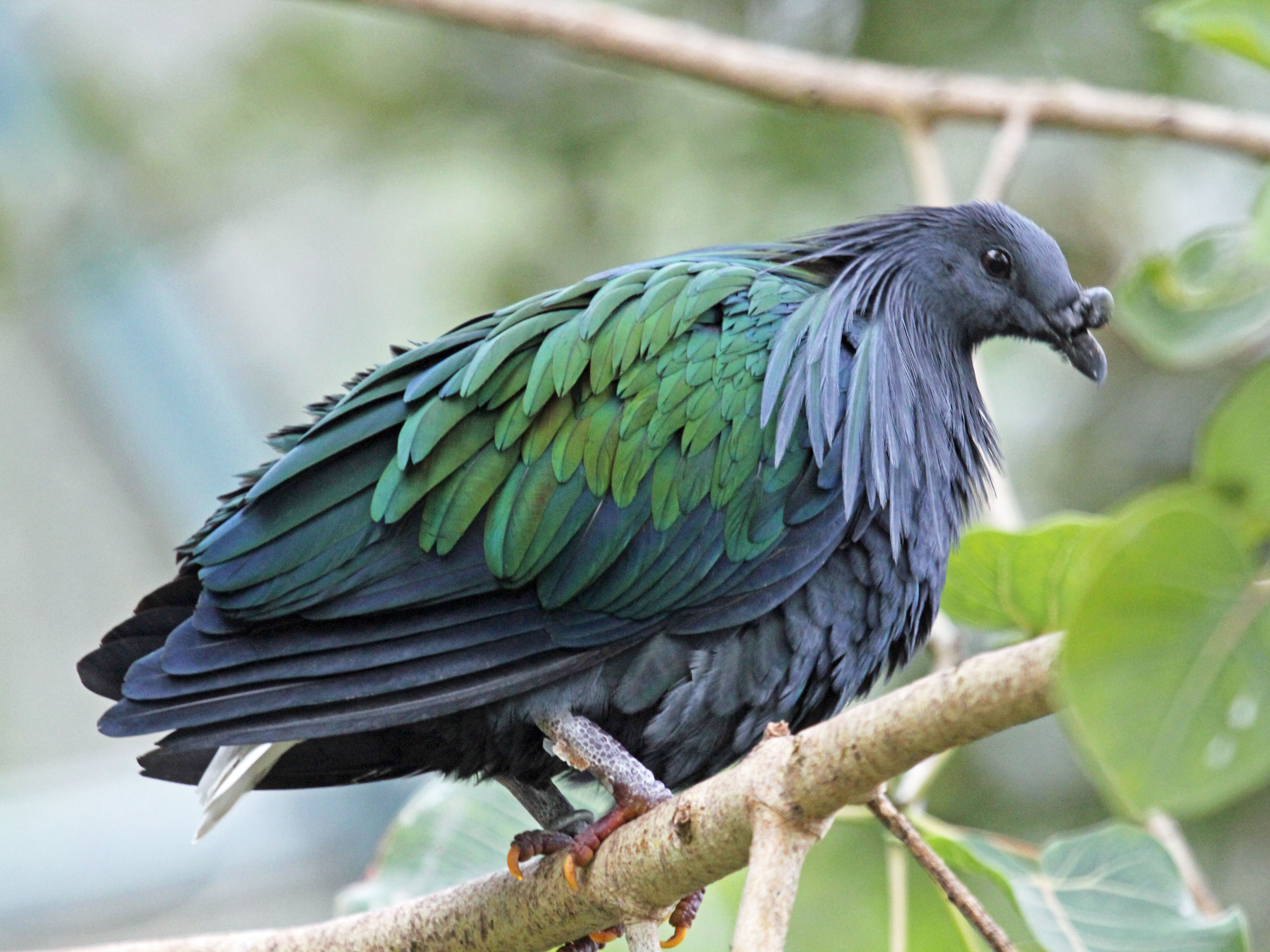
Nicobar pigeon in the national park.

== See also ==
- Andaman and Nicobar Environmental Team
- International Container Transshipment Port, Galathea Bay
- Society for Andaman and Nicobar Ecology
