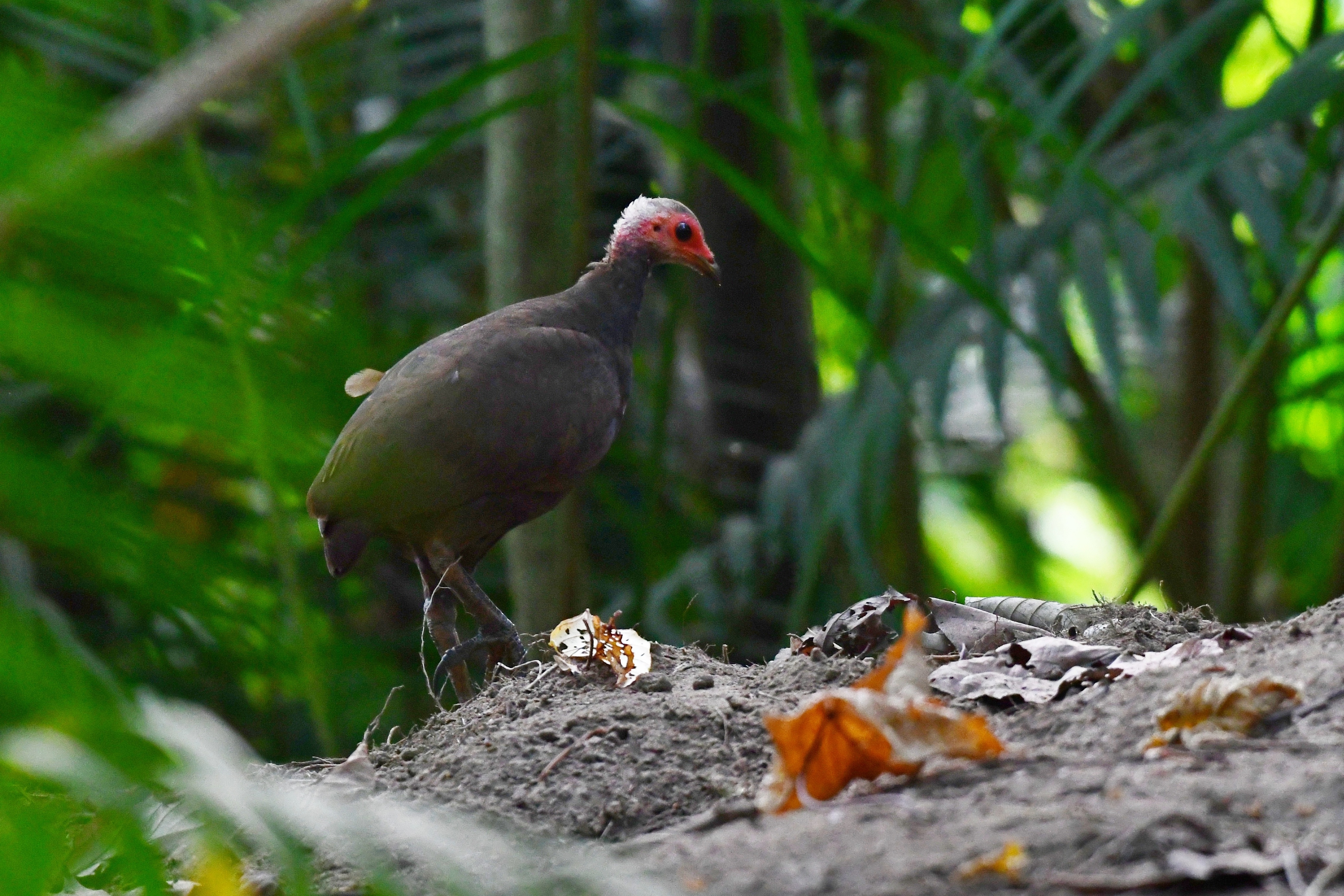

Conservation status
- Vulnerable (IUCN 3.1)

Scientific classification
- Kingdom: Animalia
- Phylum: Chordata
- Class: Aves
- Order: Galliformes
- Family: Megapodiidae
- Genus: Megapodius
- Species: M. nicobariensis

Binomial name
- Megapodius nicobariensis Blyth, 1846

Subspecies
- M. n. abbotti (Oberholser, 1919); M. n. nicobariensis (Blyth, 1846)
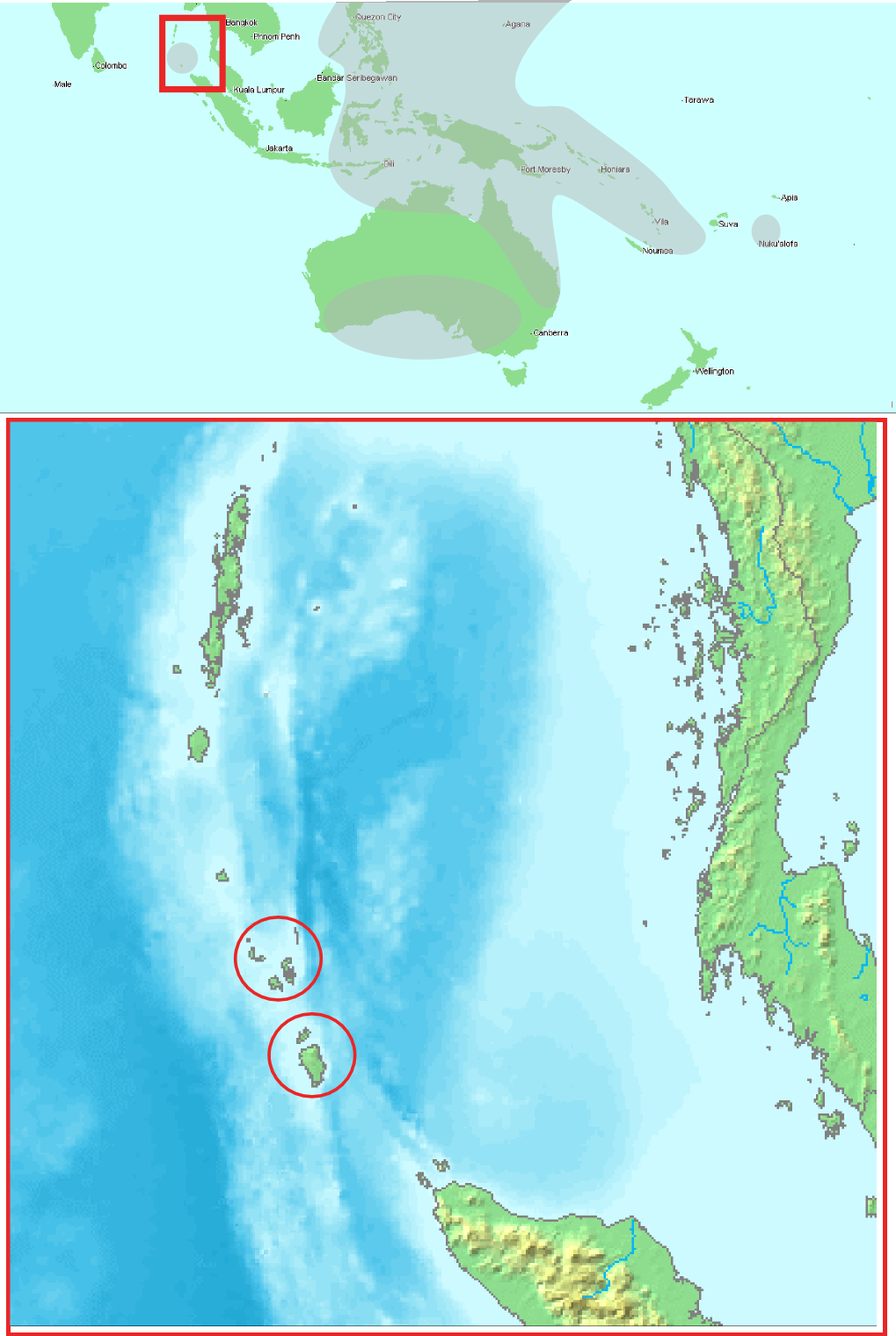
- Distribution of Nicobar megapode, grey area shows the distribution range of other megapodes

= Nicobar megapode =

Species of bird

The Nicobar megapode or Nicobar scrubfowl (Megapodius nicobariensis) is a megapode endemic to the Nicobar Islands of India. Like other megapodes, it builds a large mound nest of soil and vegetation, with the eggs incubated by the heat produced by decomposition. Newly hatched chicks climb out of the loose soil of the mound and, being fully feathered, are capable of flight. The Nicobar Islands lie on the western edge of the megapode distribution, well separated from the nearest ranges of other megapode species. The 2004 Indian Ocean tsunami reduced the global population by an estimated 66–75% and completely submerged Megapode Island; the species is now considered globally Vulnerable under IUCN criteria A1bc; D1, with a stable but small post-tsunami population.

== Description ==
Megapodes are so named for their large feet, and like others in the group this species is fowl-like with dark brown plumage, a short tail and large feet and claws. The tarsus is bare with the hind toe situated on the same level as the front toes, unlike those of other Galliform birds, enabling them to grasp objects better than other game birds. The tarsus has broad flat strip-like scales on the front. The tail is short with twelve feathers. The head is more grey with a rufous crest and bare reddish facial skin. The males and females are very similar but the male is dark brown overall while the female has more grey on the underparts. Young birds have a fully feathered face, and hatchlings are small and quail-like with rufous barring on the wings and back. The nominate subspecies is paler than abbotti from the islands south of the Sombrero Channel.

== Taxonomy and systematics ==
This species was collected by Reverend Jean Pierre Barbe and described by Edward Blyth in 1846. Some workers have considered it a subspecies of the dusky megapode (Megapodius freycinet). The exact island from which the original type specimen came was not known, and a later specimen from Trinket Island, described as Megapodius trinkutensis, is now considered indistinguishable from the nominate subspecies. In 1901, W. L. Abbott collected specimens from Little Nicobar which were described in 1919 by H. C. Oberholser as a new subspecies abbotti, distinguished by its darker brown plumage.

== Distribution ==
The species is found only in the Nicobar Islands. Its range is so well separated from the main megapode distribution (especially of the genus Megapodius) that in 1911 it was suggested, on the basis that many megapodes were domesticated and transported by native islanders, that the species may have been introduced to the Nicobars. Late 19th-century reports of the species from Great Coco and Table Island in the Andaman Islands have been suggested, but lack corroborating evidence.

The nominate subspecies occurs on the islands north of the Sombrero Channel – Tillangchong, Bompuka (Bompoka), Teressa, Camorta, Trinket, Nancowry and Katchal – while abbotti occurs to the south, on Meroe, Trak, Treis, Menchal, Little Nicobar, Kondul, Great Nicobar and Megapode Island. There was an apparent sighting of a pair on Cubra Island in May 2009 and records from Pilo Milo in May 2011, an island where the species was thought to have been extirpated. The total extent of occurrence is estimated at about 8,700 km².

The eggs as well as adults are sought after by indigenous islanders for food, and birds may historically have been transported across islands. The 19th-century ornithologist Allan Octavian Hume considered the taste of the meat as being between that of a "fat Norfolk turkey and a fat Norfolk pheasant".

== Behaviour and ecology ==
Nicobar megapodes are secretive in their habits. During the day, they move around in thick jungle adjacent to the sea shore. After dark, they venture out on the shore. They move in pairs or small groups, which may include just-hatched birds. When disturbed they prefer to escape by running but take to wing when pressed. The group keeps in touch with cackling calls. Pairs engage in duet calling and maintain territories. Many species in the genus are reported to be monogamous, but the Nicobar megapode has been found to form only temporary pair bonds.

The species has an omnivorous diet. It forages mainly by scratching and raking debris on the ground with its feet. A study on Great Nicobar found that its diet was dominated by the seeds of Macaranga peltata, followed by insects, snails, crustaceans and reptiles; the birds also ingest grit to aid digestion and have been observed drinking rainwater.

Like other megapodes in the genus, it builds a large mound nest, generally close to the coast. The mounds are constructed from coral sand containing minute shells, leaves, twigs and other plant debris. Mounds are built on open ground, against a fallen log or tree stump, or against a large living tree. They are generally re-used: the top layer of sand is scraped away, fresh vegetation piled in, and a new sand layer raked over. A mound may be shared by a pair and their progeny, or by more than one pair. Mound size varies considerably (from less than 1 m³ to more than 10 m³), although size does not influence hatching success. Larger mounds tend to have more stable incubation temperatures and the shortest incubation period (about 72 days). Annual hatching success fluctuates widely, from 87% in 1996 to 37% in 1997. Peak egg laying occurs from February to May. The eggs are pinkish, without markings or gloss, elongate-elliptical and at a sixth of the weight of the bird relatively large; their colour fades with age. On average four to five eggs are laid in a mound, though up to ten have been recorded, often at very different stages of development. Microbial activity is the primary source of incubation heat within mounds; the incubation period ranges from about 70 to 80 days depending on temperature.

The young hatch fully feathered and, once their feathers dry, can fly. They receive no parental care and join groups immediately. In the 1900s, eggs taken to Calcutta Zoo hatched and the chicks, reared on a diet of termites, grew very tame.

== Population and conservation status ==
The Nicobar megapode has been listed as Vulnerable continuously since 1994. In the 2021 IUCN Red List assessment (version 2021-3) the criteria were changed to A1bc; D1, reflecting the 2004 Indian Ocean tsunami as a single, large, one-off population reduction rather than the continuing decline previously inferred.

A 1994 survey by Sankaran estimated 2,318–4,056 breeding pairs, roughly 4,500–8,000 mature individuals, based on transects along coastal habitat. Following the December 2004 tsunami, a 2006 survey by Sivakumar using the same methodology recorded 394 active mounds and an estimated 788 breeding pairs – a reduction of 66%, or up to 81% if the smaller post-tsunami mound sizes are taken into account. Mound losses were comparable in the two subspecies (about 69% in M. n. nicobariensis and 65% in M. n. abbotti). Follow-up surveys in 2009–2011 estimated 376–752 breeding pairs, indicating that the population was at best stable since 2006.

Surveys by the Zoological Survey of India between 2015 and 2018 recorded 149 active mounds and detected about 300 megapodes through point-transect and playback methods, with the species still present on all seven islands of the Nancowry group; for M. n. abbotti across the southern islands, 97 active mounds were documented. The current IUCN estimate of 750–1,500 mature individuals is treated as stable, though the species has not been comprehensively re-surveyed at the all-island scale since 2011.

=== Impact of the 2004 tsunami ===
Megapode Island, which gave the species one of its English names, was completely submerged by the December 2004 tsunami, and all coastal areas on Trax Island were inundated; the species has not been recorded on either island since. Post-tsunami surveys also found that the distribution of nest mounds had shifted closer to the shoreline, potentially increasing exposure to abnormally high tides and altering incubation temperatures. The aftermath of the tsunami also intensified pressure on littoral forests, as displaced communities established plantations and built houses in habitat formerly used by the species.

=== Threats ===
Loss of coastal forest through conversion to coconut, banana and cashew plantations, expansion of rice paddies, settlement growth, and the development of roads, airstrips and defence installations are continuing pressures, with Global Forest Watch reporting a 5.5% loss of forest cover across the Nicobars between 2000 and 2019, including damage from the tsunami. A 2020 proposal to develop Great Nicobar as a transhipment port, including a dry dock and refuelling terminal near the mouth of the Galathea River, would affect an important nesting area for M. n. abbotti. Snaring, shooting for food and egg collection are localised pressures, increased by post-tsunami food insecurity; hunting by mainland visitors has decreased under stricter law enforcement, but the growing availability of air guns among indigenous communities is an emerging concern. Sand mining for cement production affects coastal habitat, and feral cats and dogs pose a potential threat through predation.

The species was identified by Radley et al. (2018) as the megapode at greatest risk from climate change, principally through projected sea-level rise reducing littoral nesting habitat and increasing the frequency of extreme storm events.

=== Conservation actions ===
The Nicobar megapode is listed in Schedule I of the Indian Wildlife Protection Act, 1972, and is one of fifteen threatened species prioritised by the Government of India for a Species Recovery Plan under the Integrated Development of Wildlife Habitats programme. Major protected areas holding the species include Campbell Bay National Park and Galathea National Park on Great Nicobar (part of the Great Nicobar Biosphere Reserve), together with three small wildlife sanctuaries on uninhabited islands. Designation of most of the Nicobars as tribal areas legally restricts commercial exploitation of natural resources and non-tribal settlement. Two Important Bird Areas totalling about 1,420 km² have been identified for the species, covering Great Nicobar/Little Nicobar and the Tillangchong–Camorta–Katchal–Nancowry–Trinkat cluster.

== Other sources ==
- Sivakumar, K. (2000) A study on the breeding biology of the Nicobar megapode Megapodius nicobariensis. PhD Thesis, Bharathiar University, Coimbatore, India.
- Sivakumar, K. (2007) The Nicobar megapode: Status, ecology and conservation: Aftermath tsunami Wildlife Institute of India, Dehra Dun.
