= Port Blair Port =

- Click on the map for a fullscreen view

Location
- Country: India
- Location: Port Blair11°40′60.00″N .00″E
- Coordinates: 11.4060°N 92.4500°E

Details
- Operated by: Port Blair Port Trust
- Owned by: Ministry of Shipping, Government of India

Port Blair Port is a seaport in South Andaman district of Andaman and Nicobar, India, near the city of Port Blair on the Andaman Sea. It was a former Major Port of India.

== Classification ==
From 2010 to 2017, it held the status of a Major Port. On 1 June 2010, the Government of India notified Port Blair Port as India's 13th Major Port and constituted the Port Blair Port Trust, with provisions of the Major Port Trusts Act, 1963. The government also declared that the Port Blair Port would have territorial jurisdiction over 23 other ports in Andaman and Nicobar, including East Island Port, Mayabunder Port, Elphinston Harbour Rangat Port, Havelock Port, Neil Island Port, Chowra Port, Teressa Port and Nancowry Harbour Port. However, the government decided to remove its status as a Major Port in 2017.

== Infrastructure facilities ==
The harbor of this port is natural. The Anchorage depth of the port is 12.5m-13.7m and Oil terminal depth of the port is 7.1m - 9.1m. 500 meter long ship can Anchoraged in the port.

== See also ==
- International Container Transshipment Terminal, Great Nicobar Island
- Campbell Bay Port
