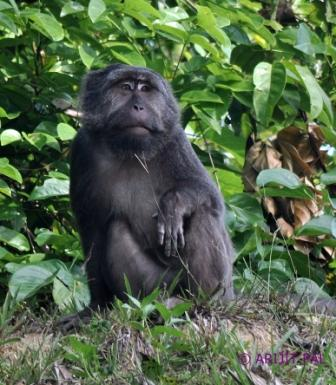
- Nicobar long-tailed macaque in Nicobar Islands, India

Conservation status
- Vulnerable (IUCN 3.1)

Scientific classification
- Kingdom: Animalia
- Phylum: Chordata
- Class: Mammalia
- Order: Primates
- Family: Cercopithecidae
- Genus: Macaca
- Species: M. fascicularis
- Subspecies: M. f. umbrosa

Trinomial name
- Macaca fascicularis umbrosa Miller, 1902

= Nicobar long-tailed macaque =

Subspecies of Old World monkey

The Nicobar long-tailed macaque (Macaca fascicularis umbrosa), popularly known as the Nicobar monkey, is a subspecies of the crab-eating macaque (M. fascicularis), endemic to the Nicobar Islands in the Bay of Bengal. This primate is found on three of the Nicobar Islands—Great Nicobar, Little Nicobar and Katchal—in biome regions consisting of tropical and subtropical moist broadleaf forests.

== Description ==
The Nicobar long-tailed macaque has brownish to grey fur, with lighter colouration on its undersides. Its face is pinkish-brown, with white colour spots on its eyelids. Infants are born with a dark natal coating, which lightens as they reach maturity, which occurs at about one year of age. The gestational period is five-and-a-half months. Adult males are roughly one-and-a-half times larger than the females, and can measure up to 64 centimetres (2 ft) in height, and weigh up to 8 kilograms (18 lb). The males also have larger canine teeth than the females. The tail is longer than the head-to-rump height. Like other macaques it possesses cheek pouches in which it can store food temporarily, and transport it away from the foraging site to be eaten in shelter and safety. In captivity it can have a lifespan of up to approximately thirty years, however in the wild this is much shorter.

== Distribution ==
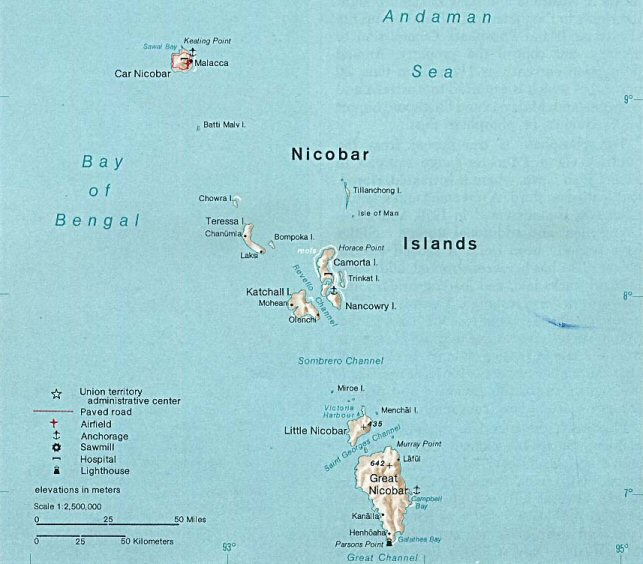
The Nicobar Islands, three of which—Great Nicobar, Little Nicobar, and Katchal Island—provide the natural habitat for these macaques

A 2003 study identified some 788 groups of this subspecies in the wild across the three islands, in group sizes averaging 36 individuals, although groups of up to 56 were recorded. The groups are composed of multiple adult males and females, together with their immature offspring. Adult females in a group outnumbered the adult males by a general ratio of 4:1, with the ratio of immature young macaques to adult females being near-equal, indicative of a healthy population replenishment.

Apart from these populations in the wild, only a single group (as of 2002) of some 17 individuals is held in an Indian zoo for captivity breeding and research purposes.

Populations of this subspecies are particularly noted in the Great Nicobar Biosphere Reserve, and its two constituent National parks of India, Campbell Bay National Park and Galathea National Park. Although these regions are protected areas, and the animal is classified as a Schedule I animal under India's 1972 Wildlife (Protection) Act, the increasing encroachment of settlements and farmlands in adjoining areas of the southeastern part of the island has led to some problems with the local inhabitants. Bands of Nicobar long-tailed macaques have been reported as damaging the settlers' crops, and a few macaques have been illegally killed. In particular, they are sometimes hunted or trapped to protect coconut plantations.

crab-eating macaques on Great Nicobar have long been hunted for subsistence by the indigenous Shompen peoples of Great Nicobar, although they do not form a substantial part of their diet.

As with other primates whose habitats overlap with or are encroached upon by human settlement activities, there is some risk of zoonotic disease transference to individuals who come into close contact with them. One 1984 study has identified their susceptibility to malarial parasites.

== Habitat ==
Its preferred habitat includes mangroves, other coastal forests and riverine environments; however it is also found in inland forests at altitudes of up to 600 metres (2,000 ft) above mean sea level The highest point in the Nicobars, Mount Thullier on Great Nicobar, is some 642 metres (2,106 ft) high. In particular, areas of forest with trees of sp. Pandanus are favoured. Bands of these macaques living in coastal zones tend towards a more terrestrial existence and spend less time living in the trees than do the more arboreal populations of the inland forest zones. Each band has a favoured territory, preferentially close to a water source, over which they roam; this territory measures some 1.25 square kilometres (310 acres) on average.

== Behaviour ==
The Nicobar long-tailed macaque is a frugivore, with its principal diet consisting of fruits and nuts. In common with other crab-eating macaques it turns to other sources of food—typically in the dry and early rainy tropical seasons—when the preferred fruits are unavailable. This alternate diet includes young leaves, insects, flowers, seeds, and bark; it is also known to eat small crabs, frogs and other creatures taken from the shorelines and mangroves when foraging in these environments. Macaque populations which live in areas close to human settlements and farms frequently raid the croplands for food, and have even entered dwellings in search of sustenance if not actively discouraged by human presence.

Like all primates, it is a social animal, and spends a good deal of time interacting and grooming with other group members. It typically forages for food in the morning, resting in groups during the midday hours and then a subsequent period of foraging in the early evening before returning to designated roosting trees to sleep for the night.

It moves quadrupedally on the ground as well as in the canopy, and it is capable of leaping distances of up to 5 metres (16 ft) from tree to tree. Like other long-tailed macaques, it is also a proficient swimmer and may use this ability when threatened to avoid arboreal or terrestrial predators.

== Conservation status ==
Their conservation status as documented by the IUCN Red List is listed as vulnerable, having been amended in 2004 from the taxon's previous status as data deficient following some more extensive studies. This reflects the likely increase in disturbances to their habitat caused by human activities, in particular on the island of Katchal. The Wildlife Institute of India however registered their status in 2002 as critically endangered, reflecting also their concerns that conservation efforts with regards to a defined captive breeding programme were deficient.
