= INS Baaz =

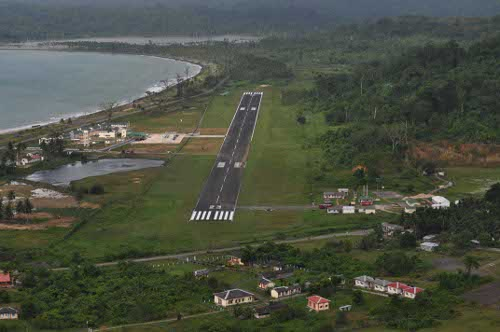
- Bird's eye view of INS Baaz
- IATA: none; ICAO: VOBX

Summary
- Airport type: Naval Air Station
- Operator: Indian Navy
- Location: Campbell Bay, Andaman & Nicobar Islands, India
- Coordinates: 7°0′47″N 93°55′25″E

Map
- Location within Andaman and Nicobar Islands Location within India

Runways
Direction	Length		Surface
Direction	m	ft	Surface
	1,310	4,300	Asphalt

INS Baaz is an Indian naval air station under the joint-services Andaman and Nicobar Command (ANC) of the Indian Armed Forces. It is located near Campbell Bay, on Great Nicobar island in the Andaman and Nicobar Islands. It is the southernmost air station of the Indian Armed Forces. It overlooks the Strait of Malacca as well as the Six Degree channel between Great Nicobar and the Indonesian island of Sumatra.

== History ==
INS Baaz was commissioned by the then-Chief of the Naval Staff, Admiral Nirmal Kumar Verma on 31 July 2012. It is the first air station in the Nicobar Islands, situated on the Great Nicobar Island in the remotest and southernmost part of the Andaman and Nicobar Islands and lies very close to the Six Degree channel, a vital choke point. The commissioning of the air station will facilitate positioning of maritime reconnaissance aircraft and helicopters of the Andaman and Nicobar Command (ANC) and also facilitate the civil administration to operate regular intra-island sorties. The Indian Navy's air station will provide requisite logistic, communication and administrative support for various aircraft undertaking surveillance, patrolling missions and maritime air operations. The strategically located INS Baaz will enable India to extend its reach in the eastern Indian Ocean region.

Commander SK Singh Deo is the first commanding officer of INS Baaz. INS Baaz will initially be used as a base for the Indian Navy's Dornier 228 reconnaissance aircraft. It can also operate the Indian Air Force's C-130J Super Hercules transport aircraft. Its runway measures 3,500 feet (1,100 m) and will be progressively lengthened to enable all heavy aircraft to operate from the base.

== Modernization ==
There were plans to extend the runway to 6,000 feet by 2016 and then to 10,000 feet. The Indian Navy has been flying new Boeing P-8I Poseidon surveillance aircraft with anti-submarine capabilities from mainland India to Port Blair. However, once the runway reaches, 6,000 feet they will likely rotate through Campbell Bay occasionally.

The expansion proposal was shelved after the Great Nicobar International Airport at Chingen was cleared. The runway extension was deemed as "impractical" due to the region's topography, navigation and infrastructure-related constraints.

== Airlines and destinations ==
Airlines	Destinations
Indian Air Force	Car Nicobar, Port Blair

== See also ==
Indian navy

- Andaman and Nicobar Command
- Eastern Command
  - INS Satavahana, at Visakhapatnam in Andhra Pradesh
- Western Command
  - INS Kadamba, at Karawar in Karnataka
  - INS Jatayu, at Minicoy in Lakshadweep
- List of Indian Navy bases
- List of active Indian Navy ships

Integrated commands and units

- Armed Forces Special Operations Division
- Defence Cyber Agency
- Integrated Defence Staff
- Integrated Space Cell
- Indian Nuclear Command Authority
- Indian Armed Forces
- Special Forces of India

Other lists

- Strategic Forces Command
- List of Indian Air Force stations
- List of Indian Navy bases
- India's overseas military bases
