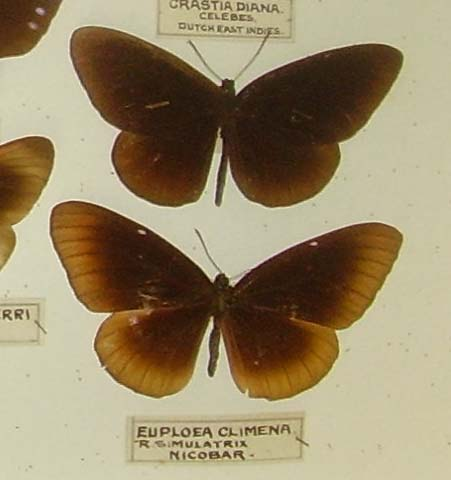
- Specimens originally labelled as E. climena simulatrix

Conservation status
- Vulnerable (IUCN 2.3)

Scientific classification
- Kingdom: Animalia
- Phylum: Arthropoda
- Clade: Pancrustacea
- Class: Insecta
- Order: Lepidoptera
- Family: Nymphalidae
- Genus: Euploea
- Species: E. scherzeri

Binomial name
- Euploea scherzeri (Felder, 1862)

Synonyms
- Euploea climena simulatrix (Wood-Mason & de Nicéville, 1881)

= Nicobar crow =

Species of butterfly

The Nicobar crow (Euploea scherzeri) is a species of nymphalid butterfly in the Danainae subfamily. It is endemic to the Nicobar Islands of India.

== Description ==
The following description is from Bingham (1907) and represents only the forms described under Euploea climena simulatrix. Male and female: Shape of wings more or less as in E. modesta, dorsum straighter near tornus in male. Upperside dark brown, the margins broadly paler; Female altogether paler than the male; forewing and hindwing in male uniform unspotted, in female with a small pinkish-white costal spot. Underside: ground colour similar; forewing: a spot at apex of discoidal cell, a small costal spot, and three discal spots bluish white. Hindwing: a bluish-white spot at apex of discoidal cell with five or six discal spots beyond. Antennae, head, thorax and abdomen very dark brown, almost black head, thorax and abdomen spotted with white.
