= International Container Transshipment Port, Galathea Bay =

Proposed port in Galathea Bay, India

The International Container Transshipment Port (ICTP), also called the Galathea Bay Port is a proposed container transshipment port as part of larger Great Nicobar Island Development Project at Galathea Bay, Great Nicobar Island in the union territory of Andaman and Nicobar Islands, India, to be constructed at a cost of ₹44,000 crore. It has a natural depth of more than 20 meter. It is developed by the Ministry of Ports, Shipping and Waterways under the Government of India. In September 2024, it was officially notified as the 13th major port of India. The first phase of development is expected to be commissioned in 2028.

== Etymology ==
Galathea Bay Port is named after the Danish colonial vessel Galathea which conducted survey for minerals in Great Nicobar in 1845-47.

== Background ==
Experts have long maintained that there is a compelling economic case for establishing a transshipment hub in India that can draw regional and domestic transhipment traffic away from the existing hubs, save significant revenue loss, improve logistics for Indian trade, lower risks to the nation's export competitiveness, and give India the chance to grow into a significant hub for transhipment of container traffic between Asia and Africa and Asia and the US and Europe. Currently, ports outside of India handle roughly 75% of the transhipped cargo from India. More than 85% of this cargo is handled at Colombo, Singapore, and Klang, with 45% of it handled at the Colombo Port. Although the under construction Vizhinjam Port is also a transshipment port, it is expected to mainly handle the cargo movement of the western side of India. The construction of Galathea Bay Port at the eastern side of the country is further expected to provide additional benefits such as currency savings, foreign direct investment, higher economic activity at other Indian ports, improved logistical infrastructure and hence efficiencies, job creation, and increased revenue share.

== Port development ==
The proposed port is expected to cost ₹41,000 crore and will be developed in total across four phases. Phase 1 is scheduled to begin operation in 2028 with a handling capacity of approximately 4 million TEUs, rising to 16 million TEUs in the final phase of development. The construction of breakwaters, dredging, reclamation, berths, storage areas, buildings, utilities, equipment procurement and installation, and the development of a port colony with core infrastructure are all included in the estimated cost of Phase 1 of the project, which is approximately ₹18,000 crore.

== Characteristics ==
The project is considered important because to its strategic closeness (40 nautical miles from the Malacca Strait) to the International trade route and the presence of transhipment facilities in Singapore, Klang, and Colombo. Additionally, the availability of naturally occurring water depths of more than 20 metres and the potential to handle transhipment goods from all the nearby ports, including domestic ones, are expected to make India a significant hub for Asia-African and Asia-US/European container traffic trade.

The phase one of the project includes two breakwaters, a 400-meter wide channel for navigation, an 800-meter turning circle, a total of seven berths at a length of around 2.3 km, a container yard with 125 ha, equipment for handling containers, including RMQCs and RTGs, and the option to build two berths for liquid cargo.

== Finance and administration ==
The Indian government intends to build the port under the landlord model, in which the publicly run port authority serves as both a landlord and a regulatory body, and private enterprises handle port operations, mostly cargo-handling tasks. The port will continue to be owned by the government, but private companies will be leased the infrastructure so they can maintain their own superstructures and set up their own cargo handling equipment. The landlord is compensated with a portion of the money made by the private company.

== Transport ==
ICTP is approximately 45 southwest of Campbell Bay and INS Baaz Naval Airport, reachable via the Campbell Bay-Galathea Bay Road (CB-GB Road) and Galathia Bridge 46 BRTF (BRO's Border Roads Task Force's bridge number 46) built by BRO.

== Environmental impact ==
The project may further endanger the already critically endangered leatherback turtles, one of the largest turtles on earth. The turtles nest annually at Galathea Bay, where the port is to be constructed.

== Present status ==
- 2025 Sept: necessary government approvals, formation of SPV financial entity for PPP funding, and granting of official status as among India's major 13 ports have been achieved. The project is advancing in the pre-construction phase as the land acquisition has begun but the tender for construction are yet to be awarded.

== See also ==
- Great Nicobar Island Development Project
- Transport in India
- List of ports in India
  - Sagar Mala project
  - Vizhinjam International Seaport Thiruvananthapuram
  - International Container Transshipment Terminal, Kochi
  - Ports in Andaman Nicobar Islands
    - Campbell Bay Port
    - Port Blair Port
