= Society for Andaman and Nicobar Ecology =

Environmental organization

The Society for Andaman and Nicobar Ecology, also known as SANE, is an environmental organization based in the city of Port Blair, in the Andaman and Nicobar Islands, India. It was formed for the preservation of the Andaman ecosystem.

== Involvement ==
Due to increasingly more contact of Jarawa adivasis of the Andaman Islands, since 1996, previously who were known for their fiercely isolationist behaviour, started to emerge from the forest area and made contact with the non-tribal population of the andaman. Due to completion of the National Highway 223 running throughout the andaman from north to south. The organization filed a suit in Calcutta High Court, under which andamanas jurisdiction comes. The case escalated to the Supreme Court of India as a Public Interest Litigation (or PIL).

SANE joined the Bombay Natural History Society and Pune-bare Kalpavriksh in this petition, which resulted in the High Court passing a judgment in 2001, directing the administration to take steps to protect the Jarawa from encroachment and contact, as well as preemptively ruling out any program that involved relocating the Jarawa to a new reservation. Planned extensions of the highway were also prohibited by the court. However the Andaman administration decided defying the order by keeping it open and continuing construction due to being the main and important highway and for its economical and social importance.

== See also ==
- Andamanese peoples
