= Mount Thullier =

Mount in the Nicobar Islands

- Mount Thuillier
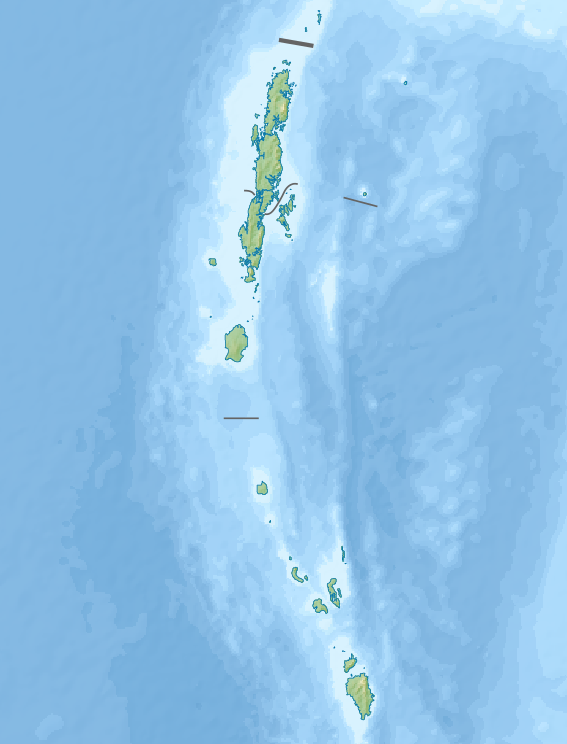
- Location within Andaman and Nicobar Islands

Highest point
- Elevation: 642 m (2,106 ft)
- Coordinates: 7°09′04″N 93°49′35″E

Geography
- Location: Great Nicobar Island, Nicobar Islands
- Country: India
- Union territory: Andaman and Nicobar Islands
- District: Nicobar district

Mount Thullier, also known as Mount Thuillier, is a mountain on Great Nicobar Island, located in the Indian Ocean and bordering on the Andaman Sea. At 642 m (2,106 ft) above sea level, it is the highest point on the island and in the Nicobar Islands.

== Etymology ==
Mount Thullier is likely named after British colonial officer Henry Edward Landor Thuillier who was Survey General of India from 1861 to 1878.

== Geology ==
The mountain is composed of parallel ridges of folded turbidite sandstone. The hill is thought to have arisen due to tectonic activity in the region.

== Topography ==
The island's five perennial rivers – Alexandra River (named after the Alexandra of Denmark who was wife of King Edward VII of the United Kingdom), Jubilee, Amrit Kaur River (named after the princess Amrit Kaur of princely state of Kapurthala who was first and longest serving health minister of India), Dogmar River, and Galathea River (named after the Danish colonial vessel Galathea which conducted survey for minerals in Great Nicobar in 1845-47) – all originate from Mount Thullier. The Galathea River is the longest, flowing southwards for about 30 km to empty into the sea at Galathea Bay near the southern tip of the island.

== See also ==
- Geography of Nicobar Islands
- List of mountains in India
