= Chingen =

Chingen Chiengen
- village
- Location in Andaman and Nicobar Islands, India Chingen (India)
- Coordinates: 6.8297667°N 93.8875654°E
- Country: India
- State: Andaman and Nicobar Islands
- District: Nicobar
- Tehsil: Great Nicobar
- Elevation: 19 m (62 ft)

Population (2011)
  - Total: 12
- Time zone: UTC+5:30 (IST)
- 2011 census code: 645189

Chingen is a village in the Nicobar district of Andaman and Nicobar Islands, India. It is located in the Great Nicobar tehsil.

== Demographics ==
The village, inhabited by several Shompen people was severely affected by the 2004 Indian Ocean earthquake and tsunami. According to the 2011 census of India, only 3 households had been left in Chingen (including FC at Magar Nalla). The effective literacy rate (i.e. the literacy rate of population excluding children aged 6 and below) is 25%.

Demographics (2011 Census)
	Total	Male	Female
Population	12	6	6
Children aged below 6 years	4	2	2
Scheduled caste	0	0	0
Scheduled tribe	12	6	6
Literates	2	2	0
Workers (all)	0	0	0
Main workers (total)	0	0	0
Main workers: Cultivators	0	0	0
Main workers: Agricultural labourers	0	0	0
Main workers: Household industry workers	0	0	0
Main workers: Other	0	0	0
Marginal workers (total)	0	0	0
Marginal workers: Cultivators	0	0	0
Marginal workers: Agricultural labourers	0	0	0
Marginal workers: Household industry workers	0	0	0
Marginal workers: Others	0	0	0
Non-workers	12	6	6
