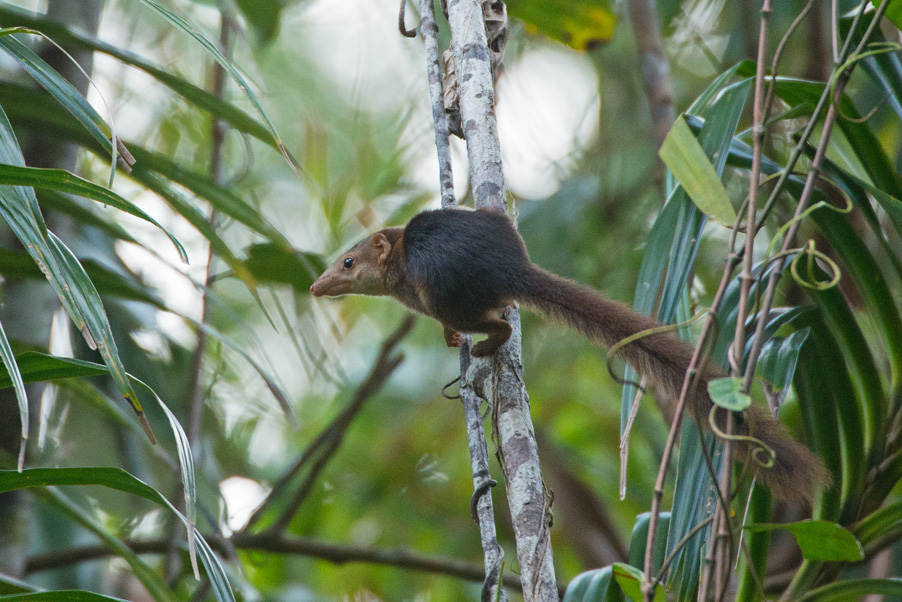

Conservation status
- Endangered (IUCN 3.1)
- CITES Appendix II

Scientific classification
- Kingdom: Animalia
- Phylum: Chordata
- Class: Mammalia
- Order: Scandentia
- Family: Tupaiidae
- Genus: Tupaia
- Species: T. nicobarica

Binomial name
- Tupaia nicobarica (Zelebor, 1868)
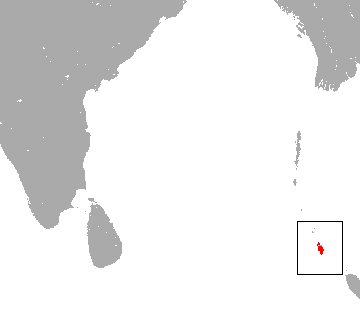
- Nicobar treeshrew range

= Nicobar treeshrew =

Species of mammal

The Nicobar treeshrew (Tupaia nicobarica) is a species of small, non-volant mammal. It is endemic to the Nicobar Islands of the Andaman Sea, India. where it inhabits the islands' rain forests. Based on geographical distribution, there are two subspecies identified: T. nicobarica nicobarica from the Great Nicobar Island and T. nicobarica surda from the Little Nicobar Island.

It is threatened by habitat loss, anthropogenic activities, forest fragmentation, tsunami events, and predation by other animals. and is classified as an Endangered species in the IUCN Red List of Threatened Species. Despite the listing, it is commonly found in its appropriate habitats.

The Nicobar treeshrew was first described by Johann Zelebor in 1868.

== Habitat ==
The Nicobar treeshrew only occupies the Indian Islands of Great Nicobar and Little Nicobar and can be found on the highest points of these two islands, 640 m (2,100 ft) above sea level. It lives in different forest types such as scrub jungle, moist deciduous forests, and montane sholas.

== Description ==
Morphologically, the Nicobar treeshrew resembles the squirrel and the mongoose, with an elongated snout, hairless and moist nasal pad, and lack of whiskers on their cheeks.

It possesses distinct craniomandibular and body characteristics that differentiate it from other South Asian treeshrews. Its lambdoid–premaxillary length averages 53.7 ± 0.79 mm (range 52.4–54.9 mm), while the mandibular condylo–incisive length measures 39.7 ± 0.46 mm (range 39.1–40.3 mm). The orbit to interorbital breadth is 0.90 ± 0.09 mm (range 0.80–1.09 mm), with the orbits slightly curved in structure. The mandibular coronoid breadth is notably large (3.47 ± 0.26 mm, range 3.02–3.85 mm), demonstrating the species' robust jaw morphology. Body measurements show relatively long head–body lengths of 193.3 ± 12.99 mm (range 180–224 mm) and tail lengths of 226.1 ± 10.02 mm (range 210.5–240 mm). The species displays a dorsal bicolor pelage and an average body weight of about 170 g, which helps with its identification as a comparatively large treeshrew among other treeshrews species.

== Phylogeny ==
Phylogenetic analyses indicate that T. nicobarica diverged from a common ancestor of the Tupaiidae lineage approximately 12–19 million years ago, during the Miocene. This suggests a long period of isolation in the Nicobar Islands. Further genetic studies based on 16S rRNA genes (1667 bp) showed significant genetic variability between T. nicobarica and other Tupaia species, which supports the fact that it is endemic to the Nicobar islands. It also demonstrated that T. nicobarica is related to T. minor, T. tana, T. splendidula, and T. montana, present in Thailand, Peninsular and East Malaysia, Brunei Darussalam, Sumatra, and Indonesia, including T. javanica, located in Sumatra and Java islands, as a sister specie to T. nicobarica.

== Ecology and behavior ==
The Nicobar treeshrew lives primarily in trees and ground, but it can also exhibit scansorial habits, which demonstrates diversity in its behavior. The Nicobar treeshrew is insectivorous and frugivorous, feeding mainly on insects and fruits. It also contributes to seed dispersal in tropical forests, playing an important ecological role in renewal of forest ecosystems. T. nicobarica has a small social structure. It is most often observed as solitary individuals or breeding pairs that forage and rest together. In its natural habitat, the species is known to be preyed upon by sparrowhawks (Accipiter spp.).
