= Campbell Bay, Great Nicobar =

Campbell Bay
- village
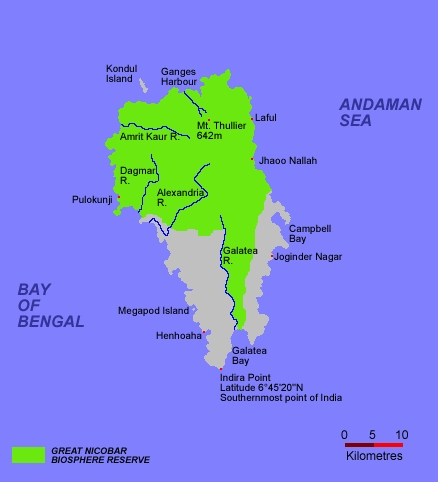
- Campbell Bay is located in the eastern part of the Great Nicobar Island

- Location in India Campbell Bay (India) Campbell Bay (Bay of Bengal)
- Coordinates: 7.007565°N 93.9047849°E
- Country: India
- State: Andaman and Nicobar Islands
- District: Nicobar
- Tehsil: Great Nicobar
- Elevation: 76 m (249 ft)

Population (2011)
  - Total: 5,736
- Time zone: UTC+5:30 (IST)
- 2011 census code: 645200

Campbell Bay is a village in the Nicobar district of Andaman and Nicobar Islands, India. It is located in the Great Nicobar tehsil. The island's Indira Point is famous for being the southernmost point of India.

== Demographics ==
According to the 2011 census of India, Campbell Bay has 1608 households. The effective literacy rate (i.e. the literacy rate of population excluding children aged 6 and below) is 86.28%.

Demographics (2011 Census)
	Total	Male	Female
Population	5736	3362	2374
Children aged below 6 years	692	369	323
Scheduled caste	0	0	0
Scheduled tribe	453	256	197
Literates	4352	2708	1644
Workers (all)	2707	2224	483
Main workers (total)	2417	2037	380
Main workers: Cultivators	38	28	10
Main workers: Agricultural labourers	21	21	0
Main workers: Household industry workers	7	5	2
Main workers: Other	2351	1983	368
Marginal workers (total)	290	187	103
Marginal workers: Cultivators	24	15	9
Marginal workers: Agricultural labourers	34	25	9
Marginal workers: Household industry workers	7	1	6
Marginal workers: Others	225	146	79
Non-workers	3029	1138	1891

== National park ==
Campbell Bay National Park is a part of Great Nicobar Biosphere Reserve. This national park is spread over 426 km^{2} in the northern part of Great Nicobar. The park reserve's flora includes tropical evergreen forest, tree fern, and orchids and fauna includes Crab-eating macaque, giant robber crab, megapode, and Nicobar pigeon. This comes along the basin side of Glatiya river. The capital of these islands is Port Blair, these Islands were named Swaraj Shahid Island by Netaji Subash Chandra bose.

== INS Baaz ==
INS Baaz was inaugurated on 31 July 2012 by Admiral Nirmal Verma of Indian Navy. INS Baaz is a full-fledged "forward operating base" of the Indian Naval Air Arm at the very southernmost tip of the Andaman Nicobar Islands. The Naval Air Station (NAS) Campbell Bay overlooking the six degree Channel, one of the most crucial shipping lanes of the world, will soon become India's eye over the Malacca strait and the Bay of Bengal.

== See also ==
- International Container Transshipment Terminal, Great Nicobar Island
- Port Blair Port
