= Great Nicobar Island =

Indian island in the Bay of Bengal

Great Nicobar
Native name: Tokieong Long
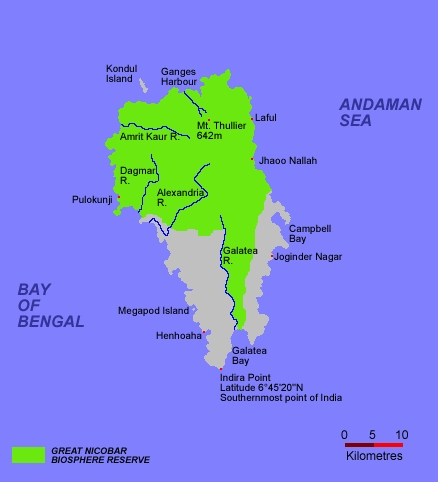
- Map of Great Nicobar Island

- Location of Great Nicobar Island in the Andaman and Nicobar Islands Great Nicobar Island (Bay of Bengal)

Geography
- Location: Bay of Bengal
- Coordinates: 7.03°N 93.8°E
- Archipelago: Nicobar Islands
- Adjacent to: Indian Ocean
- Total islands: 1
- Major islands: Great Nicobar
- Area: 921 km^{2} (356 sq mi)
- Coastline: 202 km (125.5 mi)
- Highest elevation: 642 m (2106 ft)
- Highest point: Mount Thullier

Administration
- India
- District: Nicobar
- Island group: Nicobar Islands
- Subdivisions of India: Great Nicobar Subdivision
- Taluk: Split between Little Nicobar and Campbell Bay Taluk
- Largest settlement: Campbell Bay (pop. 5,740)

Demographics
- Population: 8,067 (2014)
- Pop. density: 8.8/km^{2} (22.8/sq mi)
- Ethnic groups: Hindustani, Nicobarese, Shompen

Additional information
- Time zone: IST (UTC+5:30)
- PIN: 744301
- Area code: 03192
- ISO code: IN-AN-00
- Official website: andaman.nic.in
- Literacy: 84.4%
- Avg. summer temperature: 32.0 °C (89.6 °F)
- Avg. winter temperature: 28.0 °C (82.4 °F)
- Sex ratio: ♂/♀
- Census Code: 35.638.0002
- Official Languages: English; Shompen; Nicobarese; Tamil; Southern Nicobarese (regional)

Great Nicobar is the southernmost and largest of the Nicobar Islands of India, north of Sumatra. It is part of India, in the Nicobar district within the union territory of the Andaman and Nicobar Islands.

== History ==
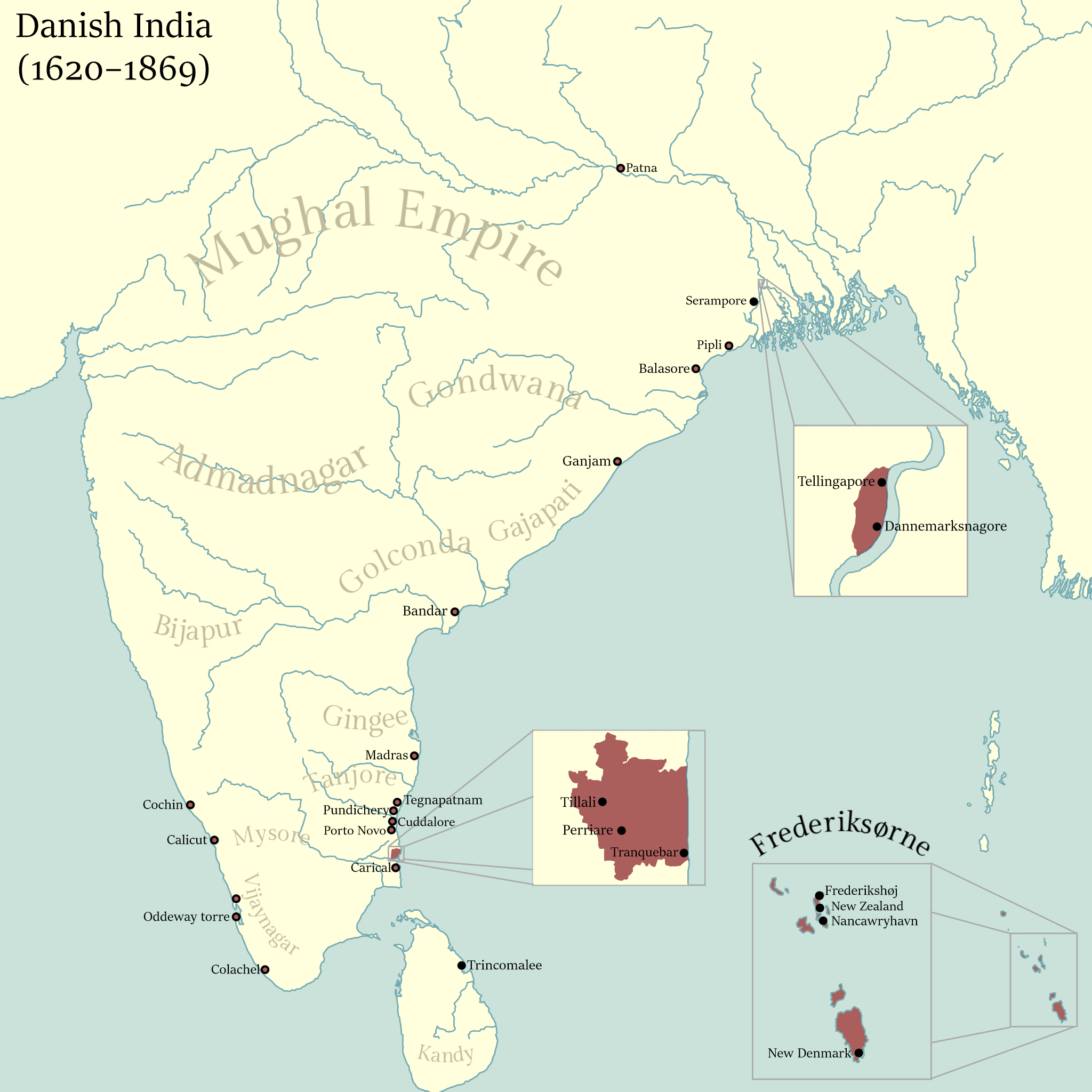
Map of Danish India

Nicobar Island has been well known to Indian mariners since the time of the seafaring Cholas.

In the 15th century, Great Nicobar Island was recorded as "Cui Lan island" (翠蘭嶼) during the voyages of Zheng He in the Mao Kun map of the Wu Bei Zhi.

The Nicobar Islands were claimed by Denmark in 1755; Great Nicobar Island was called New Denmark, and the whole of the Nicobars was called Frederikøerne. The islands were administered from the Tranquebar the headquarters of the Danish East Indian company, but were often abandoned due to Malaria outbreaks. The rights to the islands were sold to the British in 1868 along with the rest of the Danish holdings in India.

Great Nicobar Island was severely affected by the 2004 Indian Ocean earthquake tsunami with many deaths, and was cut off from all outside contact for over a day.

== Geography ==
Great Nicobar is located 180 km (110 mi) to the north of the island of Sumatra. The island covers 921 km^{2} (356 sq mi) but is sparsely inhabited, with a population of 8067. It is largely covered by rainforest and known for its diverse wildlife.

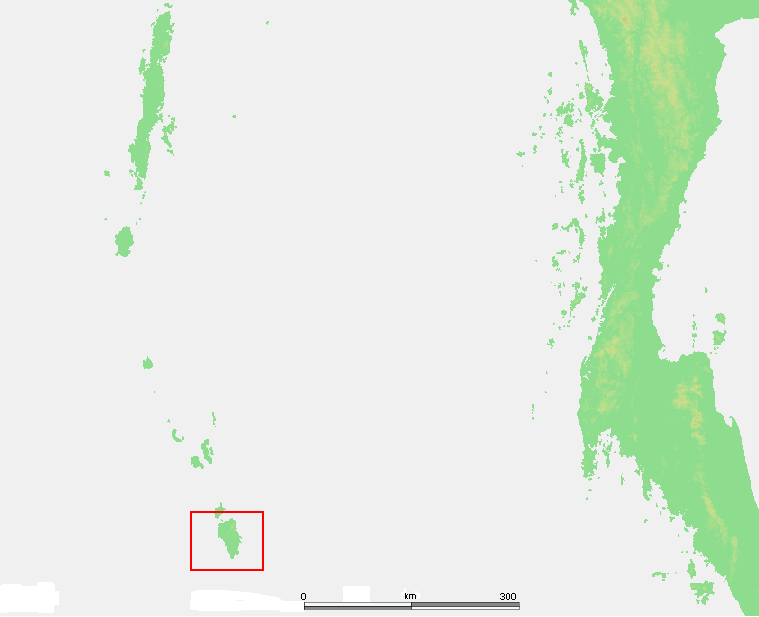
Locator

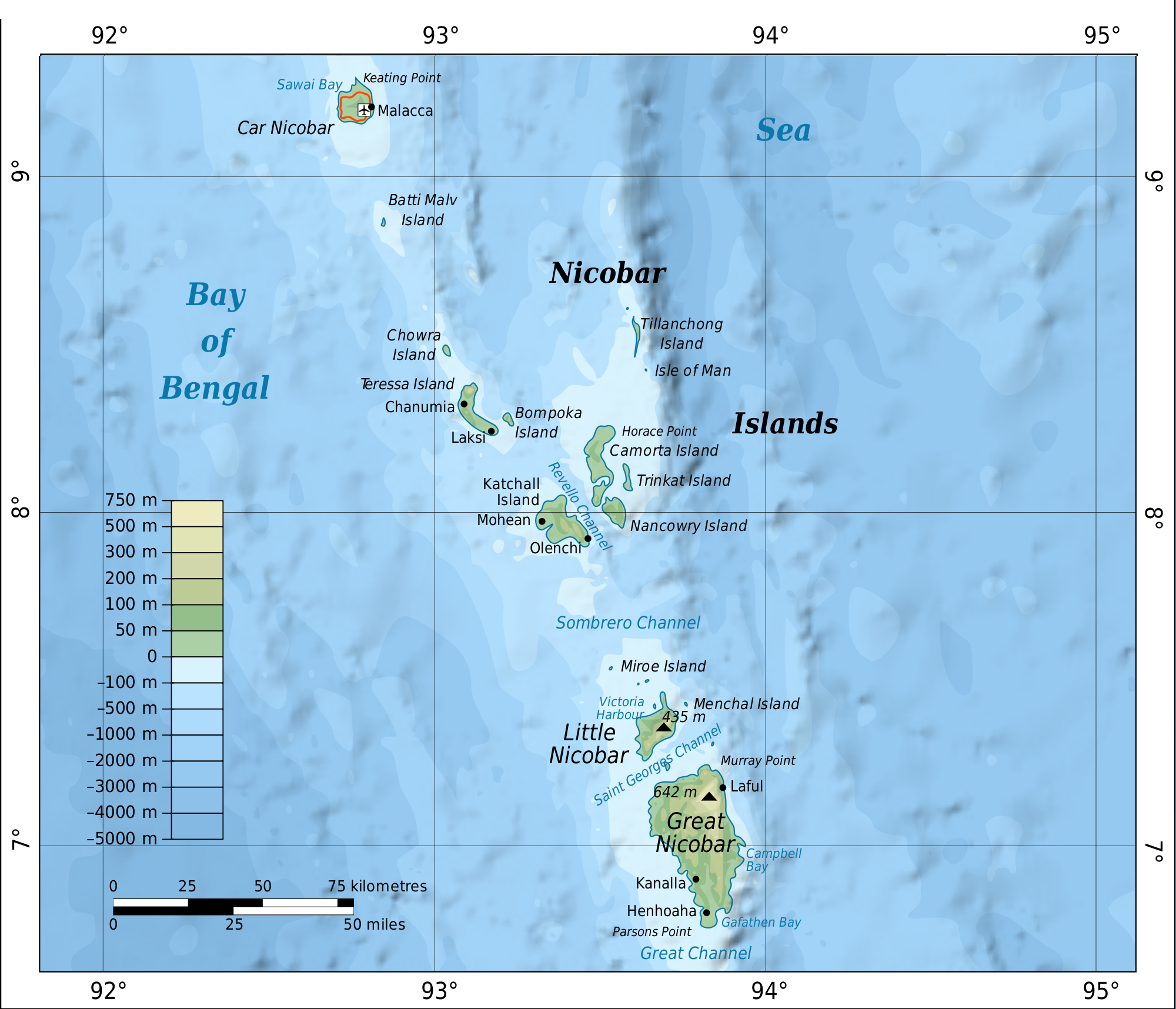
Map

=== Topography ===
The island has several rivers, including the Alexandra River (named after the Alexandra of Denmark who was wife of King Edward VII of the United Kingdom), Amrit Kaur River (named after the princess Amrit Kaur of princely state of Kapurthala who was the first and longest serving health minister of India), Dogmar River, and Galathea River (named after the Danish colonial vessel Galathea which conducted survey for minerals in Great Nicobar in 1845-47). Virtually all rivers flow in a southern or southwesterly direction, which is indicative of the general slope of the terrain across the island. There are undulating hills throughout the island, with the main range running in a north–south orientation. Mount Thullier (likely named after British colonial officer Henry Edward Landor Thuillier who was Survey General of India from 1861 to 1878), which is part of this range, has the highest elevation of any point in the Nicobars, at 642 m above sea level.

Indira Point (6°45′10″N and 93°49′36″E), named after Indira Gandhi, is the southernmost point of the Great Nicobar Island and India itself. Indira Point subsided 4.25 m in the 26 December 2004 tsunami and the lighthouse there was damaged. The lighthouse was subsequently made functional.

== Ecology ==
The island is part of the Nicobar Islands rain forests ecoregion. Plant communities include mangroves and coastal forests near the seashore, and evergreen and deciduous forests in the interior.

The majority of the island is designated as the Great Nicobar Biosphere Reserve. It is home to many unique and endemic species of plants and animals including the Nicobar scrubfowl (Megapodius nicobariensis, a megapode bird), the edible-nest swiftlet (Aerodramus fuciphagus), the Nicobar long-tailed macaque (Macaca fascicularis umbrosa), saltwater crocodile (Crocodylus porosus), giant leatherback sea turtle (Dermochelys coriacea), Malayan box turtle, Nicobar tree shrew, reticulated python (Python reticulatus) and the giant robber crab (or coconut crab, Birgus latro).

== Demographics ==
The island is home to the Shompen people.

== Transportation ==
- There is a 915 m airstrip at Campbell Bay/Tenlaa on the East coast.
- Seaport: At least one small shipping dock is located in Campbell Bay.
- International Container Transshipment Port, Galathea Bay is a proposed mega transshipment deep water port.
- A new airfield has been proposed to be constructed at Chingen, located on the southern part of the island. The project, worth ₹8,573 crore (US$890 million), has been undertaken by the Airports Authority of India as a civil-military dual-purpose Greenfield Airport. The DPR has been approved and commercial bidding is to follow by late 2025. It will be the second airport in the Great Nicobar Islands following INS Baaz. The project is part of the larger International Container Transshipment Port programme.

== Naval air station ==
The INS Baaz naval air station, near Campbell Bay, is under the joint-services Andaman and Nicobar Command (ANC) of the Indian Armed Forces. It is the southernmost air station of the Indian Armed Forces.

== Great Nicobar Development Plan ==
The Great Nicobar Development Plan is a massive infrastructure plan (including a major transshipment port, airport, and future strategic defence) for the southern tip of Great Nicobar Island, India. The plan has generated criticism over the consequences of deforestation and giant leatherback sea turtle nesting sites. The plan was proposed on 18 January 2021 by an Indian policy think tank (NITI Aayog) and informed by a feasibility report written by AECOM India Private Limited. Environmental justice groups have pushed back claiming that the development plan would make it unlikely that the leatherback sea turtles would continue to nest in the Galathea Bay and negatively impact the nomadic livelihoods of the indigenous Shompen people. Survival International, a global NGO campaigning for indigenous rights, has said that the mega-development will put the Shompen at risk of being wiped out. In February 2024, 39 genocide experts from 13 countries warned that the development “will be a death sentence for the Shompen, tantamount to the international crime of genocide”.

They said that the proposed population increase and exposure to outside populations would lead to mass deaths because the Shompen have little to no immunity to infectious outside diseases. The NITI Aayog plan envisages 650,000 people inhabiting the island by 2050. Its current population is only around 8,500. The total population of the archipelago, composed of over 500 islands of which only around 40 are inhabited, is around 380,000. The population increase is expected to impose a significant ecological pressure on the island and its surroundings.

== Indira Point ==
Indira Point is the name of the southernmost point of India. It is situated on Great Nicobar Island in the Nicobar Islands, which are located in the eastern Indian Ocean at 6°45’10″N and 93°49’36″E. This is not on the Indian mainland, but within the Union Territory of Andaman and Nicobar Islands. The name of the point was changed from Pygmalion Point on 18 October 1985 in commemoration of Indira Gandhi. It was formerly known by various names that include Pygmalion Point, Parsons Point, and for a brief period India Point.

It is located 540 km and more than a day's sea voyage from Port Blair, the capital city and main port of the Andaman and Nicobar Islands. It is approximately 163 km by sea from Sumatra, Indonesia. Rondo Island, Indonesia's northernmost island in Sabang district of Aceh province of Sumatra, lies south of Indira point. India and Indonesia are planning to collaborate to construct a port at Sabang to protect the channel between Great Nicobar Island and Rondo Island (c. May 2019).

=== Indira Point lighthouse ===
Indira Point has a 35 m high cast iron (with red and white bands) lighthouse with 16 nautical miles range. The lighthouse has (RACON (Code 'G') ii DGPS station) with a 300 mm 4 panel revolving light inside a 2.5 m diameter lantern house (BBT). It is an important landmark on the international shipping lane Colombo-Singapore route via Malacca Strait that passes south of Indira Point. It also has a helipad.

=== 2004 tsunami ===
The tsunami which resulted from the Indian Ocean earthquake of 2004 inundated much of the area. This partly damaged the lighthouse, which subsided 4.25 m. As a result of this subsidence, the coast retreated and the sea moved permanently inland. The lighthouse has since been repaired.

The base of the lighthouse was 5 m above sea level when constructed in 1972. After the tsunami, the sea floor fell and the base was less than 1 m above sea level. Since then, the subsidence has decreased somewhat as the ocean floor slowly rebounds, and the lighthouse base become more elevated. Indira point was mostly submerged.

== See also ==
- Andaman Sea
- Extreme points of Indonesia
- List of extreme points of India
