= Assassination of Richard Bourke, 6th Earl of Mayo =

1872 killing of the Governor-General of India

Ali and Bourke
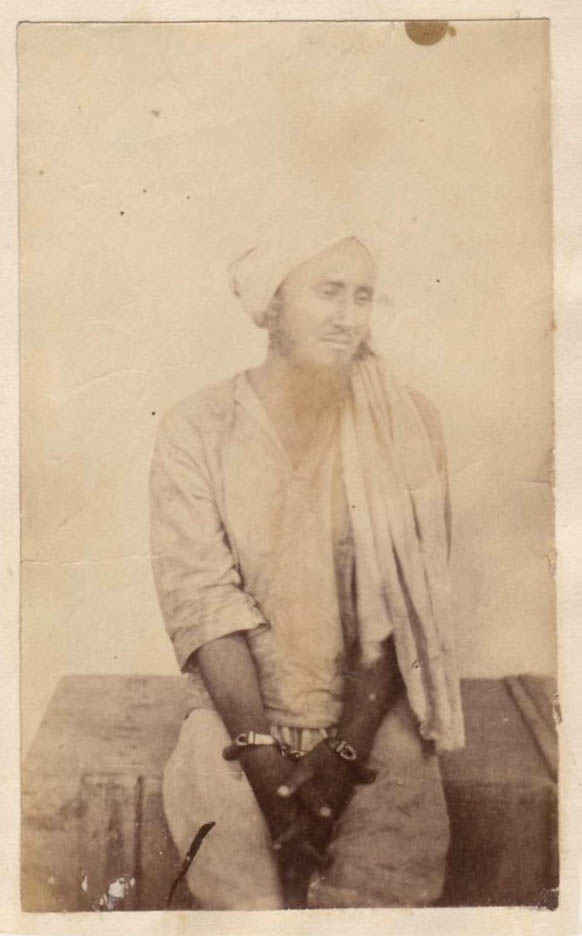
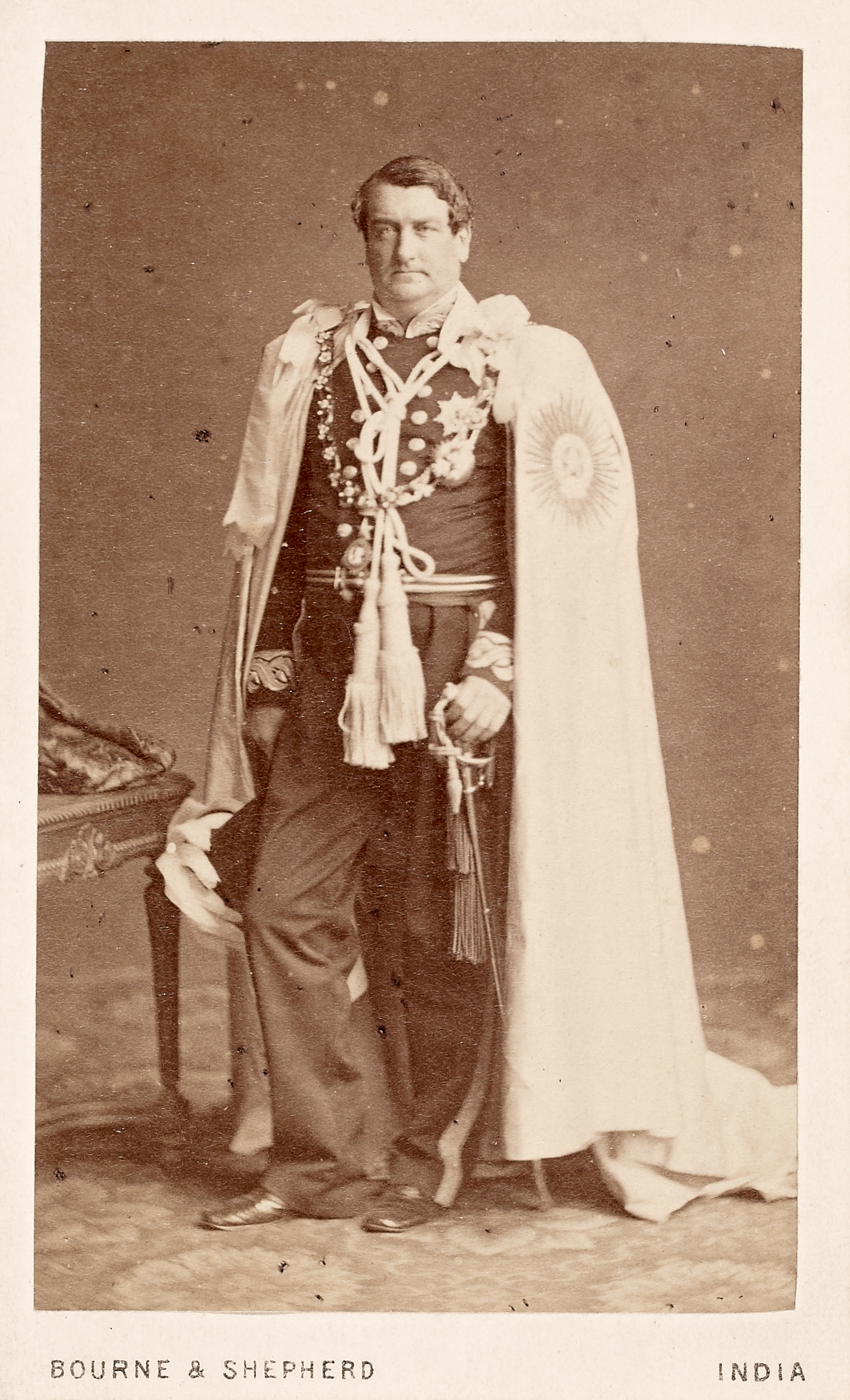

Richard Southwell Bourke, 6th Earl of Mayo, the Viceroy and Governor-General of India, was assassinated on 8 February 1872 by Sher Ali Afridi, an Indian soldier of Afghan Muslim background, who had been convicted of murder and condemned to penal servitude. The assassination occurred at the penal settlement of Port Blair, Andaman Islands, India. It was the first, and only, time a Governor-General of India was assassinated. (Note: Several attempts to assassinate a Governor-General of India have occurred throughout the history of British India. Louis Mountbatten, 1st Earl Mountbatten of Burma was assassinated in Ireland, after his term of Viceroy.)

== Assassination ==
=== Background ===
Lord Mayo, a Conservative statesman of Anglo-Irish background, entitled the Earl of Mayo in the peerage of Ireland, had served as Viceroy of India since January 1869. He had been appointed by Queen Victoria on the advice of the then Prime Minister, Benjamin Disraeli (later confirmed by William Ewart Gladstone). In late January 1872, he engaged in a State visit to Rangoon and Maulmain in Burma, where he was received with great splendour. On 30 January he held a levee and ball, and hosted a grand ball on 2 February. On 5 February he visited the Andaman Islands, where he planned to inspect the infamous Penal settlement at Port Blair. The islands were used as a British penal colony for convicts from India, both criminals and political prisoners. Arriving with a large entourage, Lord Mayo was involved in drafting the regulations of the penal settlement at Port Blair. He did not plan to stay longer than a single day and was mainly interested in prison reforms, improving the welfare of prisoners.

Sher Ali Afridi, also known as Sher Ali Khan, was an ethnic Pathan from the North-West Frontier, who had formerly served in the Peshawar police. He had been condemned to life imprisonment (more specifically penal servitude) for a murder he had committed in British territory of the North-West Frontier—a murder he claimed to be innocent of—and was thus sent to the Penal colony in the Andaman Islands. Indignant and claiming innocence, he elected to kill two Government officials, the Superintendent and the Viceroy, as revenge for his sentence, which he thought more severe than he deserved. Sher Ali waited for a full day to commit the assassination; it was not until the evening that he found an opportunity to kill the Viceroy. He said that he killed on the instructions of God. He readily posed for photographs.

British sources later described him thus:

All who met Shere Ali were struck with his appearance ... he was powerfully made, very active and a good horseman. He was as fair as a European, with light beard and moustache, and blue eyes... [he was] a fearless soldier and one who would have been selected for any service of danger. Like the rest of his tribe he was constantly involved in blood feuds..."

=== Attack ===
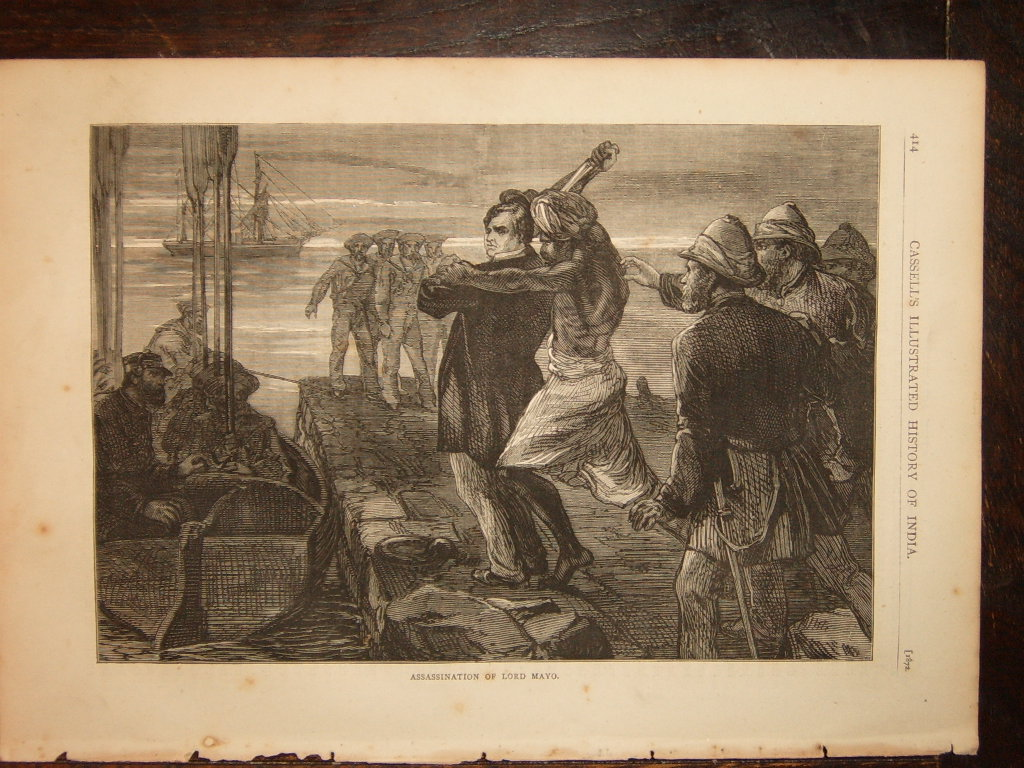
'The Assassination of Lord Mayo' from Cassel's Illustrated History of India (1880)

At 7:00 PM on 8 February, when the Viceroy had almost completed his inspection of the penal settlement at Port Blair and was returning to his boat, where Lady Mayo was also waiting, Sher Ali Afridi appeared from the dark and stabbed him in the neck, causing Mayo to bleed to death and die at the scene. Sher Ali was immediately arrested by twelve security personnel, whose gross failure to detect and defer the assassin was soon evident.

== Reactions ==
The murder of the Viceroy, appointed by the British Crown, sent shock waves throughout the British Empire. It was entirely unexpected and unexplained. Yet, in the context of the Indian Mutiny of 1857 and recent murder of John Paxton Norman in 1871, not entirely so. More locally concerned, the incident attracted much attention to the Andaman islands, which were relatively unheard of in the Western world.

It was initially assumed that the reasoning for the murder was purely Jihadist, ignoring Sher Ali's imprisonment; as a man serving a life imprisonment he had nothing to lose in assassinating Lord Mayo.

Queen Victoria was shocked by the assassination of her fourth Viceroy. The news was telegraphed directly to Windsor Castle four days after the event, with the Queen pasting the telegram into her journal.

== Aftermath ==
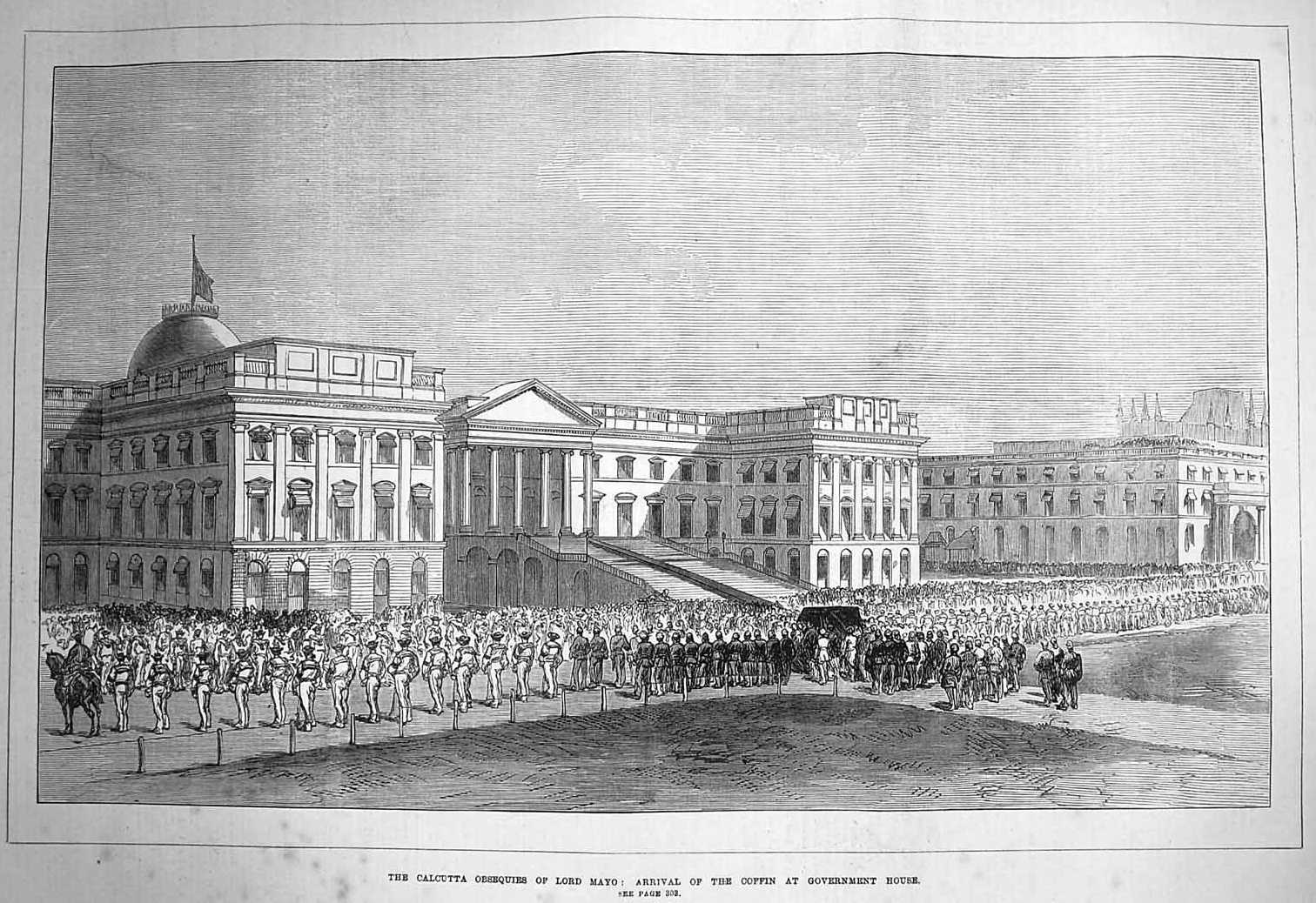
Lord Mayo's funeral in Calcutta

An inquiry into the assassination was launched.

Some jihadist-inspired prisoners were jailed at Andaman during the same period but the British found no link to the murder of the Viceroy and the presence of these prisoners.

Sher Ali Afridi was condemned to death and was hanged on the gallows of Viper Island prison, on 11 March 1872.

== See also ==
- Delhi conspiracy case
- Assassination of Louis Mountbatten, 1st Earl Mountbatten of Burma
