= Tourism in the Andaman and Nicobar Islands =

Tourism in Andaman and Nicobar Islands relates to tourism in union territory of India, Andaman and Nicobar Islands. The Andamans are an archipelago of over 572 tropical islands, of which only 38 are inhabited. In 2004 Radhanagar beach at Havelock Island was bestowed with the title of "Asia’s Best Beach" and as the world's seventh most spectacular beach by Time magazine.

Tourism is a major industry in Andaman. The bulk of the revenue earned by the government of Andaman and Nicobar is through the tourism industry. In 2019 around 525,000 tourists visited Andaman and Nicobar. Growing sectors in tourism and potential area of investment are water sports and adventure tourism including trekking, island camping, snorkeling and scuba diving. Sea aquarium, water theme park, wave surfing, marine yacht, convention centre, health resorts, sanctuaries, national park, inter-island cruise liner. New islands in the Andaman archipelago are expected to open for tourism related activities. Andaman and Nicobar Islands are promoted as an eco tourism destination. The major activities currently present in the islands are Scuba Diving, Sea Walking, Parasailing, Kayaking, Game Fishing, Semi submarine, Glass bottom boat ride and Night cruising. North Bay Island and Havelock Island are the two top islands that promotes adventure related tourism activities. Accommodation is available at all the major islands such as Port Blair, Havelock and Neil Island.

== Natural resources in Andaman ==
Andaman and Nicobar has approximately 86 percent of forest area of its total land. The forests constitute an integral wing of the natural resource of Andaman and Nicobar and it houses 96 sanctuaries and nine national parks.

The primary sanctuaries that form a part of the natural resources of Andaman and Nicobar islands are Narcondum Hornbill Sanctuary, which protects hornbills; Mahatma Gandhi Marine National Park, which features a large variety of aquatic creatures; Nicobar Pigeon Sanctuary; South Sentinel Island Sanctuary, offering giant robber crabs; and North Reef Sanctuary, which is principally dedicated to the nurturing of a variety of water birds.

== Tourism ==
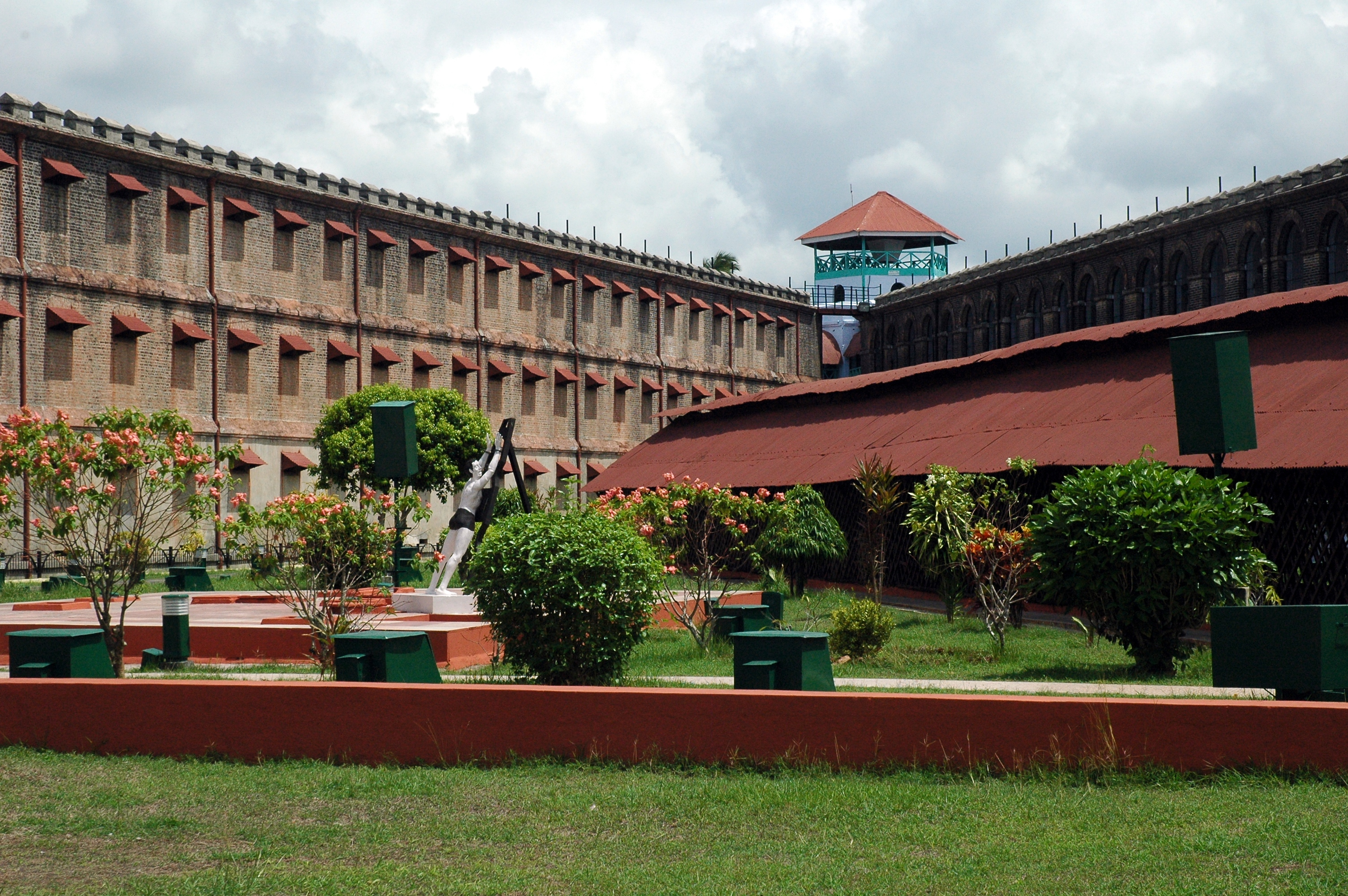
Cellular Jail

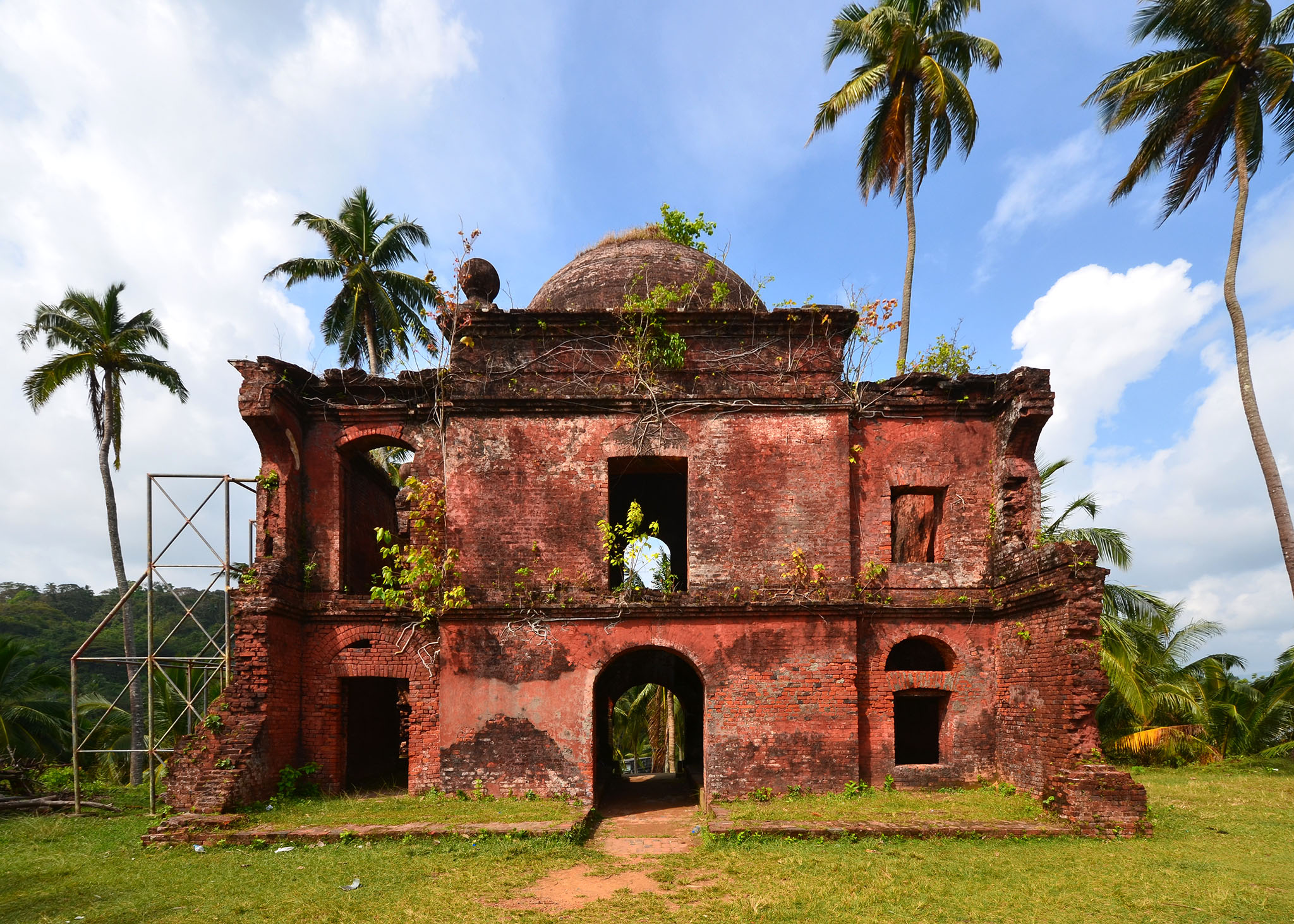
Historic gallows on Viper Island

Major tourist attractions in Andaman and Nicobar islands include:

=== Cellular Jail ===
The Cellular Jail, also known as Kālā Pānī (Black Water), was a colonial prison. The prison was used by the British especially to exile political prisoners to the remote archipelago. Many notable dissidents such as Batukeshwar Dutt and Vinayak Damodar Savarkar, among others, were imprisoned here during the struggle for India's independence. Today, the complex serves as a national memorial monument.

=== Swaraj Island (Havelock Island) ===
Swaraj Island (formerly known as Havelock Island), with an area of 113.93 km², is the largest of the islands that comprise Ritchie's Archipelago, a chain of islands to the east of Great Andaman in the Andaman Islands.

=== Radhanagar Beach ===
Radhanagar Beach is a beautiful pristine clean beach located on the western coast of Havelock Island. Called an infinite beach, Radhanagar was voted the best beach in Asia by Time Magazine in 2004 and is now considered one of the top 100 beaches in the world. Radhanagar beach was awarded the prestigious blue flag certification in the year 2020. The Blue Flag certification is a globally recognised eco-label accorded by "Foundation for Environment Education, Denmark" based on 33 stringent criteria under four major heads -- environmental education and information, bathing water quality, environment management and conservation, and safety and services at the beaches.

=== Netaji Subhash Chandra Bose Island ===
Netaji Subhash Chandra Bose Island was the seat of British administration. This is the island from where the British governed the entire Andaman Islands and had set up a colony on this island. It was previously called Ross Island. The Indian Navy currently manages the island and the island is open to tourist visits. A boat ride is required to reach Netaji Subhash Chandra Bose Island from the Rajiv Gandhi water sports complex. The island is closed to tourists on Wednesday.

=== Viper Island ===
Viper Island is near Port Blair, the capital of the Andaman and Nicobar Islands, was the site of the jail where the British used to imprison convicts and political prisoners. It has the ruins of a gallows atop a hillock. The jail was abandoned when the Cellular Jail was constructed in 1906.

=== Baratang Island ===
The Baratang Island which lies 100 kilometres north of Port Blair, also has a mangrove creeks leading to limestone caves and mud volcanoes.

== Gallery ==
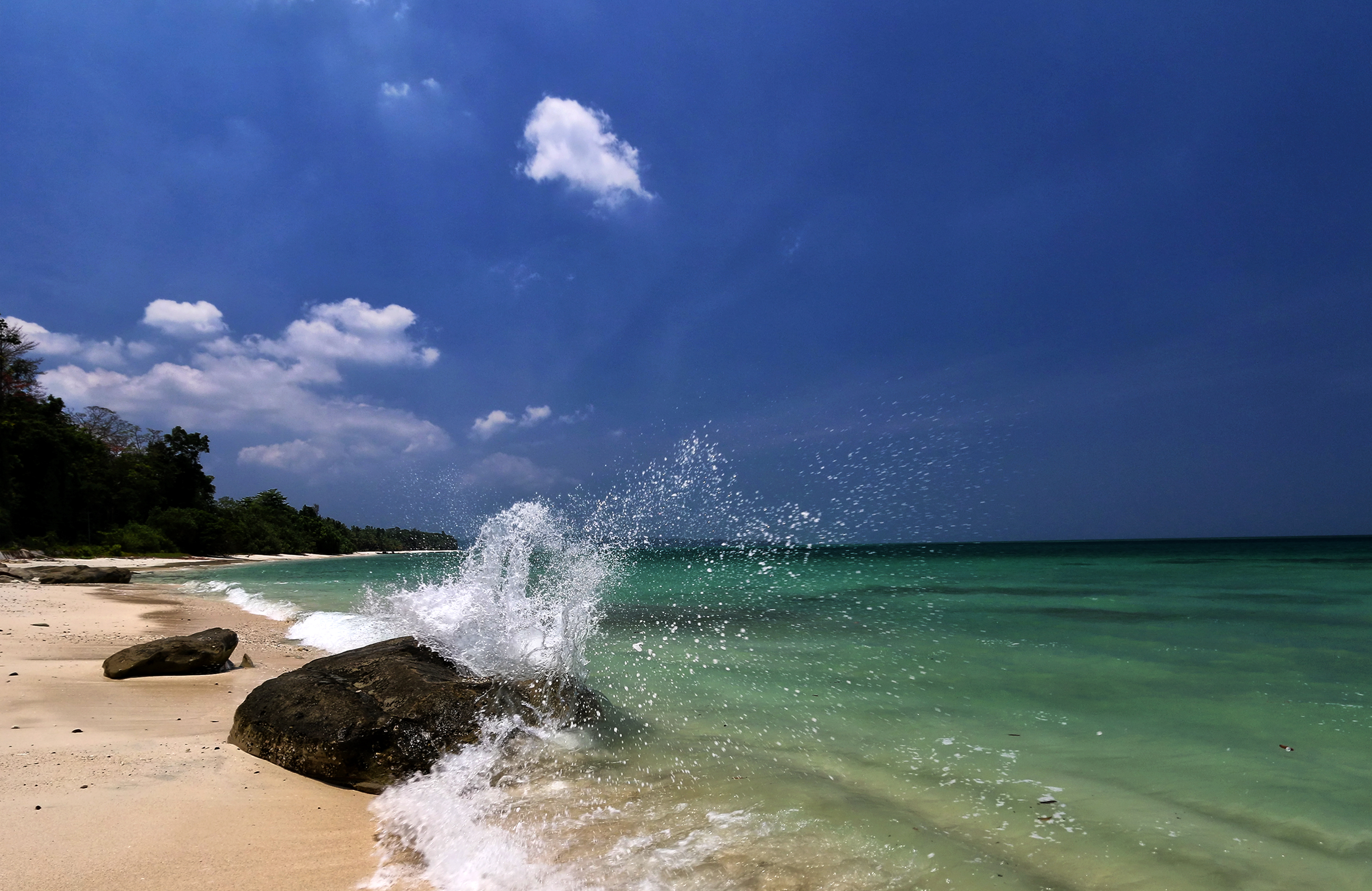
Havelock Island.

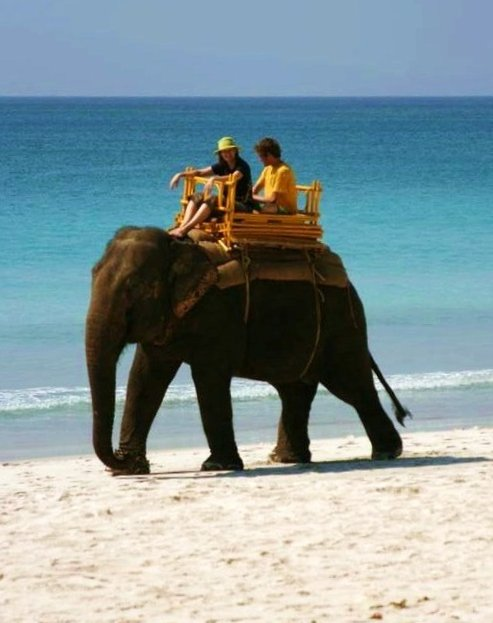
Elephant at Havelock

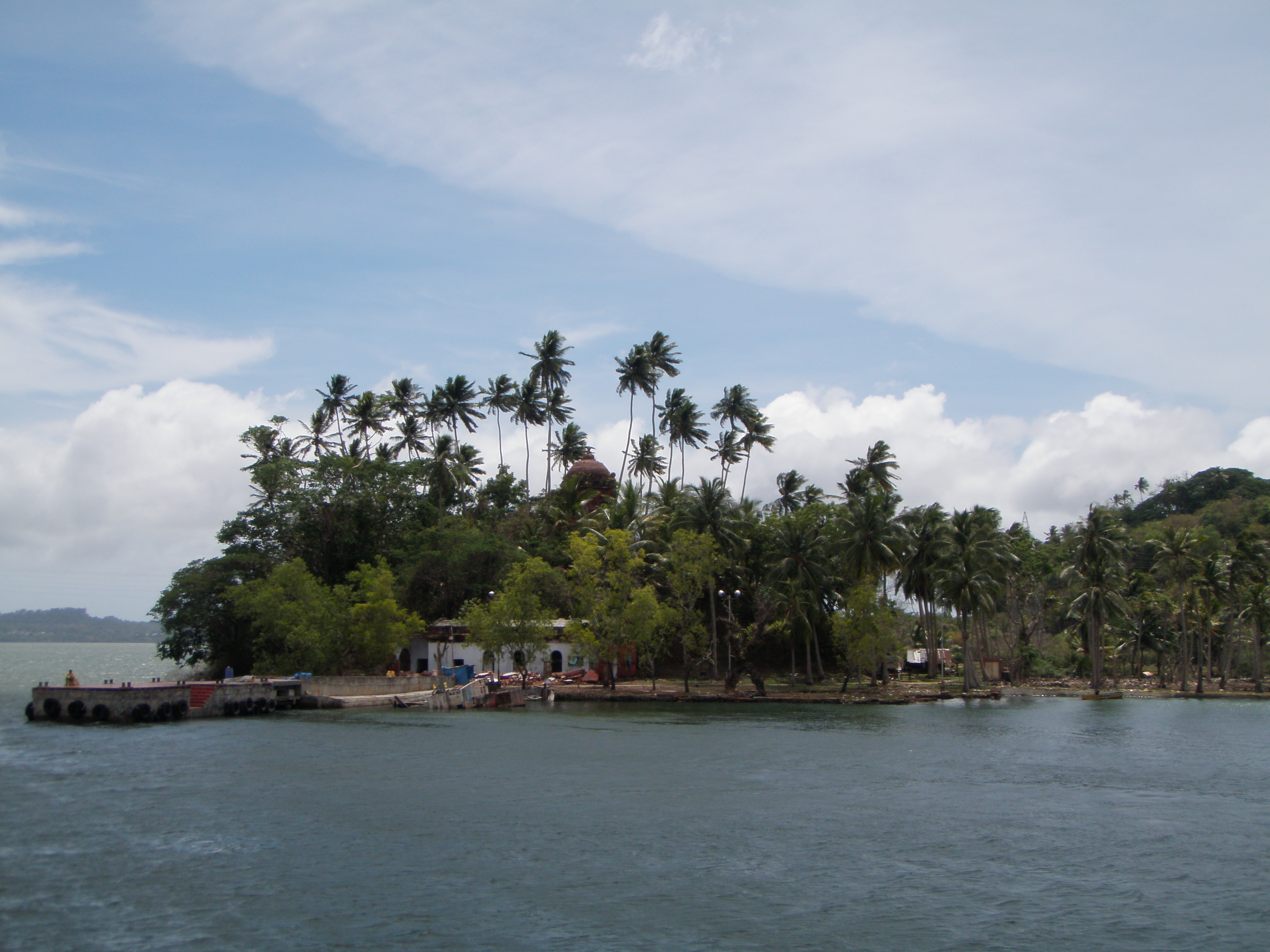
Viper Island

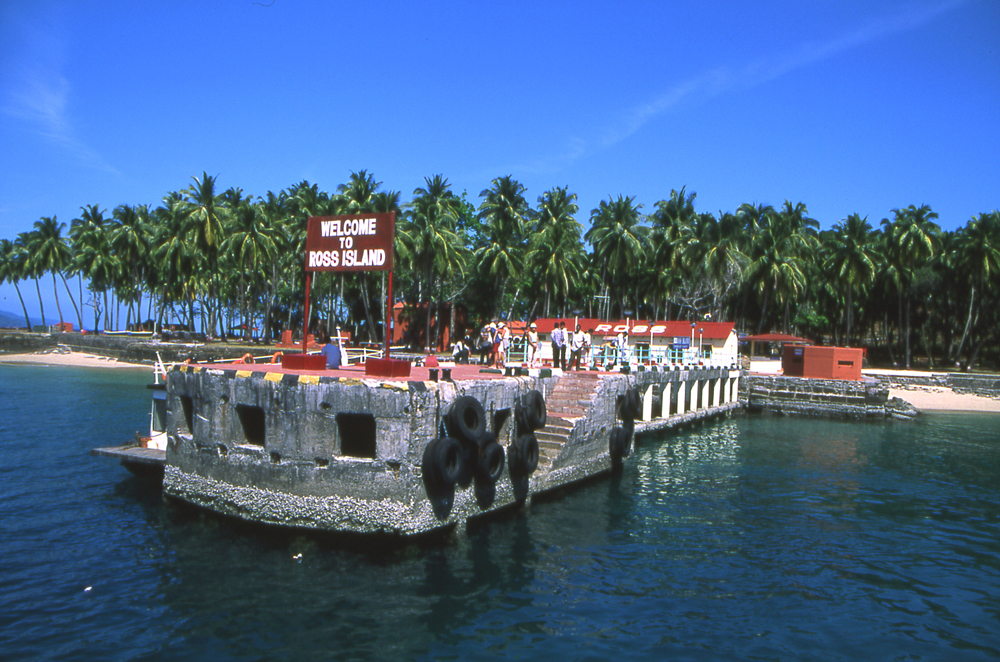
One view of Ross Island

== See also ==
- Tourism in India
- Outline of tourism in India
