= Sher Ali Afridi =

Assassin of the Viceroy of British India in 1872

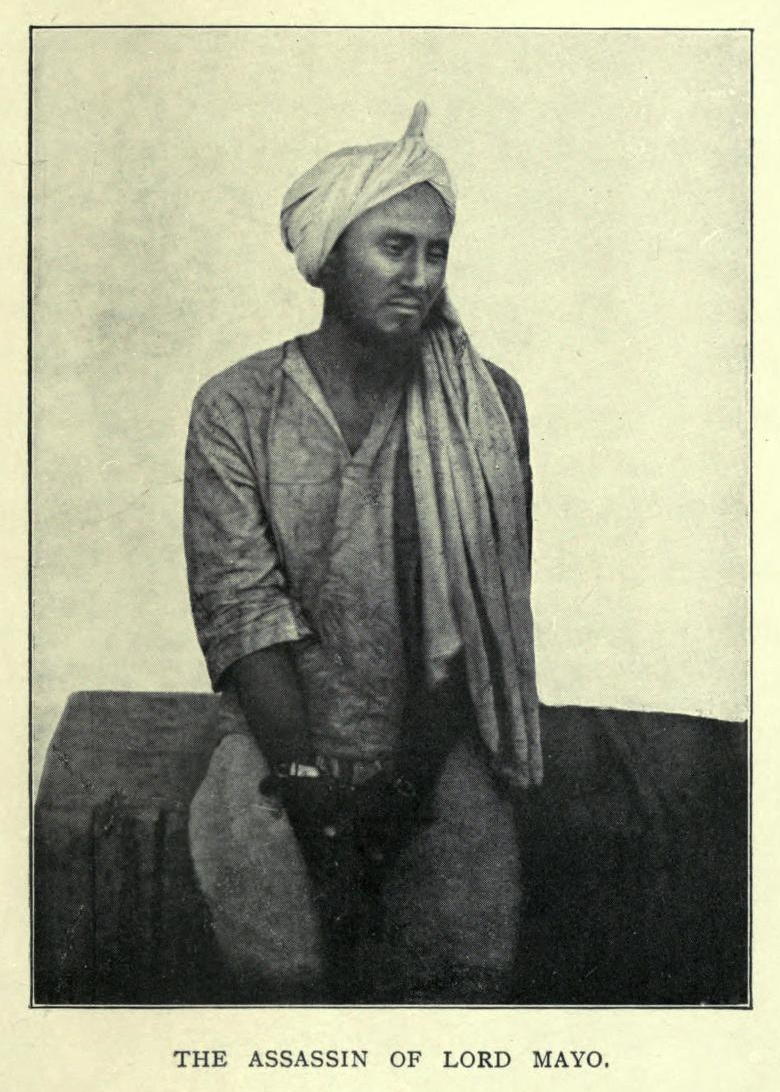
- Sher Ali Afridi, photograph taken after he killed Lord Mayo
- Born: Tirah, NWFP, British India
- Died: 11 March 1872; Viper Island, Andaman Islands, British India
- Cause of death: Execution by hanging
- Occupations: Cavalry trooper and policeman in Peshawar; Convicted criminal
- Known for: Assassination of Richard Bourke, 6th Earl of Mayo, the Viceroy of India (1869–72).

Sher Ali Afridi (died 11 March 1872) was the assassin of the Viceroy of British India, Lord Mayo whom he killed on 8 February 1872.

An Indian soldier of Pashtun background, he was convicted of murder and imprisoned at the penal colony of Port Blair, Andaman Islands. He is known for assassinating the Viceroy of India in 1872. The British sources described him as a "fearless soldier and one who would have been selected for any service of danger".

== Early life ==
Sher Ali was born in the Tirah Valley in the Khyber Agency of the North-West Frontier Province of British India into the Kuki Khēl Afridi tribe of Pashtuns. He worked for the colonial government in the Punjab Police in the 1860s. Afridi worked for the Commissioner of Peshawar. He was in colonial army at Ambala in a cavalry regiment. He served in the Presidency armies in Rohilkhand and Oudh during the Indian Rebellion of 1857. He worked under Major Hugh James as a cavalry trooper in Peshawar and as a mounted orderly for Reynell Taylor, who awarded Sher Ali with a horse, pistol and certificate. Due to his good character, Sher Ali was popular among Europeans and was taking care of Taylor's children.

Afridi had murdered a robber who attempted to steal his cattle and his wife. Afridi was pardoned for this murder.

== Transportation to Andaman ==
In 1867, he killed Hyder who was one of his enemies at Peshawar (Indian territory where British jurisdiction applied) in broad daylight. Although he pleaded innocence, he was sentenced to death on 2 April 1867. On appeal, his sentence was reduced by a judge, Colonel Pollock, to life imprisonment and he was deported to the Andaman and Nicobar Islands, to serve his sentence. He was permitted to work as a barber at Port Blair as he was acknowledged to have behaved well since his arrival.

== Murder of Lord Mayo ==
Richard Bourke, 6th Earl of Mayo, Viceroy of India from 1869, was visiting the Andaman and Nicobar Islands in February 1872. The island group was then used as a British penal colony for convicts from India, both criminals and political prisoners. Lord Mayo was involved in drafting the regulations of Port Blair, the principal town of the islands. On 8 February, when the Viceroy had almost completed his inspection and was returning at 7:00 PM to his boat, where Lady Mayo was also waiting, Sher Ali Afridi appeared from the dark and stabbed him. Sher Ali was immediately arrested by twelve security personnel. Lord Mayo soon bled to death. This incident, which attracted much attention to the island group, happened at the foot of Mount Harriet (now Mount Manipur).

== Aftermath ==
The murder of the Viceroy, the supreme official of India appointed by the British Crown, sent shockwaves throughout Britain and British India. Sher Ali Afridi wanted to kill two British people, the Superintendent and the Viceroy, as a revenge for his sentence, which he thought was more severe than he deserved. He waited for a full day and only in the evening, found an opportunity to kill the Viceroy. He said that he killed on the instructions of God. He readily posed for photographs. Some jihadist-inspired prisoners were jailed at Andaman during the same period but the British found no link to the murder of the Viceroy and the presence of these prisoners. Sher Ali Afridi was condemned to death and was hanged on the gallows of Viper Island prison, on 11 March 1872.

== See also ==
- Mohammad Abdullah (India)

== Bibliography ==
- F. A. M. Dass (1937): The Andaman Islands.
- Prof. Sen : Disciplining Punishment: Colonialism and Convict Society in the Andaman Islands. Oxford University Press.
