= Mohammad Abdullah (India) =

Indian freedom fighter

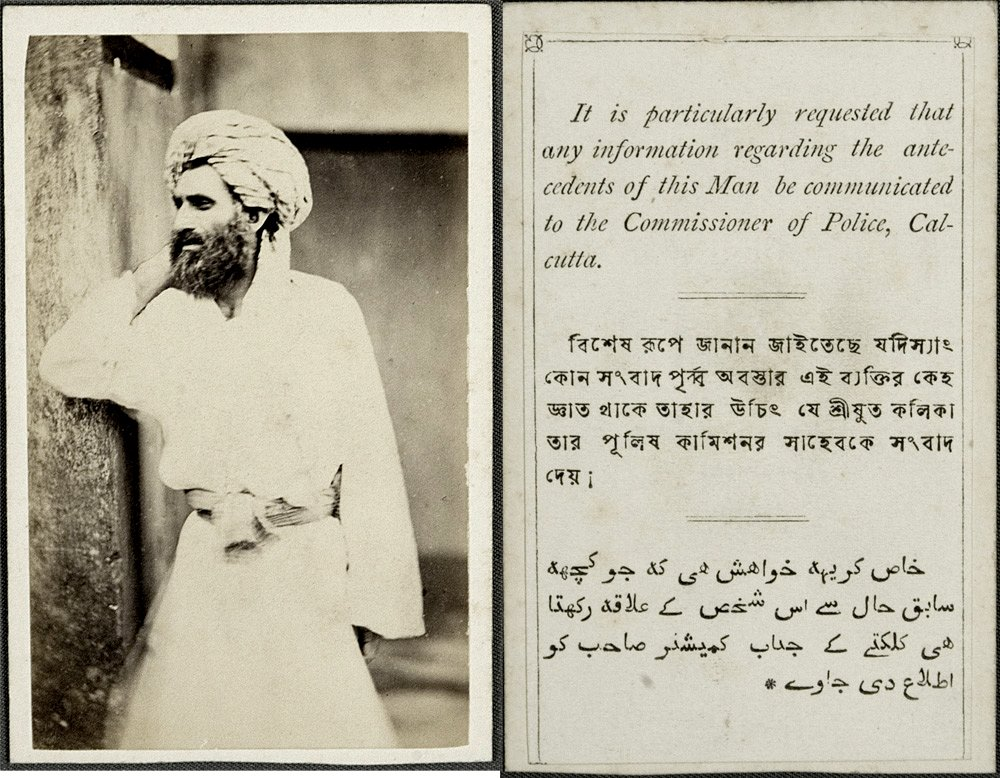
Abdulla, the murderer of Judge John Paxton Norman of Calcutta, 1871

Mohammad Abdullah, also called Abdulla or Abdullah, was an Indian advocate of the end of British rule, who is known for killing John Paxton Norman, Chief Justice in the High Court at Fort William in Bengal, in British India.

== Assassination of Norman ==
Justice Norman was accused of giving harsh sentence to freedom fighters. This was the main reason for the assassination.

In 1871, while Norman was coming down the steps of the Kolkata Town Hall, Abdullah, attacked him and stabbed him to death. He died on 21 September 1871.

== See also ==
- Sher Ali Afridi
- Ashfaqulla Khan
