= Port Blair Municipal Council =

Governing body in Port Blair, India

Port Blair Municipal Council Sri Vijaya Puram Municipal Council
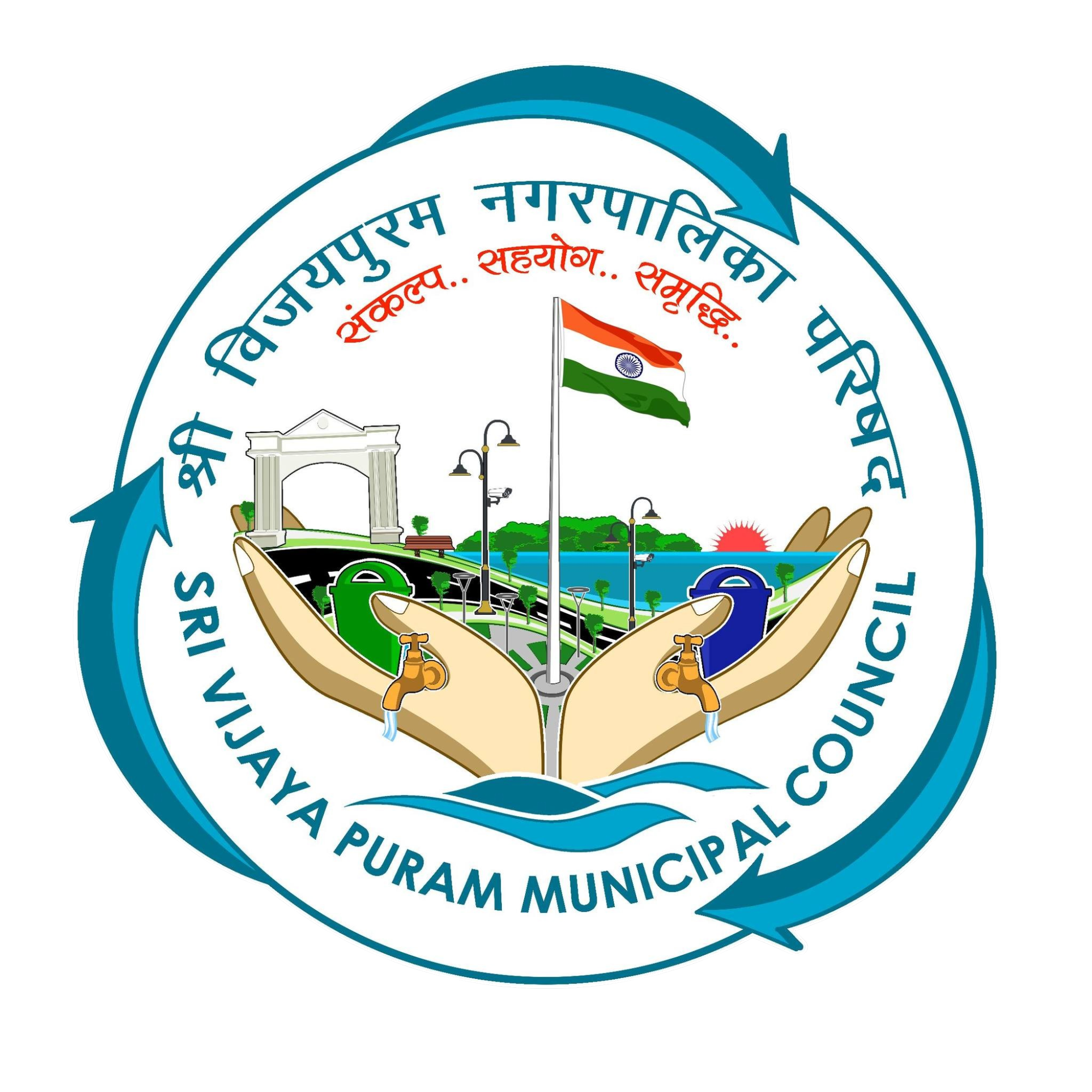

Type
- Type: Municipal council

History
- Founded: 2 October 1957 (69 years ago)

Leadership
- Chairperson: Sudeep Rai Sharma, BJP since 25 April 2025
- Senior Vice Chairperson: D. Radhika, BJP since 25 April 2025
- Junior Vice Chairperson: Rajesh Ram, BJP since 25 April 2025
- Secretary: Smitha R, IAS

Structure
- Seats: 25
- Political groups: Government (14) NDA (14): BJP (11); TDP (2); IND (1); Opposition (11): INC (10); DMK (1)

Elections
- Last election: 2022
- Next election: 2027

Meeting place
- Indira Bhavan

Website
- pbmc.gov.in

Port Blair Municipal Council, officially Sri Vijaya Puram Municipal Council, is the civic body that governs the city of Port Blair, the capital of the Indian union territory of Andaman and Nicobar Islands. The council came into existence on 2 October 1957 as per the Andaman and Nicobar Islands (Municipal Board's) Regulation enacted on 11 March 1957. It covers an area of 44.22 km^{2} (17.07 sq mi) and had a population of 140,572 as per the 2011 census.

== History ==
Local government in Port Blair was first established in 1957 when the Andaman and Nicobar Islands (Municipal) Regulation was promulgated by the President of India and led to the creation of the Port Blair Municipal Board, with them being granted local self-government in 1960. Under the Seventy-fourth Amendment of the Constitution of India in 1994, the Port Blair Municipal Board was reconstituted as the Port Blair Municipal Council in 1995.

In 2016, the Port Blair Municipal Council started a campaign to end open defecation in their municipality. They took a survey and started building more public toilets and declared in 2017 that they were "open defecation free". In the same year, the council announced that they were going to be leading an experiment to repair roads with plastic waste.

== Council ==
Former logo of the Port Blair Municipal Council

Port Blair Municipal Council comprises 24 wards after the expansion of the municipal limits in 2015. The councilors are directly elected for a term of five years, and the council is led by a chairperson. The recent elections for the council were held in 2022.

=== Electoral history ===
Year	BJP	INC	TDP	DMK	Others	IND	Total	Ref.
2005	5	6	0	2	3	2	18	
2010	4	9	1	1	3	0	18	
2015	11	6	2	1	1	3	24	
2022	10	10	2	1	0	1	24	

=== Members ===
The following are currently elected councillors:

Ward	Councillor	Party	Notes
1	S. Shahul Hameed	Telugu Desam Party	Chairman
2	R. Someshwara Rao	Bharatiya Janata Party	
3	Ramzan Ali	Indian National Congress	
4	Abdul Islam	Indian National Congress	
5	S. Selvi	Telugu Desam Party	
6	Azizur Rahman	Bharatiya Janata Party	
7	Amar Devi	Indian National Congress	
8	Lakshmi Ganeshan	Indian National Congress	
9	V. Ravi Chandran	Dravida Munnetra Kazhagam	
10	T. Mangayarkarasi	Indian National Congress	
11	Sanjeev Reddy	Indian National Congress	
12	Vasantha	Indian National Congress	
13	Sudeep Rai Sharma	Indian National Congress	
14	Y. Joga Rao	Indian National Congress	
15	B. Padmanabham	Bharatiya Janata Party	
16	C. Karunanidhi	Bharatiya Janata Party	
17	Dharmendra Narayan	Bharatiya Janata Party	
18	Rajesh Pal Govind	Bharatiya Janata Party	
19	V. Vetrivelu	Indian National Congress	
20	Pandi Selvi	Bharatiya Janata Party	
21	A. Selva Rani	Bharatiya Janata Party	
22	Rajesh Ram	Bharatiya Janata Party	
23	D. Radhika	Bharatiya Janata Party	Elected as Independent, joined BJP in May 2025
24	U. Kavitha	Bharatiya Janata Party	
