= Kolkata Town Hall =

Building in Kolkata, India

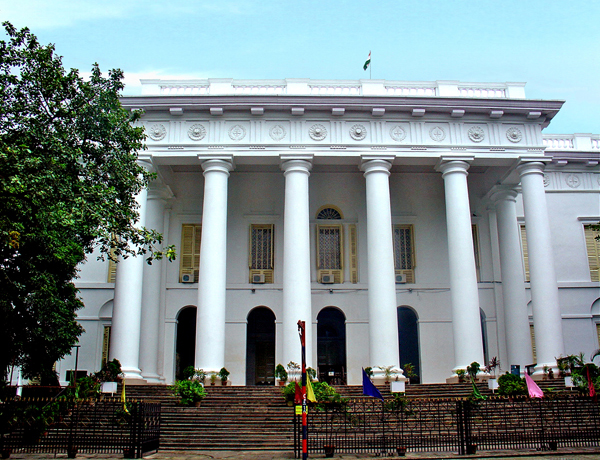
- Town Hall of Kolkata
- Interactive map of the Kolkata Town Hall area

General information
- Architectural style: Roman Doric
- Location: B.B.D. Bagh, Kolkata, India, 4, Esplanade Row (West), Kolkata - 700001
- Coordinates: 22°34′05″N 88°20′42″E
- Completed: 1813
- Owner: Kolkata Municipal Corporation

Design and construction
- Architect: Col. John Garstin

References
- Kolkata Town Hall

Kolkata Town Hall in Roman Doric style, was built in 1813 by the architect and engineer Major General John Henry Garstin (1756–1820) with a fund of 700,000 Rupees raised from a lottery to provide the Europeans with a place for social gatherings.

== History of the building ==
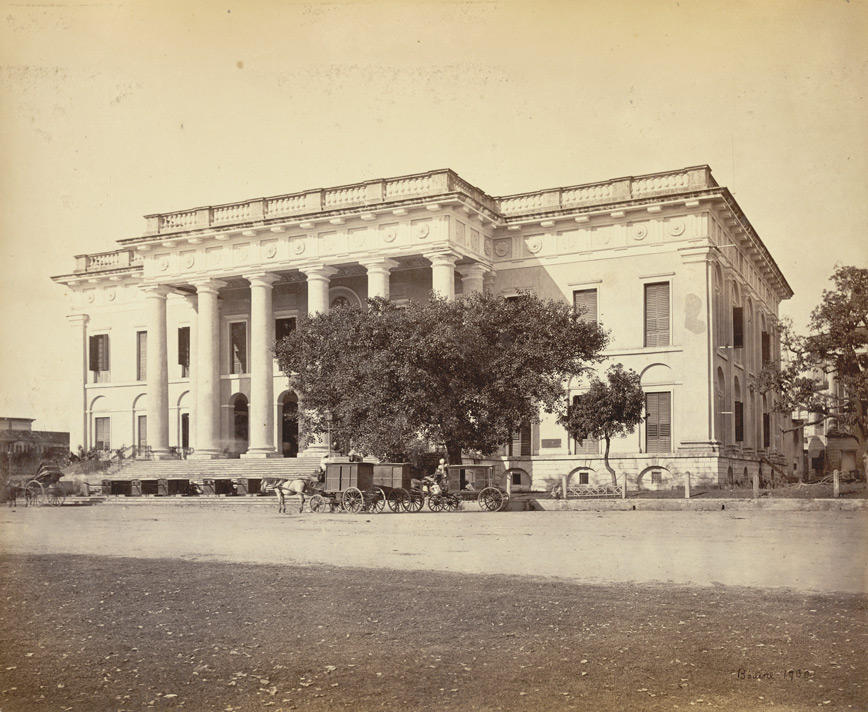
The Town Hall in the 1860s.

=== 1813–1900 ===
The building of the Town Hall was made in Roman-Doric style in 1813. At first, the hall was placed under a committee, which allowed the public to use the hall under such terms and conditions as were fixed by the Government. The public could visit the ground floor hall to see statues and large size portrait paintings but they were not allowed indiscriminate access to the upper storey. Applications for the use of the upper storey were to be made to the committee. After the establishment of the University of Calcutta, annual examinations of the university used to be held here till the year 1872 after which she got her own building.

In 1867, Town Hall came under the management of the municipal authority, the Justices of Peace for the improvement of the town of Kolkata (later on the Calcutta Corporation). In the 1870s, at the time of Chief Justice Richard Couch, when the present building of the High Court was being built, the Town Hall was temporarily used for judicial purposes. In 1871, one of the puisne judges, Sir John Paxton Norman was assassinated by a fanatic Muslim of the Wahabi sect, while coming down the steps of the Town Hall. In the year of 1897, the Town Hall had been renovated at a cost of about Rs. 1.1266 million.

=== 1900–1947 ===
During 1906 Indian National Congress Calcutta session, in the presidentship of Dadabhai Naoroji the resolution of Swadeshi was adopted in response to the partition of India by Viceroy Lord Curzon.In 1914, almost all the marble statues except the statue of Ramanath Tagore have been shifted to Victoria Memorial. After the introduction of the Dyarchy in 1919, the Town Hall was used as the council chamber of the Bengal Legislative Council. The interior of the Hall was remodeled to suit the needs of the Council. The President of the Council had his chamber in the Town Hall. Subsequently, the Legislative Council moved to its new building in 1931.

During the Second World War, the government temporarily opened a Rationing Office in the Hall.

=== Post-independence ===
After Independence, the Town Hall Building was largely neglected, during the early days of independence, during the 'Socialist Era' of early independence and seems to have been steadily consigned to collective oblivion. It was converted into the Municipal Magistrate's Office. Other branches of the Corporation were accommodated within its premises. The Municipal Service Commission and the West Bengal Public Service Commission also occupied parts of the building. In 1975, all marble busts along with some portrait paintings were shifted to the Victoria Memorial Hall except the busts of Greenlaw and Palmer. The rest numbers of portrait paintings had also been shifted to Central Municipal Office building leaving two portrait paintings of Ryan and Nott at Town Hall. Gradually, this magnificent building with rich heritage was sunk into oblivion. In 1998, by timely intervention of the ASI and the Calcutta High Court, this heritage building was saved from further damage and destruction – and was later renovated to its former glory, and is now used for public gatherings and functions.

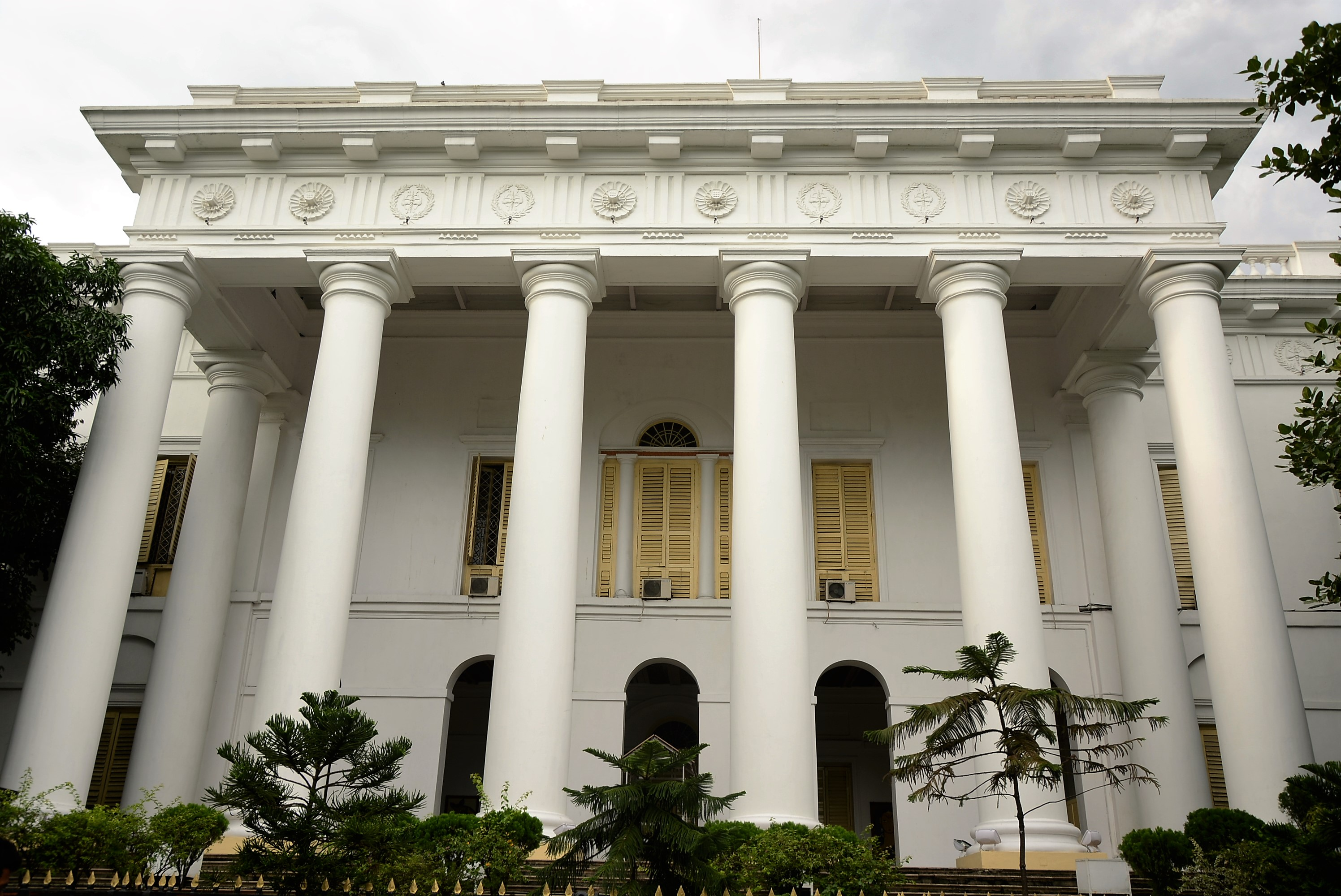
Town Hall

== Town Hall Library ==
In 1999, Corporation purchased the entire collection of rare books and journals on Kolkata from the noted Kolkata expert P. T. Nair to form a reference library. In 2004, the library was formally opened by the then Minister of Library Services, Nimai Mal in a small function presided over by the then Mayor Subrata Mukherjee. In 2007, the entire reference library of the Corporation has been amalgamated with the Town Hall Library. Now the library possesses about 12,000 books and journals and is visited by many scholars from different corners of India and abroad. Some rare valuable books held by the library:

- Charles Ball. The History of Indian Mutiny.
- The Diary of William Hedge.
- Calcutta Light Horse – 1759-1881-1947.
- A Claude Campbell. Glimpses of Bengal.
- Catalogue of the Pictures and Sculptures in the collection of the Maharaja Tagore.
- Wilmot Corfiled. Calcutta faces and places in pre-camera days.
- Joseph Emin. The life and Adventures of Joseph Emin: an American.
- E. d. Ezra. Turning back the pages: A chronicle of Calcutta Jewry.
- Henry Hyde. Parochial Annals of Bengal.
- Parish of Bengal, 1678 to 1788.
- Charles Lushington. The history, design and present state of the benevolent and charitable institution, founded by the British in Calcutta and its vicinity.
- Charles Moor. The Sheriffs of Fort William from 1775 to 1926.
- Rabbi Ezekiel N Musleah on the Banks of the Ganga.
- O Connell. The Park Street Cemeteries – Hand book of the Principle monuments.
- The Outram Statue, Calcutta
- D. L. Richarson. Literary Recreations.
- Smoult & Ryan. Rules and orders of the supreme court of judicature at Fort William in Bengal.
- Stark and Madge. East Indian worthies.
- Willkinson. Two Monsoons.
- William Bolts. Considerations on Indian Affairs.
- Rev. Lal behari De. Recollections of Alexander Duff. (with author's signature)
- Harry Hobbs. The Romance of the Calcutta sweep. (with author's copy)
- Sir Upendranath Brahmachari. Gleanings from my researches: Kala-azar, its Chemotherapy.
- Calcutta Exhibition, Official Hand Book and Guide. 1923.
- Narendra Nath Laha. Subarnabanik, Katha O Kirthi.
- Ramcomal Sen. Dictionary of English and Bengal.

There are also biographies, Calcutta Review, Modern Review, Bengal Past and Present, Journal of the Asiatic Society, and Calcutta Municipal Gazette and other publications of CMC.

== Kolkata Museum ==
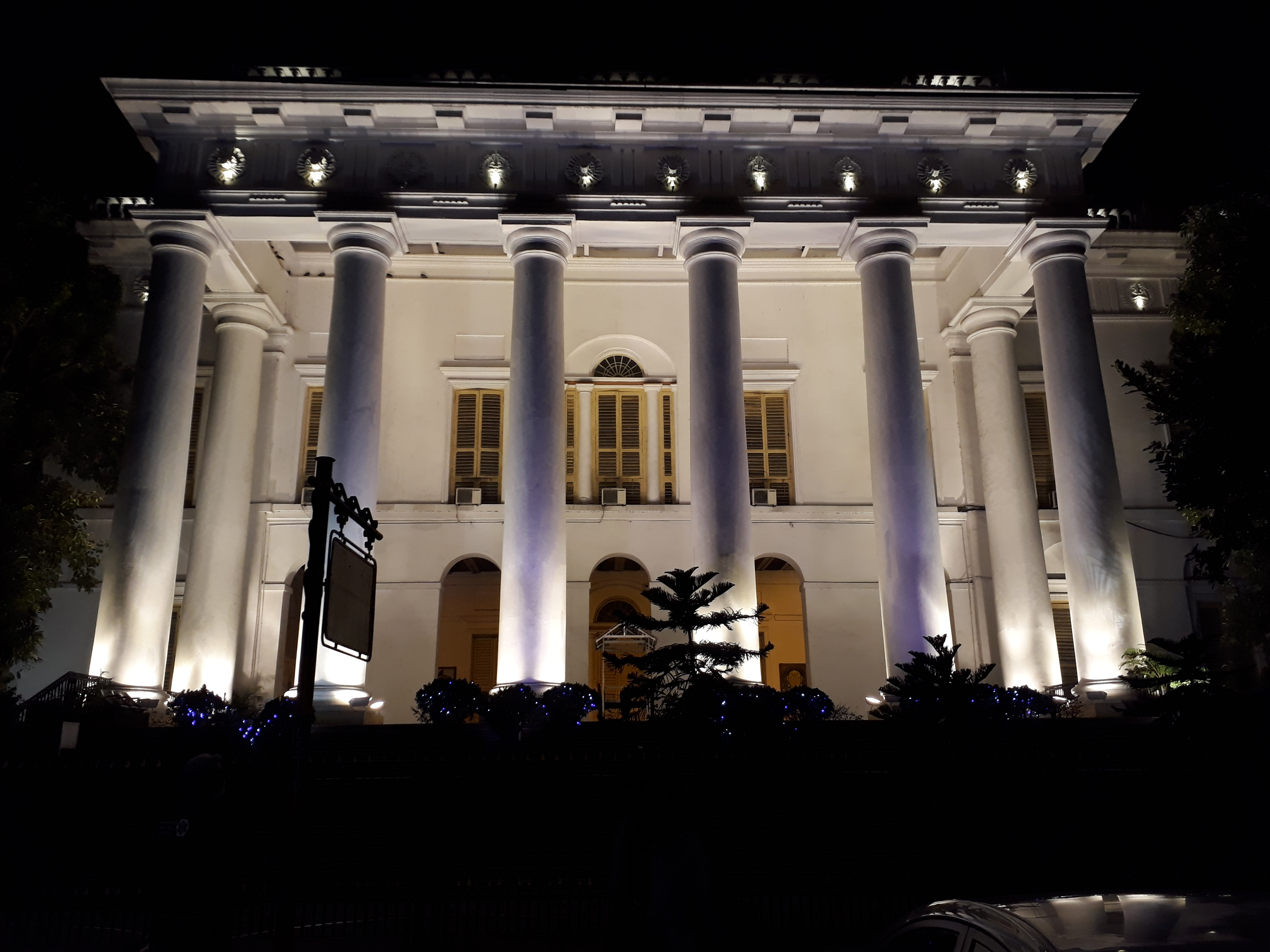
Town Hall at night

The Kolkata Museum was set up in 1995 by a joint initiative of Kolkata Municipal Corporation and Government of West Bengal. It depicts the History of the City of Kolkata, and the adjoining metropolis. It was made by the Kolkata Museum society, members of which included renowned historians, museologists, and administrators of this metropolis. Kolkata Museum is a story-telling media exhibit on the history of the city of Kolkata, financed by Kolkata Municipal Corporation, Kolkata Metropolitan Development Authority, Department of Information & Culture of the Government of West Bengal, and Ford Foundation. Divided in 19 enclaves and covering an area of 1200 sq mt, the exhibit depicts the story of Kolkata, its social and political history, tumultuous freedom movement, its creative efforts in the domains of education, literature, music, performing art, science, and technology. The communication technology involves animated walk-through dioramas where visitors walk through the streets of early Kolkata or witnesses the high drama of the Battle of Plassey right at the centre of the battlefield. Fully computerised circarama where a 12-minute story of India’s freedom movement is projected on a large circular screen surrounding the visitors; it takes the help of animatronics where visitors witness poet and Nobel Laureate Rabindranath Tagore reciting 'Bharat Tirtha' and singing 'Tobu Mone Rekho'. Dramatic events of the Golden Time (1856–61) or the trauma of the 1940s are also projected. Visitors can listen to old popular music of the bygone days through audio isolators avoiding interference with others or choose to view selected clippings of the films of people like Pramathesh Barua, Debaki Bose, Madhu Bose, Satyajit Ray, Mrinal Sen, Ritwik Ghatak and others.

== Popular culture ==
The town hall is a very famous and important landmark of Kolkata. During the British Raj the town hall was the most important place for social gatherings in Calcutta and many important state functions of the British East India Company were held here. The hall has been witness to many historic proclamations and events during the 19th and 20th century. It was considered an elite place for public gatherings by the Europeans. Nowadays, many functions of the Government of West Bengal are held here. The town hall was featured on the sixth leg of The Amazing Race 18, when the teams had to compete in a tea-drinking "Roadblock".
