= John Paxton Norman =

English jurist

Sir John Paxton Norman (21 October 1819 – 21 September 1871) was an English jurist who was the acting chief Justice of the Calcutta High Court. He was assassinated in 1871.

== Career ==
Paxton Norman was born in 1819; his father John Norman was a banker of Somerset. He was educated at Exeter Grammar School and Exeter College, Oxford, and then practiced as a special pleader. In 1862 he was called to the bar at the Inner Temple. In British India he worked as a Puisne Judge of The Supreme Court of Judicature at Fort William till 1871. Sir Paxton Norman was appointed as acting Chief Justice of the Calcutta High Court in 1870.

Paxton Norman was unpopular among Wahabis for imposing heavy sentences. He was the author of many legal treatises and papers, and also took active part in Calcutta University as the president of the Law faculty.

== Death ==
In 1871, while Norman was coming down the steps of the Kolkata Town Hall, an Indian Wahabi named Mohammad Abdullah stabbed him to death. He died on 21 September 1871. Sir Paxton Norman was buried in St. Paul's Cathedral, Kolkata.
