= Archibald Blair =

Surveyor in the Bombay Marine

Blair's chart of Manori Creek, Island of Salsette (now part of Greater Mumbai), surveyed in 1777

Archibald Blair (1752–1815) was a naval surveyor and lieutenant in the Bombay Marine. He is particularly noted for his surveys of the Chagos Archipelago and the Andaman Islands.

His father was the Rev. Archibald Blair, minister of Garvald, East Lothian. His older brother Robert became Professor of Astronomy at the University of Edinburgh. Archibald Blair joined the Bombay Marine, received his first commission in 1771 and was promoted captain in 1792. In 1772, as a midshipman, he went on his first survey mission along the coasts of India, Iran and Arabia. In 1780 he was lieutenant on a ship captured by a French man-of-war off the Cape of Good Hope. He was kept prisoner by the French until 1784 when they handed him over to the Dutch who returned him to the Bombay Marine that same year. He was given the then considerable sum of £200 on account of his long captivity and suffering. Between 1786 and 1788 he took part in a number of survey missions, to the Chagos Archipelago, to Diamond Harbour south of Calcutta and to adjacent parts of the Hooghly River.

The Chagos archipelago, in the southern Indian Ocean, was of interest both as a hazard to shipping, being low lying, and as a potential staging post for vessels en route to India via the Cape of Good Hope. A British attempt to form a settlement in 1786 was unsuccessful, as the islands were unable to support the necessary cultivation, and were considered difficult to fortify. But Blair, head surveyor on the expedition, carried out a detailed survey, starting with Diego Garcia, and then examining the other islands in the group. He established longitude both by lunar distances and by using an eclipse of one of the moons of Jupiter. The work resulted in the publication of several charts and views, as well as a report on the survey, published by Alexander Dalrymple, Hydrographer of the East India Company. The charts were the most accurate made to that time, and remained in use for about sixty years.

Blair's next assignment was to the Andaman Islands, again with a view to establishing a settlement. On his first voyage, between December 1788 and April 1789, he surveyed the southern part of Great Andaman Island, identifying several harbours that might be useful, including a fine natural harbour on the SE of the island which he initially named Port Cornwallis (later renamed Port Blair after him). He surveyed hazards such as Invisible Bank, a shoal area to the SE of Great Andaman, and also visited Barren Island, a volcanic Island to the east of Great Andaman, which was in full eruption, with red-hot rocks being ejected, but no lava. As a result of his report, the Governor-general decided to colonise the islands in order to provide a safe harbour in the war against pirates. He returned to establish a permanent colony later in 1879. Over the next few years he completed his survey of the Islands, and a number of charts were published. The settlement, however, did not prosper. It never achieved self-sufficiency, nor were any permanent settlers attracted. It relied on contracted labourers, and latterly on convict labour. In 1792 Blair was ordered to relocate the settlement to North Andaman Island and hand over command to Major Alexander Kyd. The new location proved to be less healthy, and the colony was closed down in 1795.

Blair's (or Blair) Harbour is also named after Archibald Blair. This anchorage is located between Pahang on the east coast of Peninsular Malaysia and the island of Tioman. It is not clear when Blair surveyed this, but his plan of the harbour was published in 1793. On the plan the harbour is described as:

Bearing 11 1/4 S of the South End of Po. Teoman 10 leagues Lat.2°43‘N
It is very secure being skreened from both Monsoons, and is
easy of access the bottom a stiff clay. The water is good
and may be had in abundance by making Wells 5 feet deep 20
or 30 yards from high water mark.

A later chart published in 1805, simply refers to it as a good harbour. Another description of the harbour is just "The channel between Tanj.Peniabong and Keban I., N.Johore".

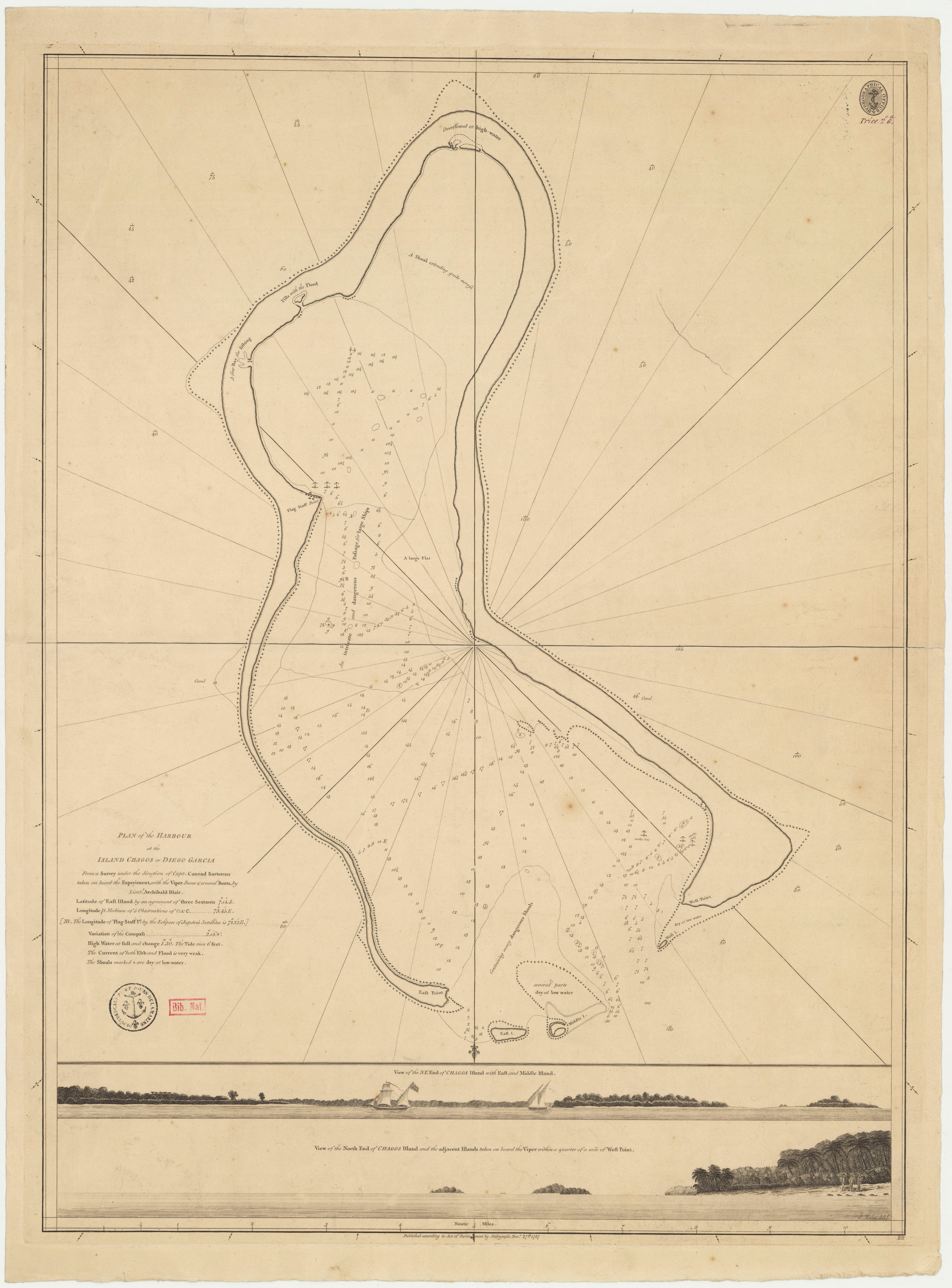
Chart of Diego Garcia Harbour, Published 1787

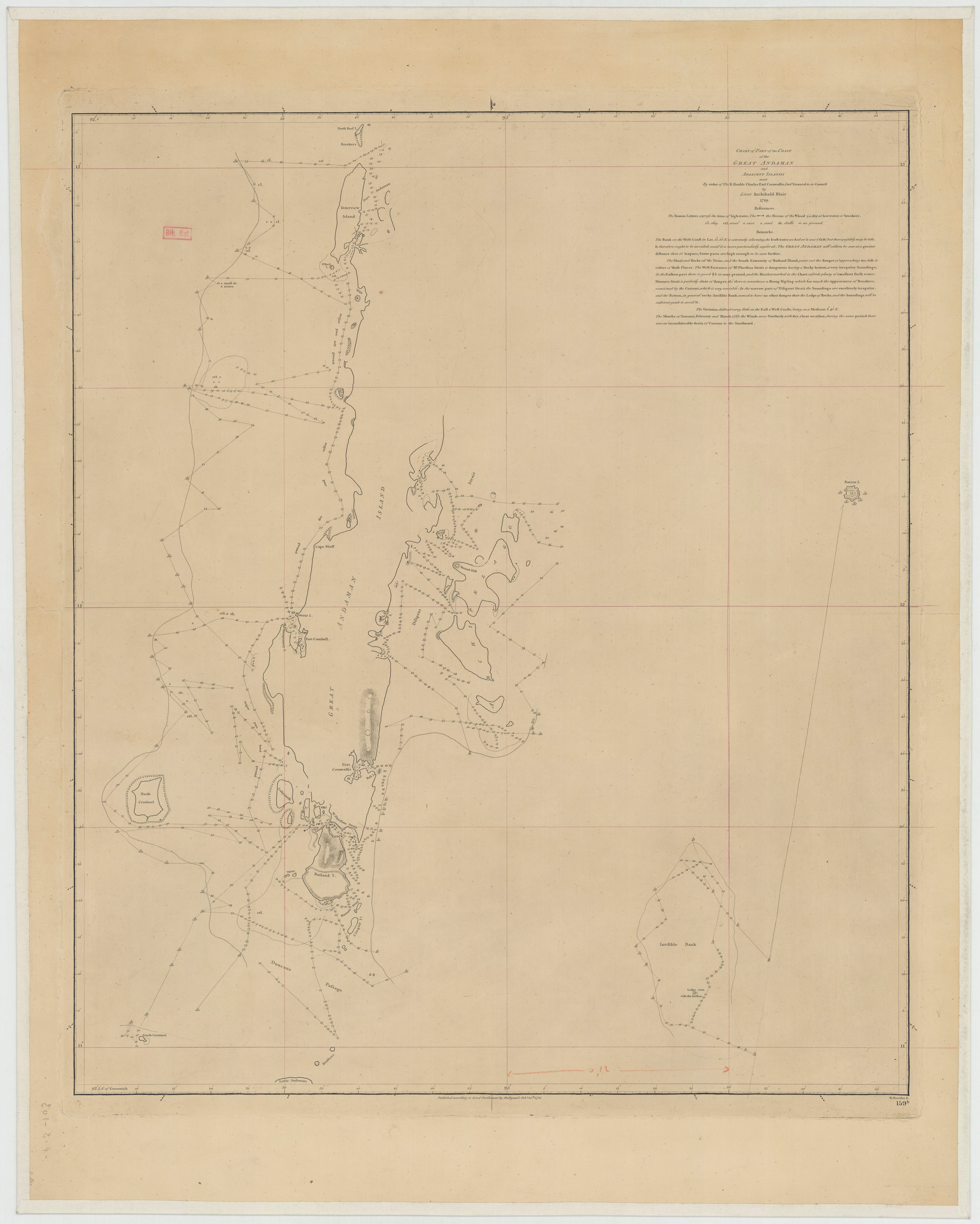
Chart of Great Andaman showing parts surveyed by Blair in 1788-1789, including Barren Island and Invisible Bank

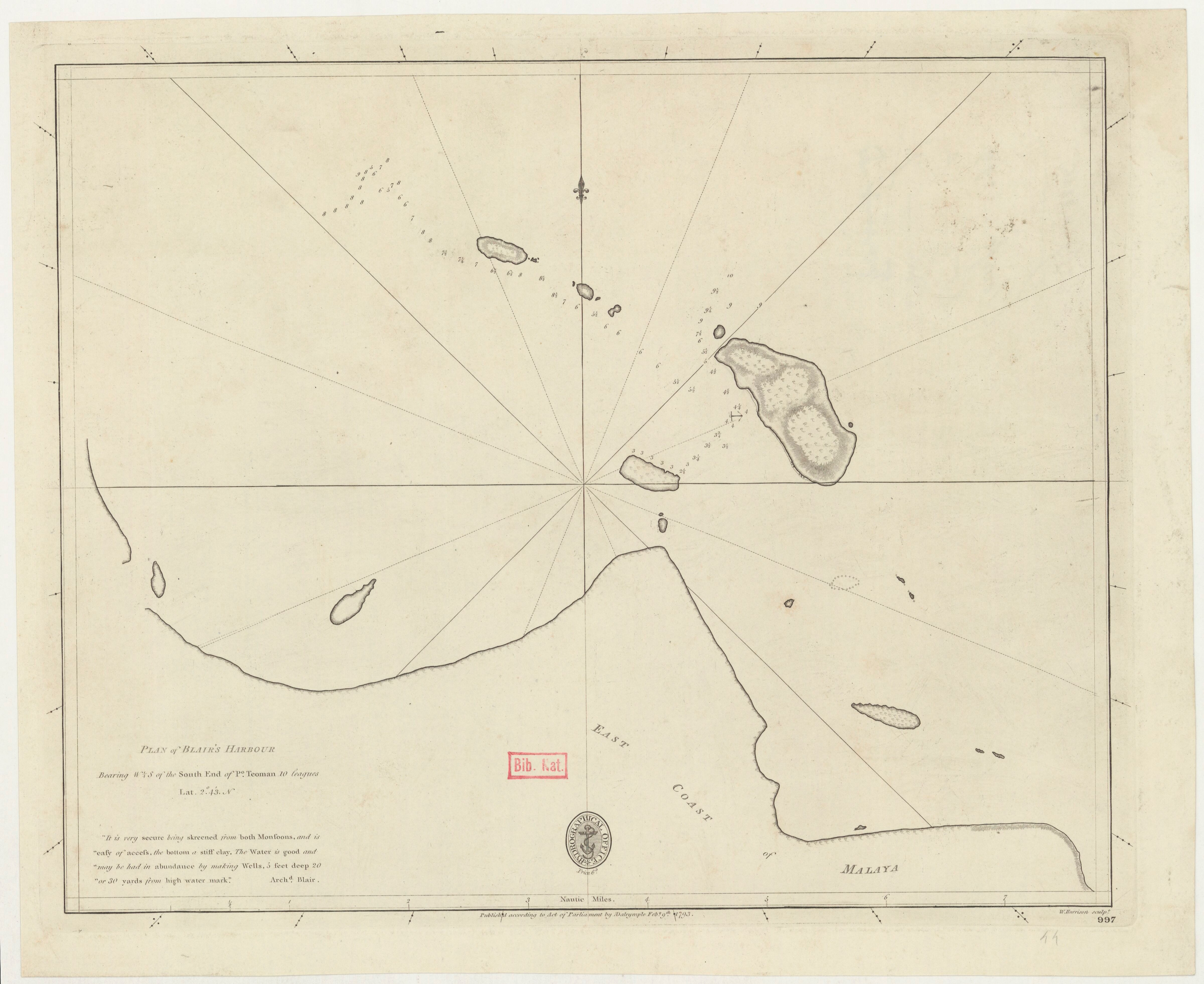
Chart of Blair's Harbour, Published 1793

Blair returned to England in 1795. He was elected a Fellow of the Royal Society in May, 1799, his candidacy citation describing him as " Archibald Blair Esqr of Bayford, Herts, Captain on the Maritime Establishment of the East India Company at Bombay a Gentleman distinguished in his profession and for astronomical observations and having been employed by The East India Company in forming an Establishment at the Andamans ". He read an account of the Andaman Islands to the Society in London in 1799.

Retiring in 1800, he settled at Bayford, Hertfordshire.

In 1803, he received a government commission in England on all cotton belonging to the Company and exported from Bombay as the reward for inventing a machine which made "a considerable improvement in the packing of cotton."

In 1814, he was given the role of Director of works for the Porthleven Harbour Company, Cornwall. It was here he directed the works which would build the harbour wall and create a safe harbour in Porthleven. From 19 August 1813, he leased a property in a local village Treleven, Sithney for a total of £262.10 shillings. The works on the harbour he would oversee would total a cost of £24,420.12.4. He was to die while undertaking this work in Cornwall and was buried at Sithney Church. He died on 25 March 1815 aged 63.
