= Viper Island =

Island of the Andaman Islands of India

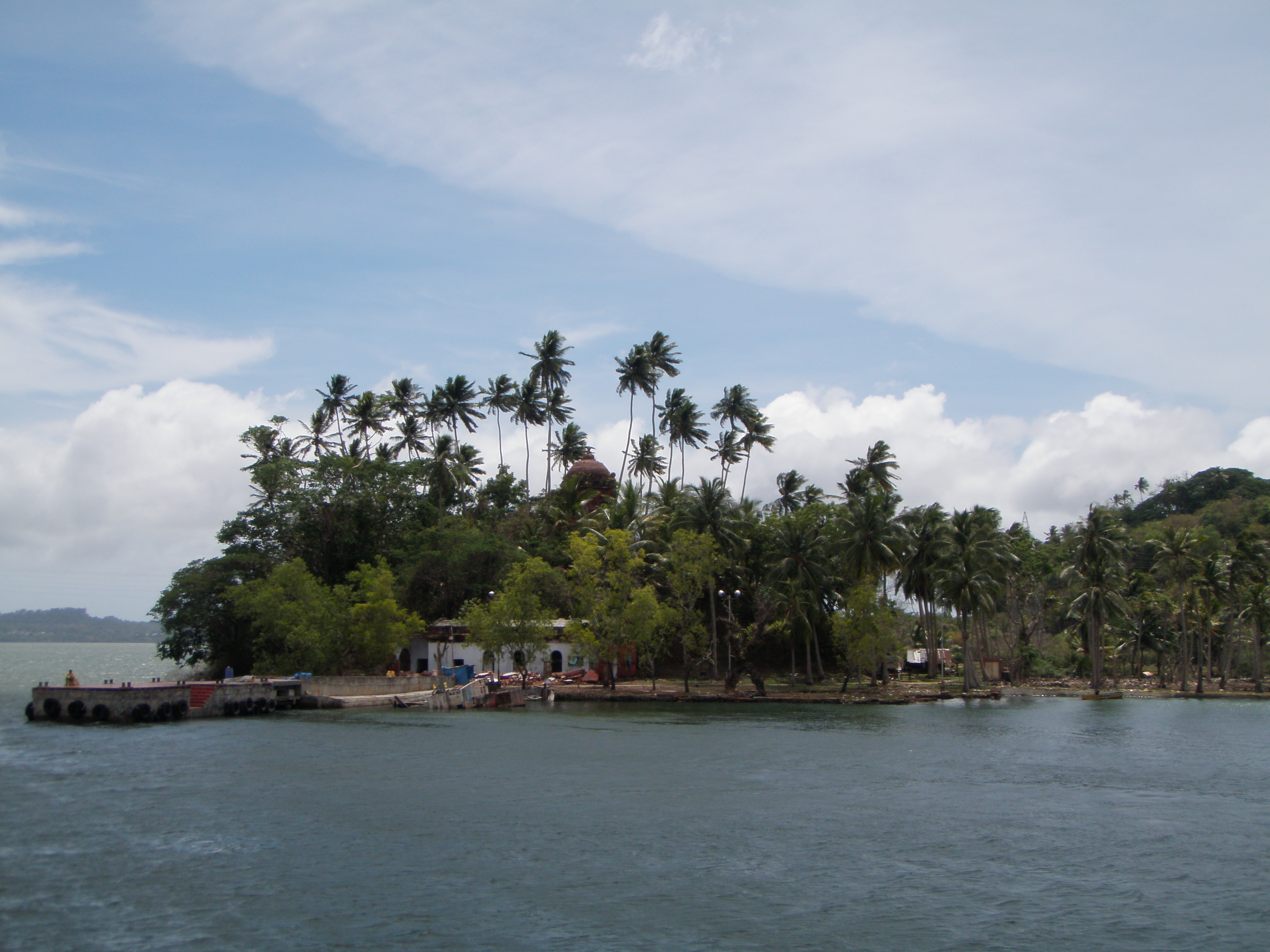

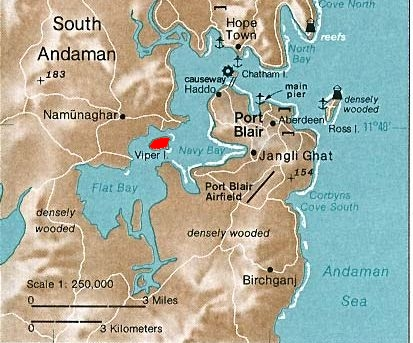
- Location of Viper Island in Navy Bay

- Location of Viper Island within Andaman and Nicobar Islands
- Etymology: from the ship H.M.S Viper which was found shipwrecked near the island

Geography
- Location: Bay of Bengal
- Coordinates: 11.661°N 92.697°E
- Archipelago: Andaman Islands
- Adjacent to: Indian Ocean
- Area: 0.335 km^{2} (0.129 sq mi)
- Length: 0.88 km (0.547 mi)
- Width: 0.50 km (0.311 mi)
- Coastline: 2.7 km (1.68 mi)
- Highest elevation: 0 m (0 ft)

Administration
- India
- District: South Andaman
- Island group: Andaman Islands
- Island sub-group: Sri Vijaya Puram Islands
- Tehsil: Sri Vijaya Puram
- Largest settlement: Viper Island (RV)

Demographics
- Population: 0 (2011)

Additional information
- Time zone: IST (UTC+5:30)
- PIN: 744202
- Telephone code: 031927
- ISO code: IN-AN-00
- Official website: www.and.nic.in

Viper Island is an island of the Andaman Islands. It belongs to the South Andaman district of the Andaman and Nicobar Islands of India.

The island lies 4 km (2 mi) west of Sri Vijaya Puram.

== History ==
Viper Island derives its name from the vessel HMS Viper in which Lt. Archibald Blair came to Andaman and Nicobar Islands in 1789. The vessel, it is believed, met with an accident and its wreckage was found near the island. This small island was the site of the jail where the British used to imprison convicts and political prisoners. It has the ruins of a gallows atop a hillock.

The jail was abandoned when the Cellular Jail was constructed in 1906. In any talk about Andaman and its role in the freedom struggle, it is the Cellular Jail that finds frequent mention. But, many years before the Cellular Jail was constructed, it was the jail at Viper Island that was used by the British to inflict the worst form of torture and hardship on those who strove to free the country from the British rule.

=== The Jail ===
The need for building a jail there was felt only after the British set up a penal settlement at Sri Vijaya Puram in 1858 to house political prisoners of the Indian Rebellion. Netaji Subhash Chandra Bose Island functioned as the headquarters of the penal settlement. Located near Sri Vijaya Puram, the construction of the Viper Jail was carried out during 1864–67. Lt. Col. Barnet Ford, the superintendent of the Penal settlement, supervised the work. Initially, a police inspector, a head constable, two sergeants, four class I constables and 30 class II constables were posted. Later on, the strength was raised gradually. Solitary cells, lock-ups, stocks and whipping stands characterized the Viper Jail. Women were also held.

The conditions at the jail were such that the place got the notorious name, "Viper Chain Gang Jail". The warden of this jail was often changed but inmates used to call the warden "The black mamba". Those who had challenged the might of the British authority were chained together and confined at night by a chain running through coupling of irons around their legs. It was at this jail that members of the Chain Gang were put to hard labour. Brij Kishore Singh Deo, popularly known as Maharaja Jagannath of Puri, was kept in the Viper Jail, where he died in 1879.

The jail has secured a permanent place in the history of the freedom struggle as it was here that Sher Ali Afridi, a Pashtun from Peshawar, was hanged after he assassinated Lord Mayo, the Viceroy of India, on February 8, 1872 at Hope Town jetty, opposite Chatham Island. After the construction of the Cellular Jail in 1906, Viper Jail's importance declined.

Today, the two-storied Jail building stands tumbled to the plinth level except for a portion of the roof with the outer wall dilapidated. A few birds which have built their nests inside the tomb of the gallows.

== Geography ==
The island belongs to the Sri Vijaya Puram and lies in the middle of Navy Bay.

== Administration ==
Politically, Viper Island, along neighbouring Sri Vijaya Puram, are part of Sri Vijaya Puram Taluk.

== Fauna ==
Spotted deer have been sighted on the island.

== Tourism ==
Viper Island is a serene beautiful tourist destination situated near Sri Vijaya Puram's harbour, and can be approached in 20 minutes from the Phoenix Bay jetty. The Harbor Cruise, available daily from the jetty, provides an overall view of different points of the harbor and a trip to this haunted Viper Island. This place is visited by number of tourists as it has multiple attractions with historical importance and also has mesmerizing picnic spots with natural picturesque environments.

== Image gallery ==
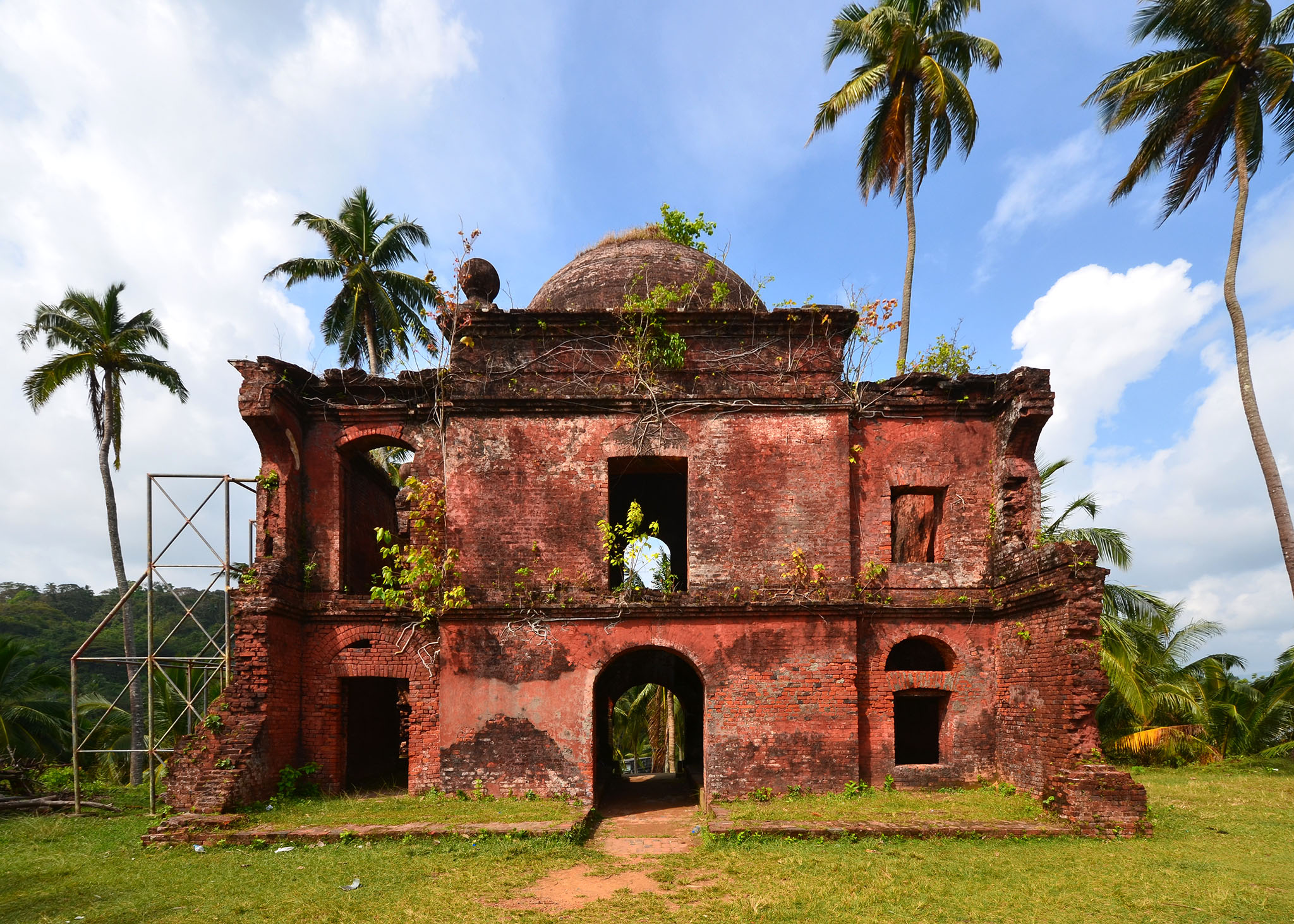
Hilltop Gallows on Viper Island
