= Port Blair =

Capital city of the Andaman and Nicobar Islands, India

- Town
- Sri Vijaya Puram
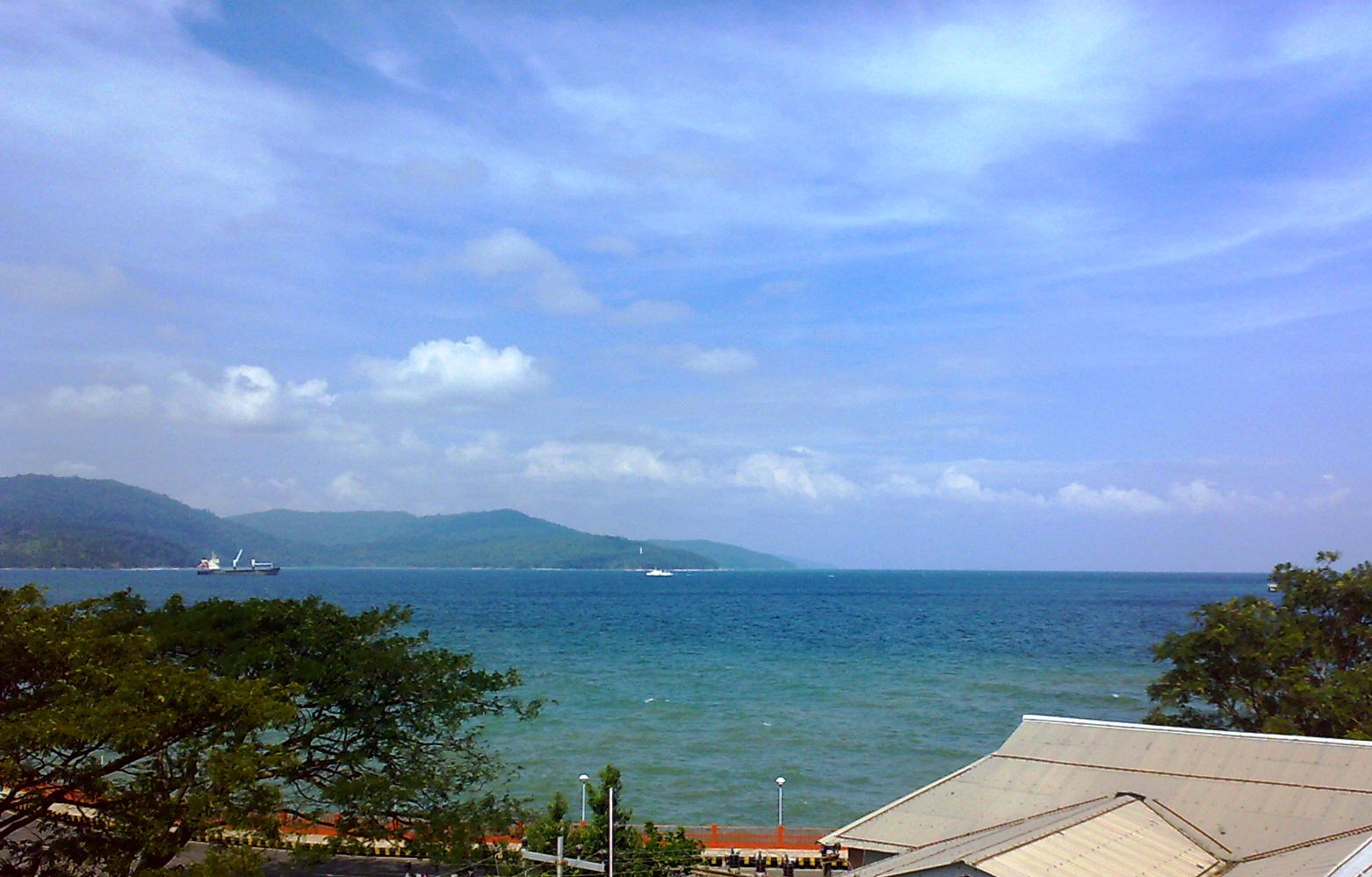
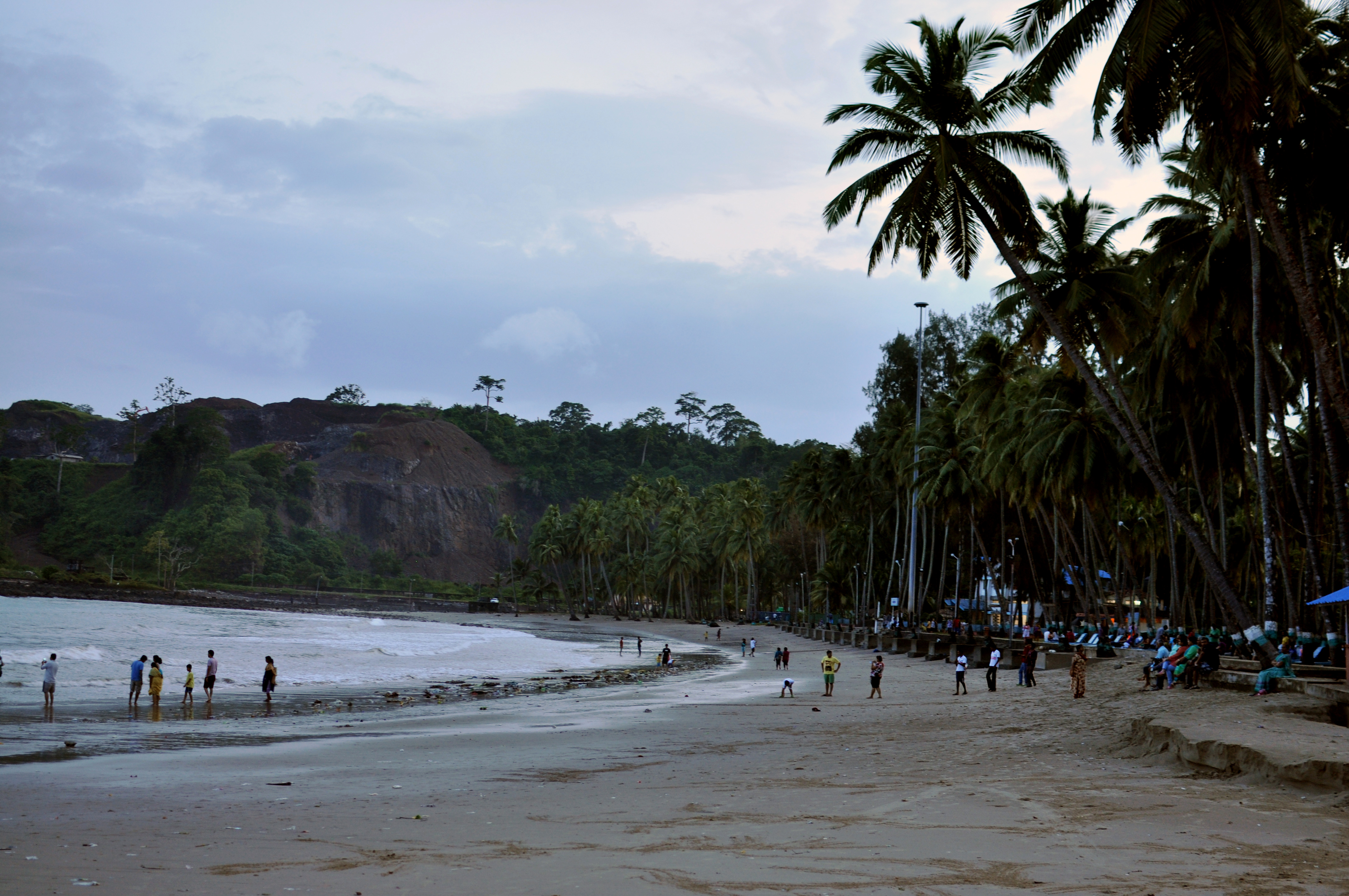
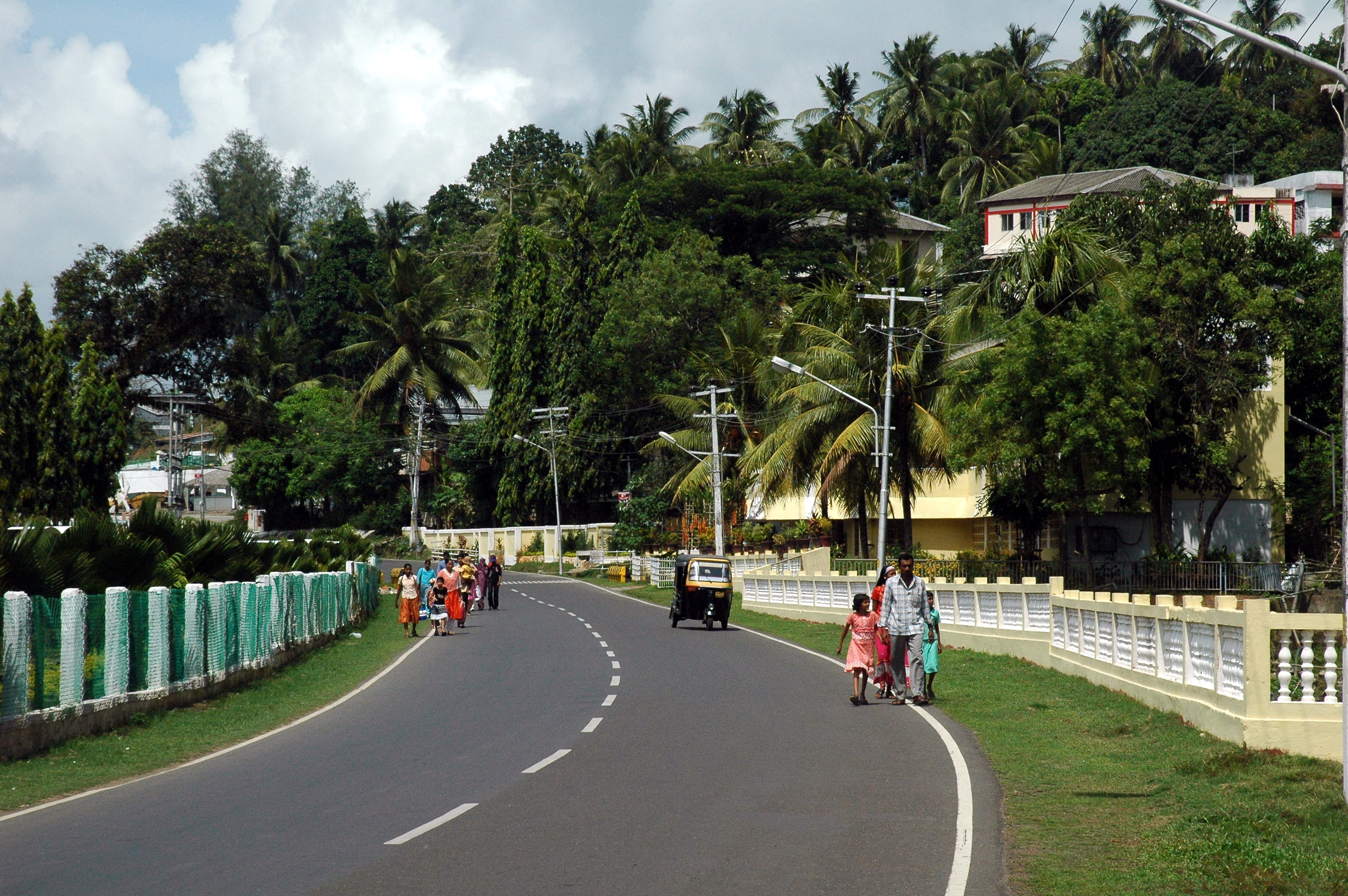
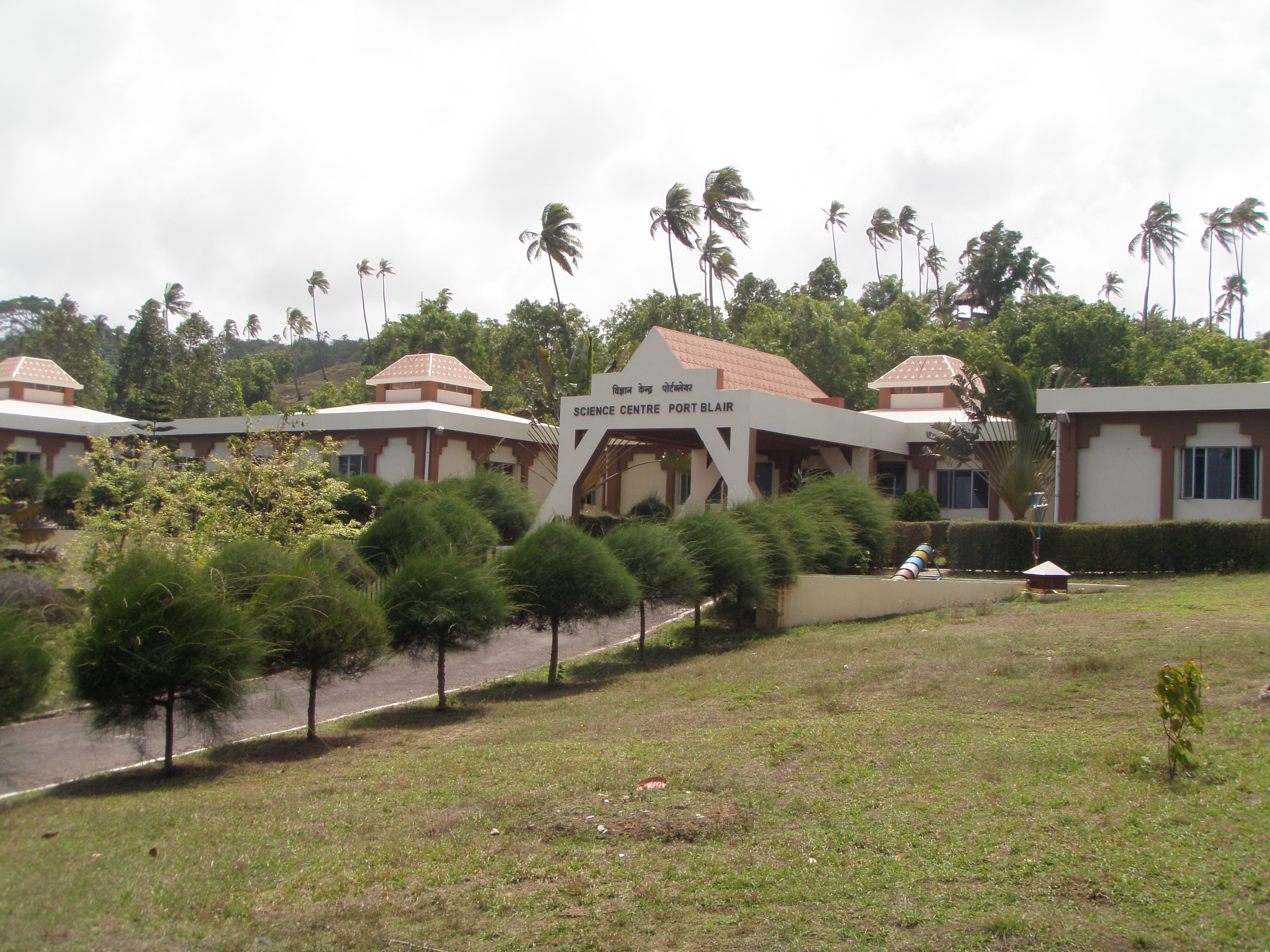
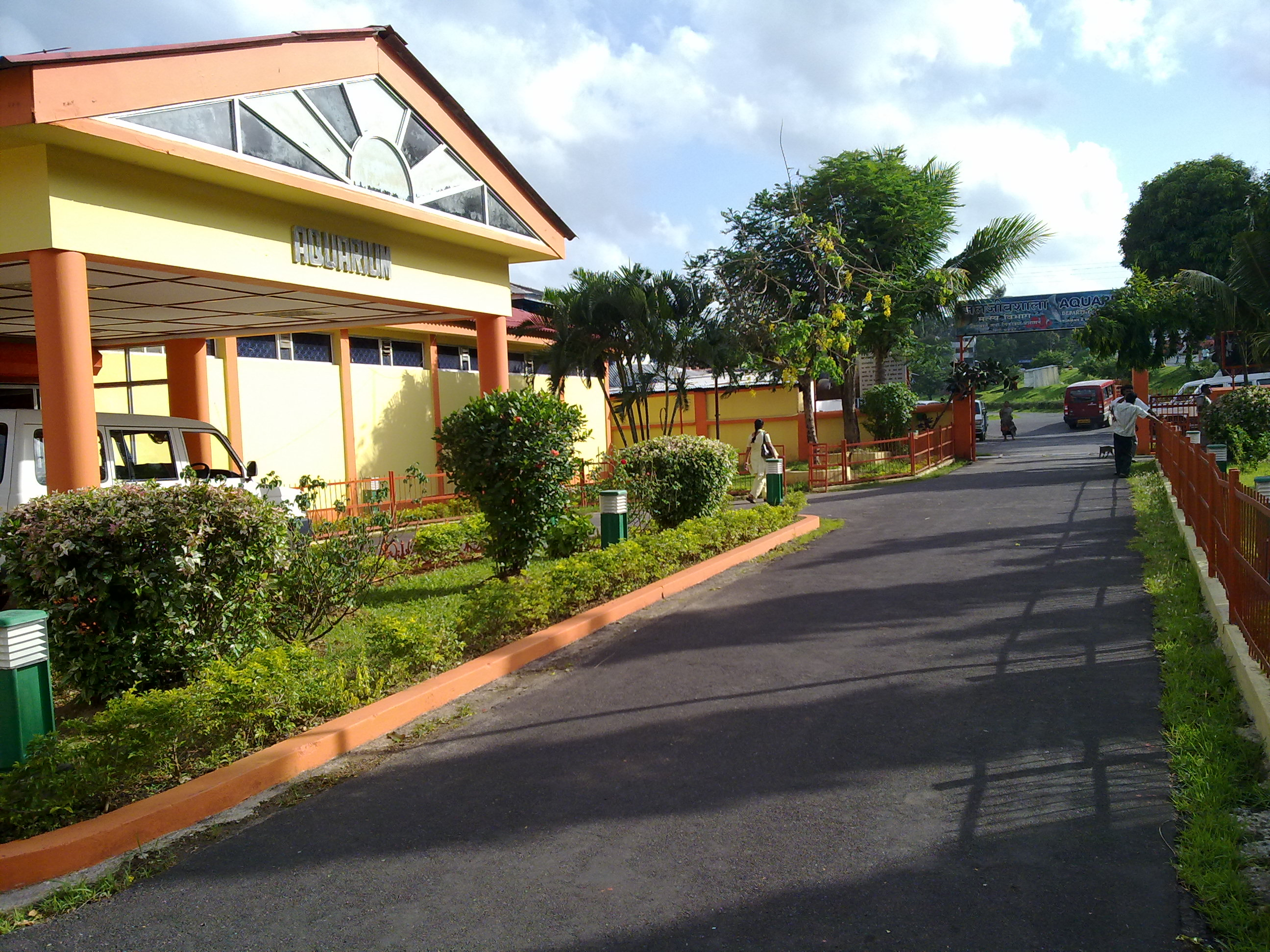
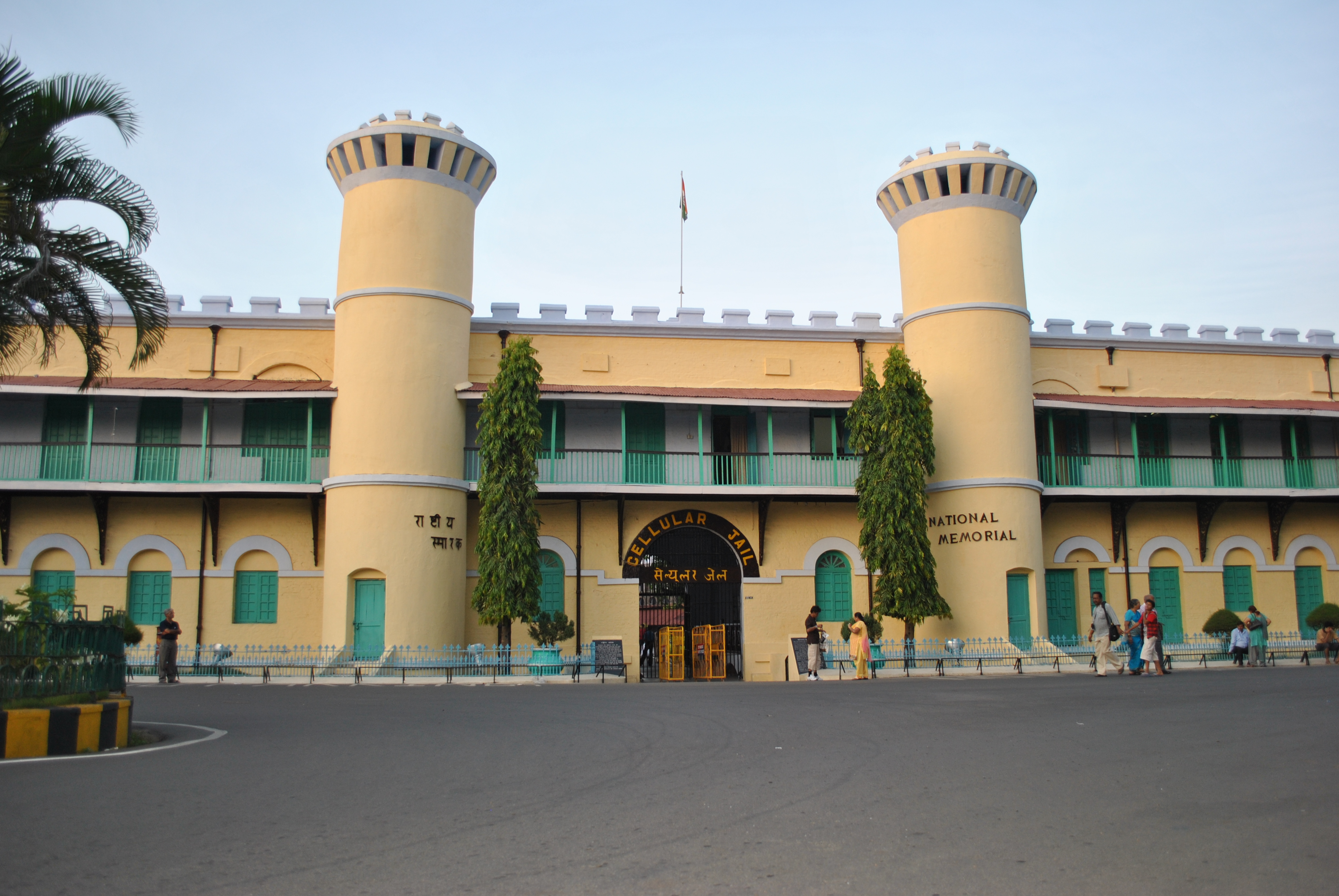
- View of Andaman Sea Corbyn's cove beach A seaside road Science centre Jaljeevshala aquarium Cellular Jail

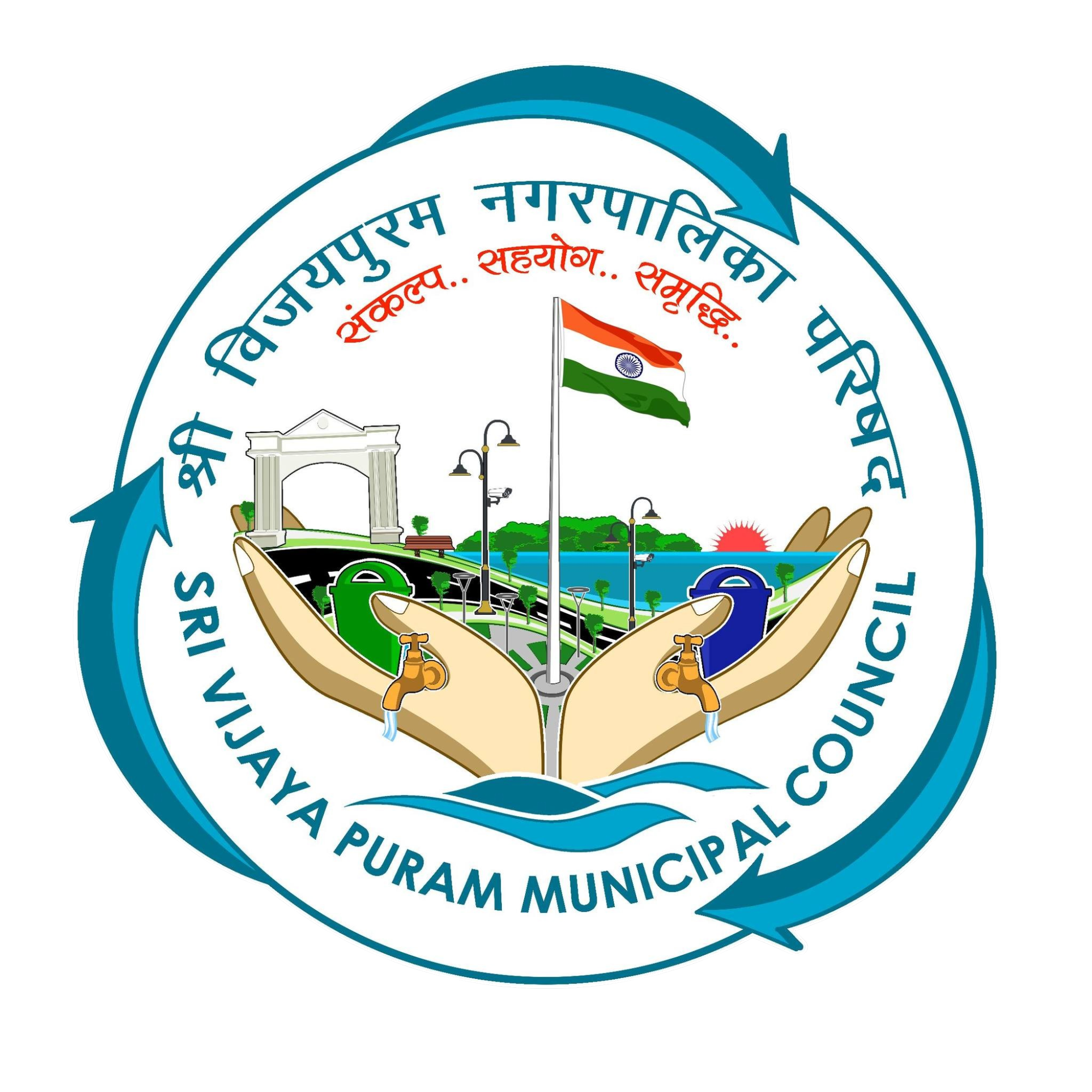
- Seal of the Port Blair Municipal Council

- Location in the Andaman and Nicobar Islands Port Blair (Bay of Bengal)
- Coordinates: 11°40′06″N 92°44′16″E
- Country: India
- Union Territory: Andaman and Nicobar Islands
- District: South Andaman

Government
  - Type: Municipal Council
  - Body: Port Blair Municipal Council
  - Chairman: S. Shahul Hameed (TDP)

Area
  - Total: 41.22 km^{2} (15.92 sq mi)
- Elevation: 16 m (52 ft)

Population (2011)
  - Total: 140,572
- Time zone: UTC+5.30 (IST)
- PIN: 744101
- Vehicle registration: AN-01
- Climate: Am
- Sex ratio: 1.15 (♂/♀)
- Website: pbmc.gov.in
- As per the 2011 census, Port Blair had a population of 108,058. The municipal limits were expanded from 17.74 km^{2} (6.85 sq mi) to 41.22 km^{2} (15.92 sq mi) in 2015, and the corresponding population as per the revised limits was given as 140,572 (as per the 2011 census).

Port Blair, officially named Sri Vijaya Puram (Hindi pronunciation: [ˌɕɾˈɨː ˈʋɪ̯ˌd͡ʑʌjᵊ pʊˈɾ.əm]), is the capital city of the Indian union territory of Andaman and Nicobar Islands. It is located on the South Andaman Island situated between the Bay of Bengal to the west and the Andaman Sea to the east. It is located approximately 1,190 km (740 mi) from Chennai and 1,255 km (780 mi) from Kolkata in mainland India. It is the headquarters of the South Andaman district, and the union territory's only notified town.

The town is home to the Veer Savarkar International Airport, the only major airport in the islands, and Port Blair Port, and serves as the major gateway for the islands. It is home to the air base INS Utkrosh and the naval base INS Jarawa of the Indian Navy, and the Andaman and Nicobar Command, the only integrated tri-command of the Indian Armed Forces.

The indigenous inhabitants of the region were the Andamanese. In the late 18th century, the British colonised the Andaman Islands, and established a naval base, and a penal colony, which was abandoned two years later. On 22 February 1858, the British re-established a colony at Port Blair, and a new penal colony was established on the Ross Island near Port Blair, mainly to house the prisoners of the Indian rebellion of 1857. In 1872, the Andaman and Nicobar Islands were united under a single command and administered by a chief commissioner based at Port Blair. The Cellular Jail was completed in 1906, and used to house political prisoners and independence activists. During Second World War, the Japanese captured Port Blair on 23 March 1942, and it was retaken by the British on 7 October 1945. After India became independent in 1947, the Andaman and Nicobar islands became part of the Dominion of India, and later a union territory with the capital at Port Blair.

The city was named after Archibald Blair, an officer of the Royal Indian Navy, who colonised the region in the late 18th century. On 13 September 2024, the Government of India officially renamed the city to Sri Vijaya Puram.

== History ==
The indigenous inhabitants of the region were the Andamanese, who may have been isolated from other populations during the Paleolithic era, which ended 30,000 years ago. The islands are referred to by various historians and travellers such as Ptolemy in the first century AD, Marco Polo in the 13th century, Friar Odoric in 14th century, and Cesare Federici in 16th century.

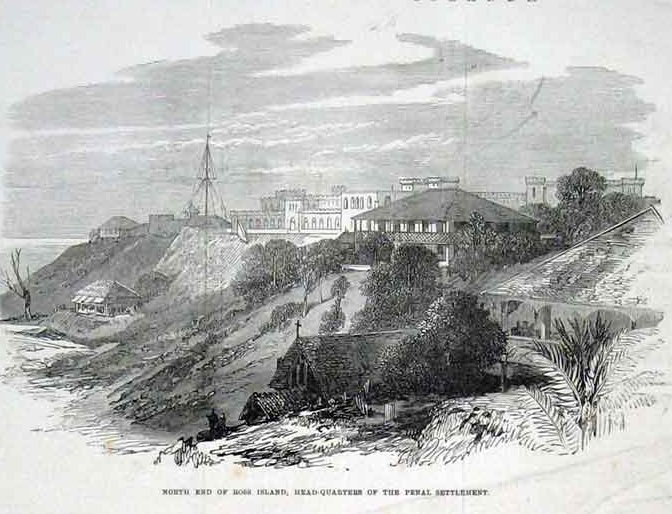
Ross Island prison (1872)

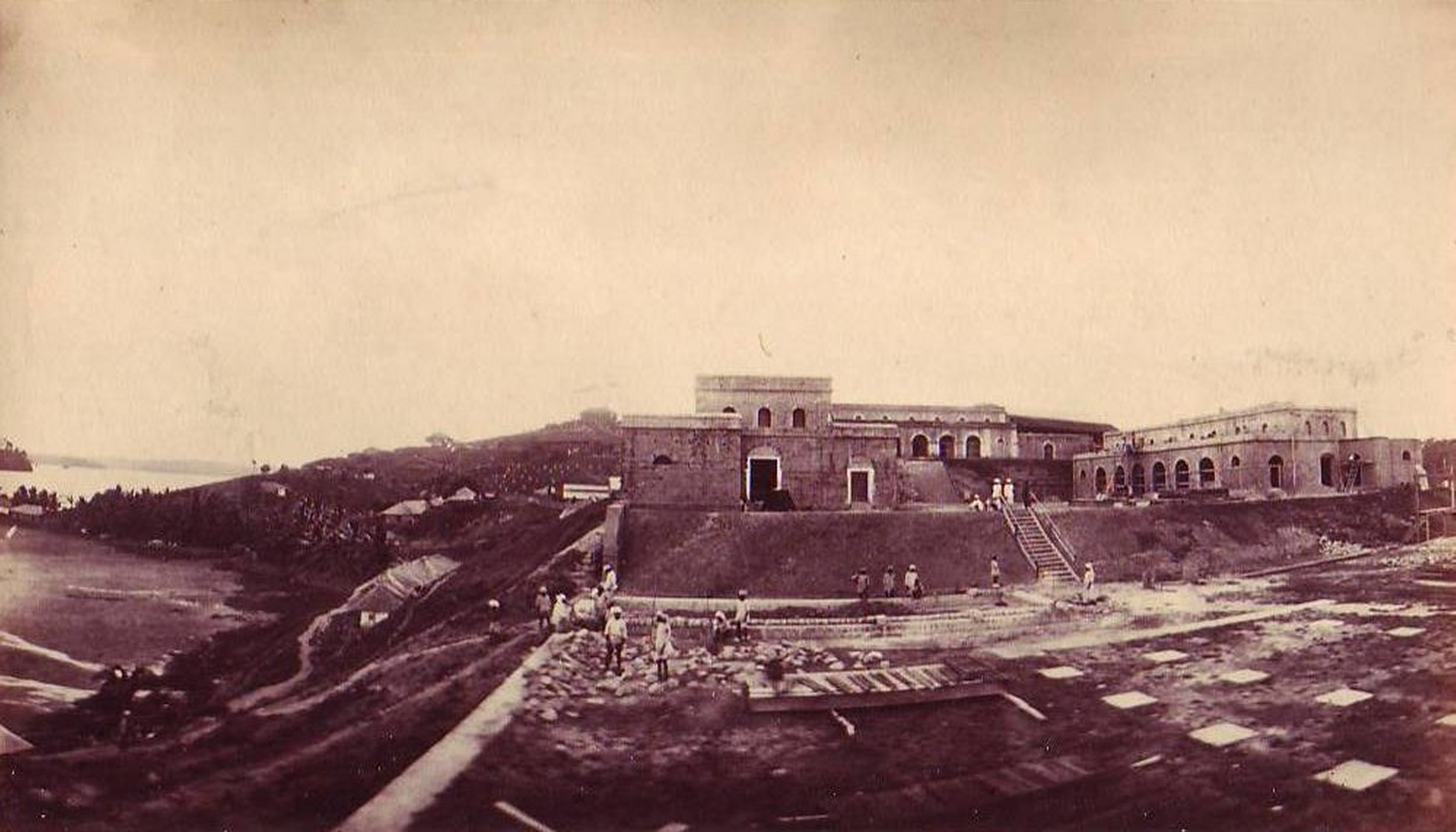
Viper Island prison under construction

In 1789, Archibald Blair of the Royal Indian Navy colonised the Andaman Islands, and established a naval base. In 1794, a penal colony was established on the Chatham island and the first batch of 100 prisoners were sent to the island. The prisoners were used for labour, and worked under a civil contract. After two years, the colony was abandoned. On 22 February 1858, the British re-established a colony at Port Blair, named after Archibald Blair. A new penal colony was established on the Ross Island near Port Blair, mainly to house the prisoners of the Indian rebellion of 1857, and the first set of 200 convicts arrived at the island in March 1858. The prisoners were used for hard labour and the clearing of forests led to frequent confrontation with the native Andamanese people. Many of the prisoners died in conflict, while some were hanged for trying to escape, apart from deaths due to disease and starvation. Between 1864 and 1867, a penal establishment was also built on the nearby Viper Island using prison labour. In 1872, the Andaman and Nicobar Islands were united under a single command and administered by a chief commissioner based out of Port Blair. The construction of the Cellular Jail started in 1896 and was completed in 1906. The jail was used to house political prisoners and independence activists away from the Indian mainland.

During Second World War, the Andaman and Nicobar islands were invaded by Japan. The Japanese captured Port Blair on 23 March 1942. Japan gave provisional control to the Azad Hind organisation of Subhash Chandra Bose on 29 December 1943. Bose had limited power while the real control of the islands remained with the Japanese, with reports of widespread looting, arson, rape, and extrajudicial killings during the Japanese occupation. On 7 October 1945, the territory was officially handed back to the British in a ceremony at the Gymkhana Ground in Port Blair.

During the Partition of India, the British announced their intention to retain possession of Port Blair and use them to resettle Anglo-Indians and Anglo-Burmese on these islands. The islands were claimed by the Indian National Congress by both India and Pakistan during the partition negotiations. After the Indian Independence in 1947, the islands became part of the Dominion of India, and as per the Constitution of India, the islands were to be administered by a lieutenant governor appointed by the Government of India. The islands became a separate union territory administered by the Government of India, following the re-organisation in 1956 with the capital at Port Blair. It has been developed into a key defence establishment since the 1980s due to its strategic location in the Bay of Bengal across the Strait of Malacca.

On 26 December 2004, the coasts of the islands experienced 10 m (33 ft) high tsunami waves following an undersea earthquake in the Indian Ocean. The locals and tourists on the islands suffered the greatest casualties while the indigenous people largely survived unscathed due to movement to high grounds. Port Blair survived sufficiently to act as a base for relief efforts in the islands. In 2017, Port Blair was selected as one of the cities to be developed as a smart city under the Smart Cities Mission. On 13 September 2024, the Government of India officially renamed the city to Sri Vijaya Puram.

== Climate ==
Port Blair has a tropical monsoon climate (Köppen climate classification Am).

Climate data for Port Blair (1991–2020, extremes 1901–present)
Month	Jan	Feb	Mar	Apr	May	Jun	Jul	Aug	Sep	Oct	Nov	Dec	Year
Record high °C (°F)	33.0 (91.4)	34.6 (94.3)	36.0 (96.8)	36.8 (98.2)	36.4 (97.5)	35.6 (96.1)	32.8 (91.0)	32.7 (90.9)	35.4 (95.7)	35.6 (96.1)	34.0 (93.2)	35.4 (95.7)	36.8 (98.2)
Mean daily maximum °C (°F)	29.9 (85.8)	30.6 (87.1)	31.7 (89.1)	32.5 (90.5)	31.5 (88.7)	30.0 (86.0)	29.6 (85.3)	29.5 (85.1)	29.5 (85.1)	30.2 (86.4)	30.5 (86.9)	30.1 (86.2)	30.5 (86.9)
Daily mean °C (°F)	26.5 (79.7)	26.9 (80.4)	27.6 (81.7)	28.7 (83.7)	28.2 (82.8)	27.2 (81.0)	27.0 (80.6)	26.9 (80.4)	26.6 (79.9)	27.0 (80.6)	27.4 (81.3)	27.0 (80.6)	27.3 (81.1)
Mean daily minimum °C (°F)	23.0 (73.4)	22.7 (72.9)	23.4 (74.1)	24.7 (76.5)	24.9 (76.8)	24.6 (76.3)	24.2 (75.6)	24.2 (75.6)	23.7 (74.7)	23.8 (74.8)	24.3 (75.7)	23.9 (75.0)	24.0 (75.2)
Record low °C (°F)	14.8 (58.6)	15.9 (60.6)	16.2 (61.2)	17.3 (63.1)	17.1 (62.8)	18.8 (65.8)	18.0 (64.4)	19.8 (67.6)	16.8 (62.2)	17.8 (64.0)	17.3 (63.1)	16.2 (61.2)	14.6 (58.3)
Average rainfall mm (inches)	48.9 (1.93)	14.2 (0.56)	32.7 (1.29)	78.0 (3.07)	407.2 (16.03)	484.2 (19.06)	448.5 (17.66)	460.2 (18.12)	505.2 (19.89)	300.9 (11.85)	221.8 (8.73)	111.4 (4.39)	3,113.4 (122.57)
Average rainy days	2.2	0.9	1.8	4.2	15.9	18.7	19.3	19.1	20.0	14.9	10.4	4.9	132.3
Average relative humidity (%) (at 17:30 IST)	75	71	72	74	83	86	86	86	89	87	82	77	81
Mean monthly sunshine hours	266.6	265.6	266.6	237.0	158.1	90.0	102.3	99.2	117.0	167.4	189.0	241.8	2,200.6
Mean daily sunshine hours	8.6	9.4	8.6	7.9	5.1	3.0	3.3	3.2	3.9	5.4	6.3	7.8	6.0
Source 1: India Meteorological Department (1971–2000)
Source 2: NOAA (extremes), Tokyo Climate Center (mean temperatures 1991–2020)

== Demographics ==
Historical population
Year	Pop.	±%
1951	7,789	—
1961	14,075	+80.7%
1971	26,218	+86.3%
1981	49,634	+89.3%
1991	74,955	+51.0%
2001	99,984	+33.4%
2011	108,058	+8.1%
Source: Government of India

As per the 2011 census, Port Blair had a population of 108,058 of which 57,761 are males while 50,297 are females. (Note: Corresponding to the old city limits prior to expansion in 2015) There were 10,699 (9.9%) children under the age of six years. The sex ratio was 871 against the territory average of 876. The literacy rate was 90.28 %, which was higher than the territory average of 86.63 %. The male literacy was 93.16% while the female literacy rate was 86.94%. Post the expansion of the city limits in 2015, the population was estimated to be 140,572 as per the 2011 census.

Tamil is the most spoken language with 40,323 native speakers, followed by Telugu (32,628), Hindi (31,520), Bengali (28,063), Malayalam (13,670), Sadri (3,479), Kurukh (3,459), and Necobarese (2,308). Hinduism was the majority religion with 74.37% adherents, with Christianity (12.43%) and Islam (12.43%) being the other religions.

== Administration ==
The Port Blair Municipal Council is the civic body administering the city of Port Blair. The council came into existence on 2 October 1957 after the Andaman & Nicobar Islands (Municipal Board's) Regulation Act was enacted on 11 March 1957. Initially covering an area of 14.14 km^{2} (5.46 sq mi) demarcated into nine wards, which were increased into 18 wards later. The first election to the municipal council was held in September 1995 and the council consisted of 18 elected and three nominated members. The city limits were expanded to 41.22 km^{2} (15.92 sq mi) in 2015. The council consists of 24 wards, each represented by a councilor elected through direct election.

== Transportation ==
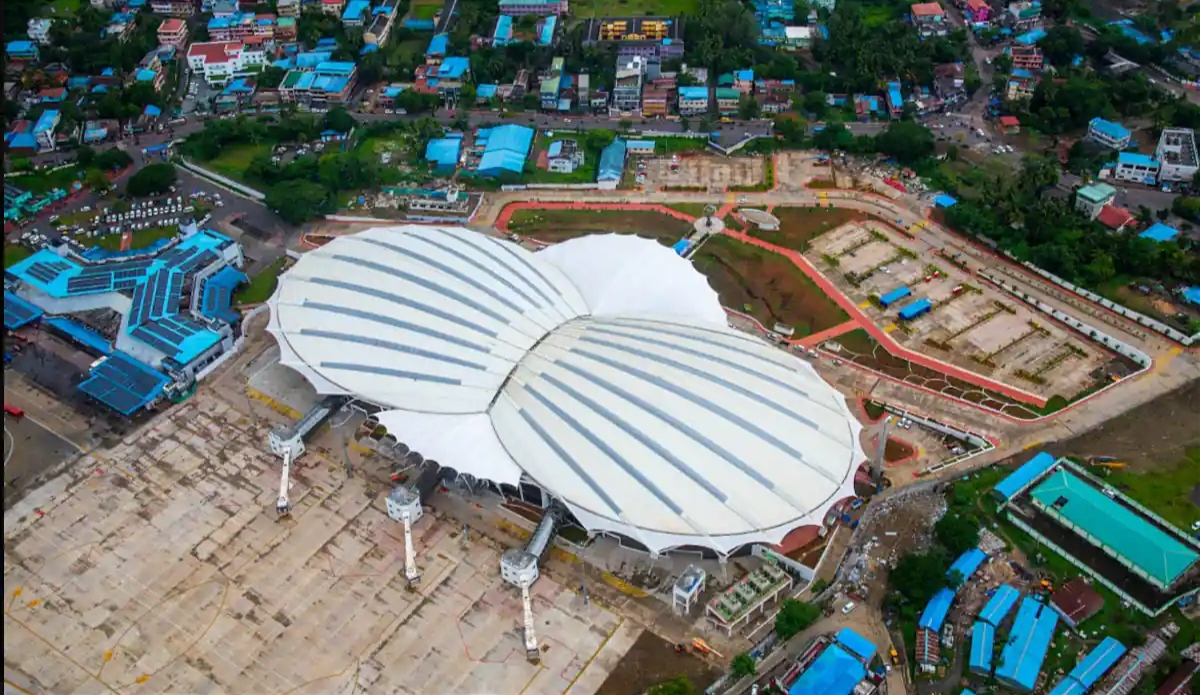
Veer Savarkar International Airport in Port Blair is the major airport in the islands

The Andaman and Nicobar islands are served by Veer Savarkar International Airport near Port Blair which has regular flights to major cities in India. The airport operates as a civil enclave, sharing airside facilities with INS Utkrosh of the Indian Navy. The airport has a single runway of 3,290 m (10,794 ft) in length, with the civilian terminal operated by the Airports Authority of India with air traffic operations managed by the Indian Navy. It is home to the Andaman and Nicobar Command, the only integrated tri-command of the Indian Armed Forces, which operates the air base of INS Utkrosh, and the nearby naval facility of INS Jarawa. The Port Blair Port is a major maritime gateway to the islands. The 230.7 km (143.4 mi) long National Highway 4 connects Port Blair and Diglipur.

== Education ==
Major educational institutions include Andaman and Nicobar Islands Institute of Medical Sciences, Andaman Law College, Dr. B. R. Ambedkar Institute of Technology, and Jawaharlal Nehru Government College.
