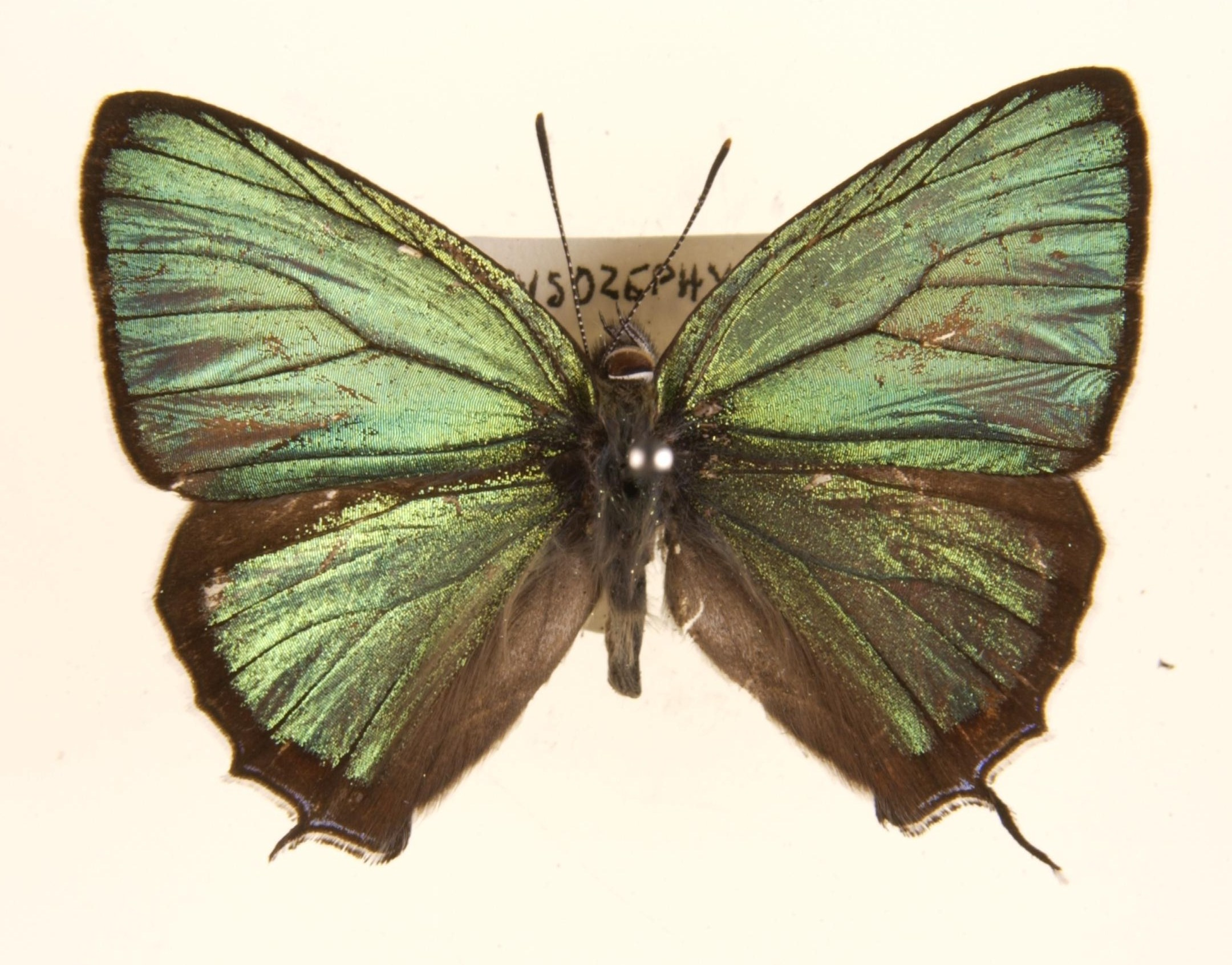
- Chrysozephyrus nishikaze Taiwan

Scientific classification
- Kingdom: Animalia
- Phylum: Arthropoda
- Clade: Pancrustacea
- Class: Insecta
- Order: Lepidoptera
- Family: Lycaenidae
- Tribe: Theclini
- Genus: Chrysozephyrus; Shirôzu & Yamamoto, 1956

Species
- Numerous, see text

= Chrysozephyrus =

Genus of butterflies

Chrysozephyrus is a butterfly genus in the family Lycaenidae. They were formerly included in Thecla. The genus is diverse and ranges from Russia to northern India.

== Selected species ==
- Chrysozephyrus birupa – fawn hairstreak
- Chrysozephyrus brillantinus
- Chrysozephyrus disparatus
  - Chrysozephyrus disparatus pseudotaiwanus (Howarth, 1957)
- Chrysozephyrus duma – metallic green hairstreak
- Chrysozephyrus esakii (Sonan, 1940)
- Chrysozephyrus jakamensis – jakama hairstreak
- Chrysozephyrus kabrua – Kabru hairstreak
  - Chrysozephyrus kabrua niitakanus (Kano, 1928)
- Chrysozephyrus khasia – tailless metallic green hairstreak
- Chrysozephyrus kirbariensis – Kirbari hairstreak
- Chrysozephyrus kuromon (Sugiyama, 1994)
- Chrysozephyrus mushaellus (Matsumura, 1938)
- Chrysozephyrus nishikaze (Araki & Sibatani, 1886)
- Chrysozephyrus paona – Paona hairstreak
- Chrysozephyrus rarasanus (Matsumura, 1939)
- Chrysozephyrus smaragdinus
- Chrysozephyrus splendidulus Murayama, 1965
- Chrysozephyrus surioia – cerulean hairstreak
- Chrysozephyrus syla – silver hairstreak
- Chrysozephyrus vittata – Tytler's hairstreak
- Chrysozephyrus yuchingkinus Murayama & Shimonoya, 1965
- Chrysozephyrus zoa – powdered green hairstreak
- Chrysozephyrus tytleri (Howarth, 1957) Manipur (Mt. Kabru), Vietnam
