= Tytler =

Tytler is a surname of Scottish origin. Notable people with the surname include:

- Alexander Fraser Tytler, Lord Woodhouselee (1747–1813), Scottish lawyer and writer
- Harriet Tytler (1828 – 1907), British artist, writer, and pioneer photographer.
- Harry Christopher Tytler (1868–1938), British soldier and entomologist
- Jagdish Tytler (born 1944), Indian politician
- James Tytler (born 1745), Scottish aeronaut
- J. D. Tytler (James Douglas Tytler) (1902-1973), Scottish-born Indian educationist
- Patrick Fraser Tytler (1791–1849), Scottish historian
- Robert Christopher Tytler (1818–1872), British soldier, naturalist and photographer
