= Ross Island Penal Colony =

Former Andaman Islands convict settlement

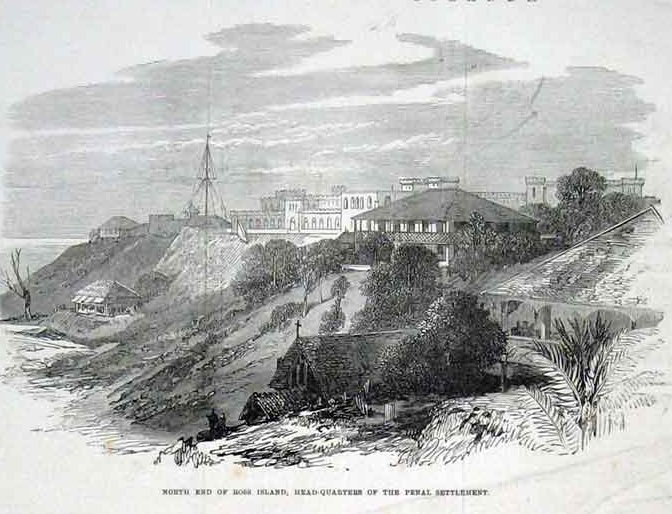
The Ross Island Prison Headquarters, 1872

Ross Island Penal Colony was a convict settlement that was established in 1858 in the remote Andaman Islands by the British colonial government in India, primarily to jail a large number of prisoners from the Indian Rebellion of 1857, also known as the Indian Mutiny. With the establishment of the penal colony at Ross Island, the British administration made it the administrative headquarters for the entire group of Andaman and Nicobar Islands and built bungalows and other facilities on the site. This colony was meant as "manageable models of colonial governance and rehabilitation". The Chief Commissioner's residence was located at the highest point on the island. Over time, several other islands including Chatham and Viper were used for the penal colony.

The penal colony became infamous as "Kalapani" or "black water" for the brutalities inflicted by the British authorities on the political prisoners from India, and most of whom had died by 1860 due to illness and torture suffered during the initial stages of the clearance of the forest to establish the colony. In later years the colony experimented for a short time with civilizing the indigenous people of Andamans. The penal colony was used as an experimental station for various methods of torture and medical tests During World War II, the island was invaded by the Japanese army, forcing the British to evacuate. The administrative buildings were destroyed but the penal colony remained. After the Allied forces reoccupied the island the penal colony was disbanded on 7 October 1945.

== Geography ==
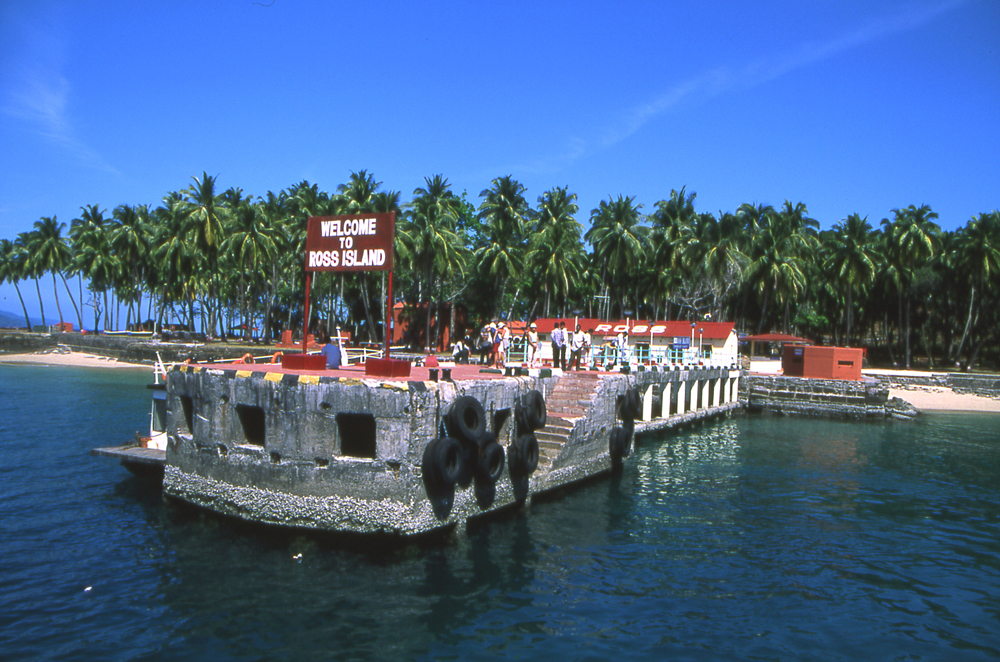
Ross Island in 2004

Ross Island (now known as Netaji Subhash Chandra Bose Island), one of the islands chosen for establishing the penal colony, is located near the entrance to the harbour at Port Blair in South Andamans. It is a small island which has a circumference of one mile (1.6 km) only. The penal colonies were initially located on Ross, Chatham and Viper Islands. Viper Island was meant for the most dangerous prisoners. By 1871, it included Perseverance Point, Hopetown, Command Point, Mount Harriet, South Point, Aberdeen, Haddo, Navy Bay and Port Mouat, twelve stations in all. Once called "Paris of the East" for its exciting social life and tropical forests, the island was devastated by the invading army of the Japanese and also by an earthquake which had struck the island in 1941, and it now appears more like a "jungle-clad Lost City."

== History ==
The earliest known effort to establish a penal colony was by Archibald Blair who found the remoteness of the island as ideal for such a colony. But his initiative failed to go beyond 1796 as malaria prevented it. The First War of Indian Independence in 1857 rekindled the interest of the British Administration in India to establish a penal colony in the Andaman Islands for political prisoners.

The first group of 200 prisoners were transported under the control of Dr James Pattison Walker from Calcutta. Deportees included many prominent leaders of the Wahabi movement (an Islamic "reform movement") and the subsequent revolution. The prisoners landed at the Andaman Islands on 10 March 1858. Walker soon put the convicts on the arduous task of clearing the dense forest of Ross Island, building their own shelters and other buildings, and laying roads. The prisoners were chained and collared around the neck with identity tags, and were in a poor state of health. In the beginning there were no basic amenities. During the rainy season they had to live in tents. In November 1858 temporary barrack-type huts with walls made of mats and with leaking thatched roofs provided accommodation for about 1,000 prisoners.

At one stage, of the 8,000 prisoners who had been transported to the islands under the penal project, 3,500 had died due to sickness. Sir Robert Napier, who came to Port Blair to investigate, found the conditions "beyond comprehension" as there was no food, clothing and shelter provided to the convicts. However, Ross Island was comparatively a better place than in the earlier initial years as Colonel RC Tytler and his wife Harriet had improved the facilities for the community. Tytler had been posted as Superintendent of the Convict Settlement, also known as the "British gulag", from April 1862 to February 1864. He tried to improve the conditions at the camp, where the death rate of the prisoners was 700 per year. At that time the doctors at the camp reported that only 45 prisoners out of the 10,000 were considered medically fit.

According to reports in the 1870s, intense rain, malaria, pneumonia and dysentery caused many deaths. During this time the authorities also embarked on testing of pharmaceutical drugs like quinine (cinchona alkaloid) by forcibly feeding it to 10,000 prisoners which resulted in severe side effects such as nausea, diarrhea and depression; as result the prisoners started injuring each other so that authorities would hang them. Instead, a new system of "flogging and a reduced diet" was introduced and they were made to sleep in a kind of "trellis-work cage". The prisoners also faced hardships from the indigenous tribes, who tortured and killed them while working in the field, and also attacked the colony.

In 1891, there were 12,197 convicts who had been exported from British India. Some of the convicts who were freed were engaged in agriculture, and those who were forced to do service were given monetary compensation of US$25 per month. However, even then escape from the penal colony was impossible and any escapee who tried was killed.

At the beginning of World War I in 1914, Dr. Robert Heindl of Germany had noted that the 15,000 political prisoners at the penal colony could create an undesirable revolution and therefore their release in one stage, following capture of the island by a German ship by bombardment, was risky. He suggested that after due care and adequate security had been put in place the convicts of the penal colony could be shifted to the mainland in small boats.

From the time of its establishment in 1858 till it was disbanded on 7 October 1945, the penal colony was administered by 24 Chief Commissioners. This deserted fortress is now a tourist attraction.

== Notable events ==
Four days after their first landing on the island, one of the convicts, Narain, who had been convicted for sedition, tried to escape but was caught and shot dead. Another prisoner, Naringun Singh, who was a deserter, committed suicide by hanging. When 81 out of the 288 inmates tried to escape they were savagely attacked by the aboriginal people of Andamans which made them turn back to the prison camp seeking medical help. However, all of them were summarily put to death by hanging in one single day. JP Grant, President in Council in Calcutta complained to the higher authorities, but Walker was not reprimanded; instead, he put the convicts at the Penal Colony into an "iron collar" to prevent them from escape. Finally, on 3 October 1859 he was removed from the penal settlement as he had suggested branding the convicts on their forearms with information of the crime and sentence that they had been given.

On 23 April 1858, out of the 91 escapees one person who was saved by the Andamanese people was Dudnath Tiwari, a political prisoner. He was absorbed into the aboriginal culture, married two of their girls, and learned their language. However, when the Andamanese were on the verge of mounting a massive attack on the penal colony on 16 May 1859, he ran away and secretly conveyed this information to the Superintendent. The aboriginals attacked the camp with bows and arrows but were completely routed by the superior weapons of the British. This battle came to be known as the "Battle of Aberdeen", the first initiative by the local tribals who did not like the British officers or the convicts. This resulted in change of approach by the British to handle the local people: steps were initiated to seek peace with them and a British officer was appointed to look after their welfare.

A notable incident that occurred was the assassination of Lord Mayo, the Viceroy of India who had visited the islands on an inspection tour. He had visited the Ross Island penal settlement. The attack on Lord Mayo was carried out by Sher Ali, one of the convicts of the penal colony who was on a sick leave; the assassination was carried out while Mayo was returning after a pleasant trip to Mount Harriet on the evening of 8 February 1872. Another political prisoner who suffered the longest period of 47 years of incarceration was Musai Singh who was released for good behavior in July 1907 on the occasion of the 50th anniversary of India's First War of Independence in 1857.

Fazal Haq Khairabadi, a renowned poet and intellectual in the Mughal court, a friend of Urdu poet Ghalib and a mentor of David Ochterlony, was accused of inflaming the Muslims of Delhi to wage "jihad" against the British Raj during the First War of Independence. He refused to plead not guilty and seek amnesty, and was thus transported to the penal colony. He was at the penal colony from 8 October 1859 till his death in 1861. His son made efforts to have his father released but could only take part in his father's funeral at Port Blair. One of the notable actions Khairabadi did while in the penal colony was to write on the details of the First War of Independence and his experience of the "Kalapani", using charcoal sticks and rags of cloth; these were later published in Arabic as Al-Surat-ul Hindia and Al-Fitnat-ul-Hindia.

Ross Island Penal Colony was the inspiration for Rura Penthe, the penal colony island in the 1954 Disney film 20,000 Leagues Under the Sea.

== See also ==
- Cellular Jail

== Bibliography ==
- Dalrymple, William (17 August 2009). The Last Mughal: The Fall of Delhi, 1857. A&C Black. ISBN 978-1-4088-0688-3.
- Guides, Rough (20 January 2011). The Rough Guide to India. Rough Guides. ISBN 978-1-4053-8849-8.
- Lamba, Abha Narain (1 September 2002). India. DK Pub. ISBN 978-0-7894-8395-9.
- Lochner, R. K. (1 January 2002). The Last Gentleman-of-war: The Raider Exploits of the Cruiser Emden. Naval Institute Press. ISBN 978-1-55750-538-5.
- Out, Time (2010). Time Out India: Perfect Places to Stay, Eat and Explore. Time Out Guides. ISBN 978-1-84670-164-1.
- Sen, Satadru (2012). Disciplined Natives: Race, Freedom and Confinement in Colonial India. Primus Books. ISBN 978-93-80607-31-3.
- Wheeler, Edward Jewitt; Funk, Isaac Kaufman; Woods, William Seaver; Draper, Arthur Stimson; Funk, Wilfred John (1894). The Literary Digest. Funk and Wagnalls.
