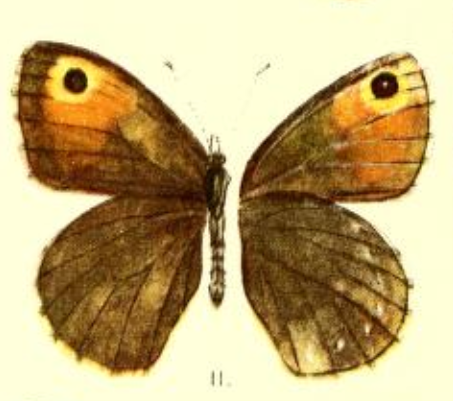

Scientific classification
- Kingdom: Animalia
- Phylum: Arthropoda
- Clade: Pancrustacea
- Class: Insecta
- Order: Lepidoptera
- Family: Nymphalidae
- Genus: Paralasa
- Species: P. yasina

Binomial name
- Paralasa yasina Tytler, 1926

= Paralasa yasina =

Species of butterfly

Paralasa yasina, the Yasin argus, is a butterfly in the family Nymphalidae. It is found in Kashmir and Ladakh. It was described by Harry Christopher Tytler in 1926. This species is monotypic.

== Description ==
The apex of the forewing is pointed and is not rounded. The wingspan is 50 millimeters.

The male differs from Paralasa mani by having the apical fulvous patch on the upperside forewing reduced in size. The male underside is similar to Paralasa mani.

The female is similar to the male but the basal two-thirds of the forewing are yellow and the apical third is pale yellow.

It has only been recorded from Yasin Valley in Gilgit-Baltistan and nearby regions in Ladakh.
