= Anthony Sattin =

Anthony Sattin FRGS (born 28 June 1956) is a British journalist, broadcaster and travel writer. His main areas of interest is the Middle East and Africa, particularly Egypt, and he has lived and travelled extensively in these regions.

== Education ==
Sattin completed a literature degree at the University of Warwick and an MA in creative writing at the University of East Anglia.

== Writing ==
Sattin's book A Winter on the Nile: Florence Nightingale, Gustave Flaubert and the Temptations of Egypt, a collection of Florence Nightingale's previously-unpublished letters, was described in The Literary Review as "a triumph of the historical imagination" and in The Independent as "some of the best writing of the year".

The Lonely Planet Guide A House Somewhere: Tales of Life Abroad, to which Sattin contributed, has been used as a set text for teaching English A-level.

Sattin has been a long-time regular contributor to the Sunday Times travel and books pages and to Conde Nast Traveller. His work has appeared in a number of other international publication, including The Spectator, The Daily Telegraph, the Independent and the Guardian. He sits on the editorial advisory board of Geographical magazine and has contributed to several guidebook series, including the Lonely Planet volumes on Egypt and Algeria.

Giles Foden, writing in the Conde Nast Traveller magazine, has described Sattin as one of the ten key influences in modern travel writing. Sattin has taught writing classes for UEA Guardian Masterclasses and the How To Academy.

== Broadcasting ==
Sattin presented the BBC television series The Tourist and The Thirties in Colour, and a number of documentaries for radio including Buying a Culture in Abu Dhabi and Travels Round My House on BBC Radio 3 and Crazy for Love: Layla and the Mad Poet on Radio 4.

== Books ==
- 1986 An Englishwoman in India: The Memoirs of Harriet Tytler 1828-1858 (editor) ISBN 978-0192122445
- 1989 Shooting the Breeze ISBN 978-0224027243
- 2000 The Pharaoh's Shadow: Travels in Ancient and Modern Egypt ISBN 978-0575063976
- 2000 Florence Nightingale's Letters from Egypt: A Journey on the Nile, 1849-1850 (editor) ISBN 978-0802115324
- 2003 The Gates of Africa: Death, Discovery and the Search for Timbuktu ISBN 978-0007122332
- 2010 A Winter on the Nile: Florence Nightingale, Gustave Flaubert and the Temptations of Egypt ISBN 978-0091926069
- 2011 Lifting the Veil: Two Centuries of Travellers, Traders and Tourists in Egypt ISBN 978-1848857698
- 2015 The Young Lawrence: a Portrait of the Legend as a Young Man ISBN 978-0393242669
- 2022 Nomads: The Wanderers Who Shaped Our World ISBN 978-1473677791
