= Dudhnath Tewari =

Indian convict (fl. 1857–1866)

Dudhnath Tewari (or Tewari, or Doodnath Tewarry) (fl. 1857–1866) was a sepoy of the 14th Regiment of Native Infantry convicted (number 276) for participating in the 1857 Sepoy mutiny.

He was convicted of mutiny and desertion during the rebellion. He was sent to the Ross Island Penal Colony at Port Blair in the Andamans on 8 April 1858. Along with 90 others he escaped and lived with Andamanese tribes for about a year.

Accounts of his life among the tribes, though coloured by personal prejudice and apparent embellishments, were widely publicized during his time. Among the tribes, he learned of a tribal uprising planned against the British at the penal settlement, leading him to return and reveal the plans. The penal settlement officers prepared for what became known as the Battle of Aberdeen, in which the locals were defeated. For his actions, Tewari was pardoned.

The escapees made rafts from felled trees, tying them with tent ropes. A fellow prisoner, Aga, claimed that the opposite shore was 10 days of walking from the capital. All earlier prisoners who had attempted an escape had either returned to the penal settlement after days lost in the jungle without food or had been killed by tribals. Tewari was the sole survivor of this escape attempt. He submitted a report of his travels to Dr. J.P. Walker, the prison superintendent. His statements recounted his escape and life among the tribals. He claimed that the escapees had met up with other escapees and nearly 130 convicts walked through the jungle for eight days without food. They found fruit and obtained water from freshwater springs and creeping canes. Twelve people fell behind to die of hunger and thirst. They avoided natives, but found abandoned dwellings.

On the fourteenth day, they were surrounded by 100 aborigines armed with bows and arrows. Attempts to signal surrender failed, and many escapees were killed. Tewari escaped with arrow wounds on his eyebrow, elbow, and shoulder, along with Shoo Dull and another convict (member of the Kurmi caste) . The next day, they were detected by tribals who shot at them, killing two and wounding Tewari, who feigned death. He was dragged out and shot at; he again feigned death and then attempted to remove the arrows.

The tribals took him in their boat and applied soil to his wounds. They took him to Turmooglee island. His wounds healed and he adopted tribal customs, living naked with a shaved head. The tribals looked upon him with suspicion and never let him use a bow and arrow. They did not make him work. After about four months, Pooteah, an elder, bequeathed his daughter Leepa, aged 20, and another girl, Jigah, aged 16, to him as wives. Tewari claimed that the aboriginals had no idea of a god, and that he had been given five wives. Babies were reared and suckled by any nursing mothers in the tribe. After spending one year and 24 days, he returned to the convict settlement to warn them of an impending attack. F.J. Mouat stated that Tewari's account was exaggerated and compared him with Munchausen. Edward Horace Man also considered Tewari's accounts to have been exaggerated.

Maurice Vidal Portman reported that the tribe that Tewari lived with was the Aka-Bea-da. Tewari was subsequently pardoned and released. The Government order read:

In consideration of the behaviour of Life Convict Dudhnath Tewari, who, after being with the aborigines of the Andaman Islands for upwards of a year, returned to give warning of an attack which they had planned to make upon the station at Aberdeen, at Atalanta Point, the Governor General in Council is pleased to comply with your recommendation in his favour, and to grant him a free pardon. He should be released and sent up to Calcutta by the first opportunity.

In 1866, Tewari was taken to Port Blair by Jeremiah Homfray, who headed the Andaman Home. Several inmates at the Andaman Home recognized Tewari. The women abused and berated Tewari for having abandoned his pregnant wife Leepa.
