= Chrysozephyrus suroia =

Cerulean hairstreak

Scientific classification
- Kingdom: Animalia
- Phylum: Arthropoda
- Clade: Pancrustacea
- Class: Insecta
- Order: Lepidoptera
- Family: Lycaenidae
- Genus: Chrysozephyrus
- Species: C. suroia

Binomial name
- Chrysozephyrus suroia (Tytler, 1915)

Species of butterfly

Chrysozephyrus suroia, the cerulean hairstreak, is a small butterfly found in India that belongs to the lycaenids or blues family.

== Taxonomy ==
The butterfly was previously classified as Thecla suroia Doubleday.

== Range ==
The butterfly occurs in India from Assam to Manipur and in the Kachin Hills of Myanmar.

== See also ==
- List of butterflies of India (Lycaenidae)
