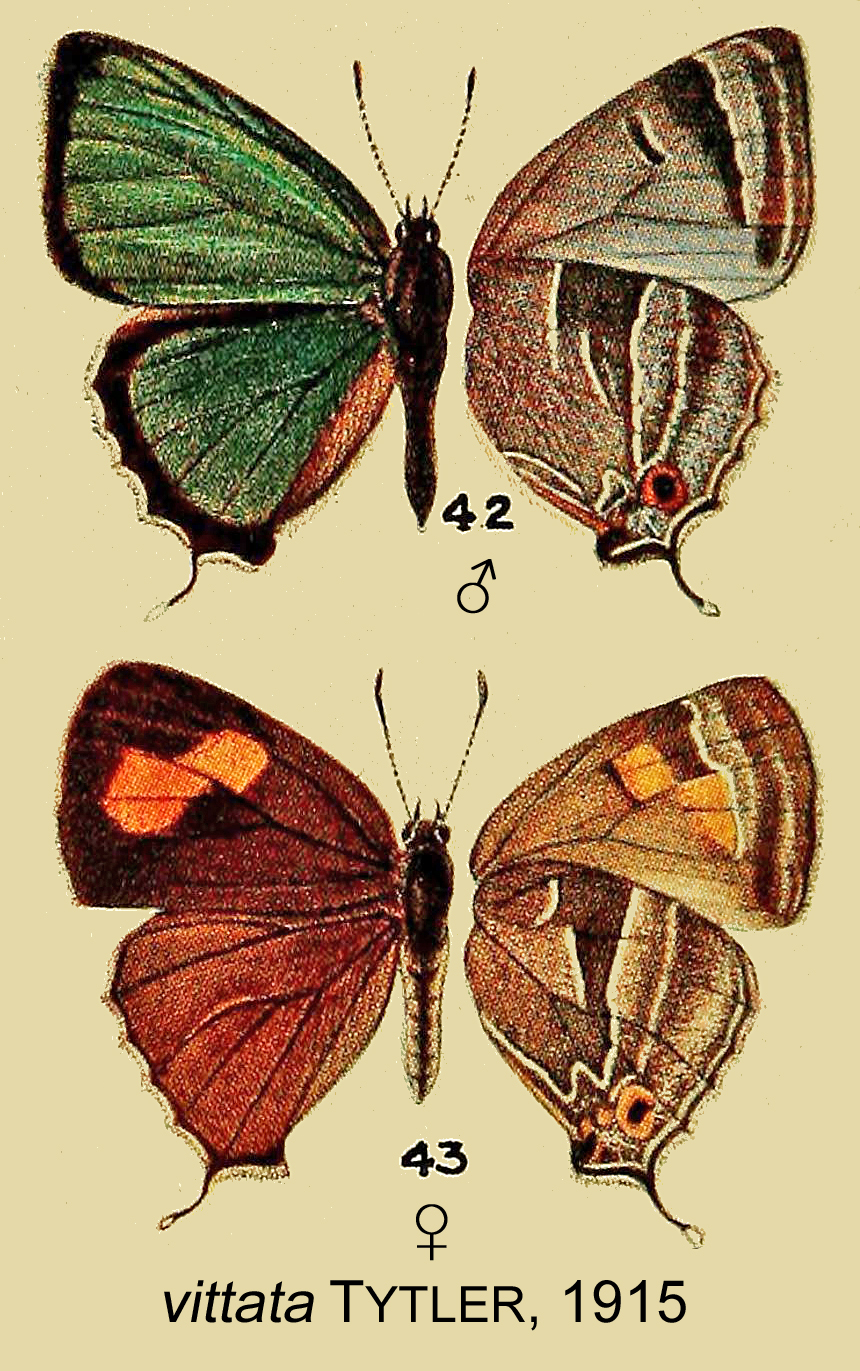

Scientific classification
- Kingdom: Animalia
- Phylum: Arthropoda
- Class: Insecta
- Order: Lepidoptera
- Family: Lycaenidae
- Genus: Chrysozephyrus
- Species: C. vittatus

Binomial name
- Chrysozephyrus vittatus (Tytler, 1915)

= Chrysozephyrus vittatus =

Tytler's hairstreak

Species of butterfly

Chrysozephyrus vittatus, the Tytler's hairstreak, is a small butterfly found in India that belongs to the lycaenids or blues family.

== Taxonomy ==
The butterfly was previously classified as Thecla vittata Tytler.

== Range ==
The butterfly occurs in India in Assam, Manipur and Nagaland, and beyond in Laos, northern Vietnam and western China.
