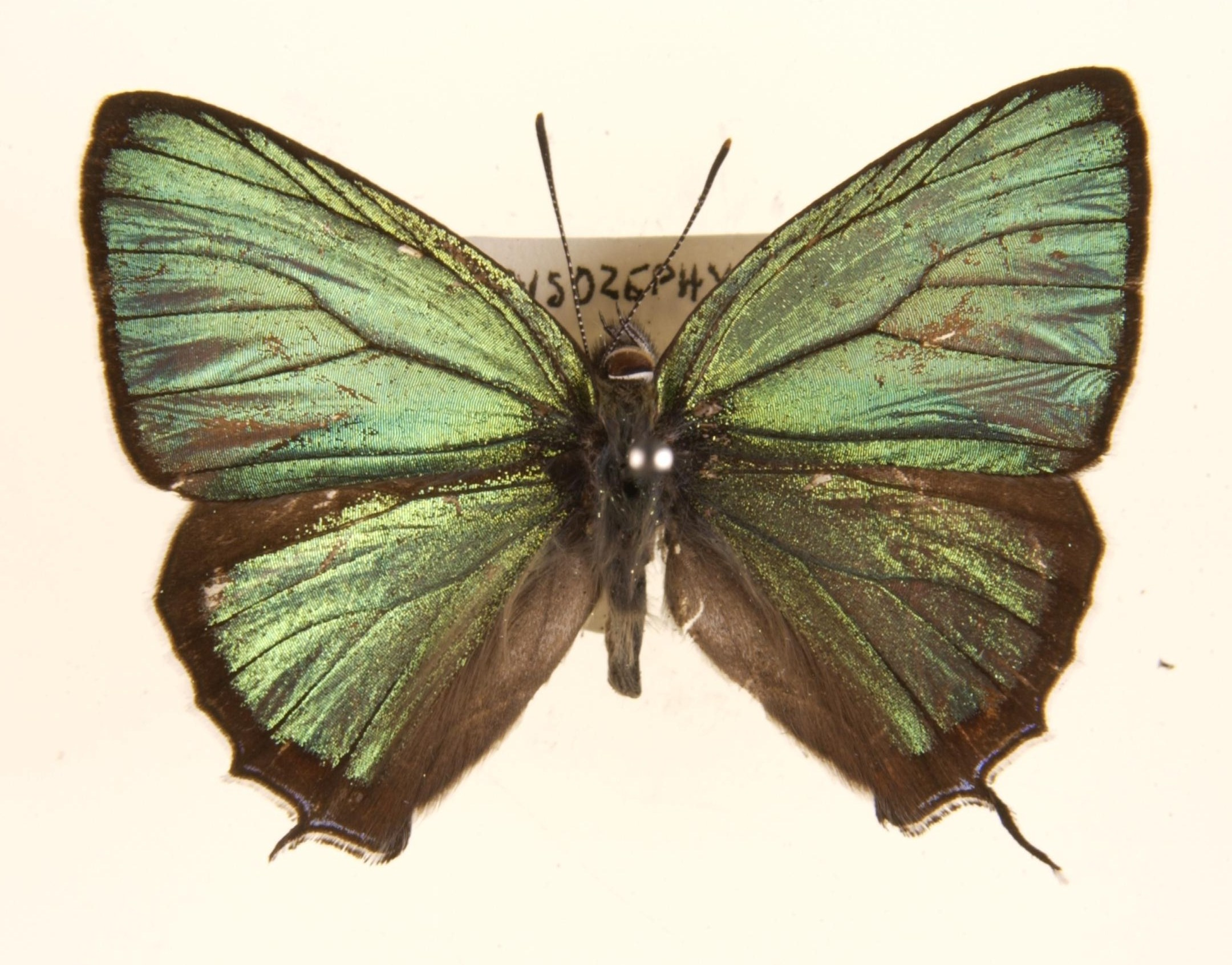
- Male, upperside

Scientific classification
- Kingdom: Animalia
- Phylum: Arthropoda
- Class: Insecta
- Order: Lepidoptera
- Family: Lycaenidae
- Genus: Chrysozephyrus
- Species: C. nishikaze

Binomial name
- Chrysozephyrus nishikaze (Araki & Sibatani, 1941)

Synonyms
- Thecla nishikaze Araki & Sibatani, 1941; Neozephyrus nishikaze (Araki & Sibatani, 1941)

= Chrysozephyrus nishikaze =

Species of butterfly

Chrysozephyrus nishikaze is a small butterfly in the family Lycaenidae. It is endemic to Taiwan. It lives on mountains. The larvae feed on Prunus campanulata.
