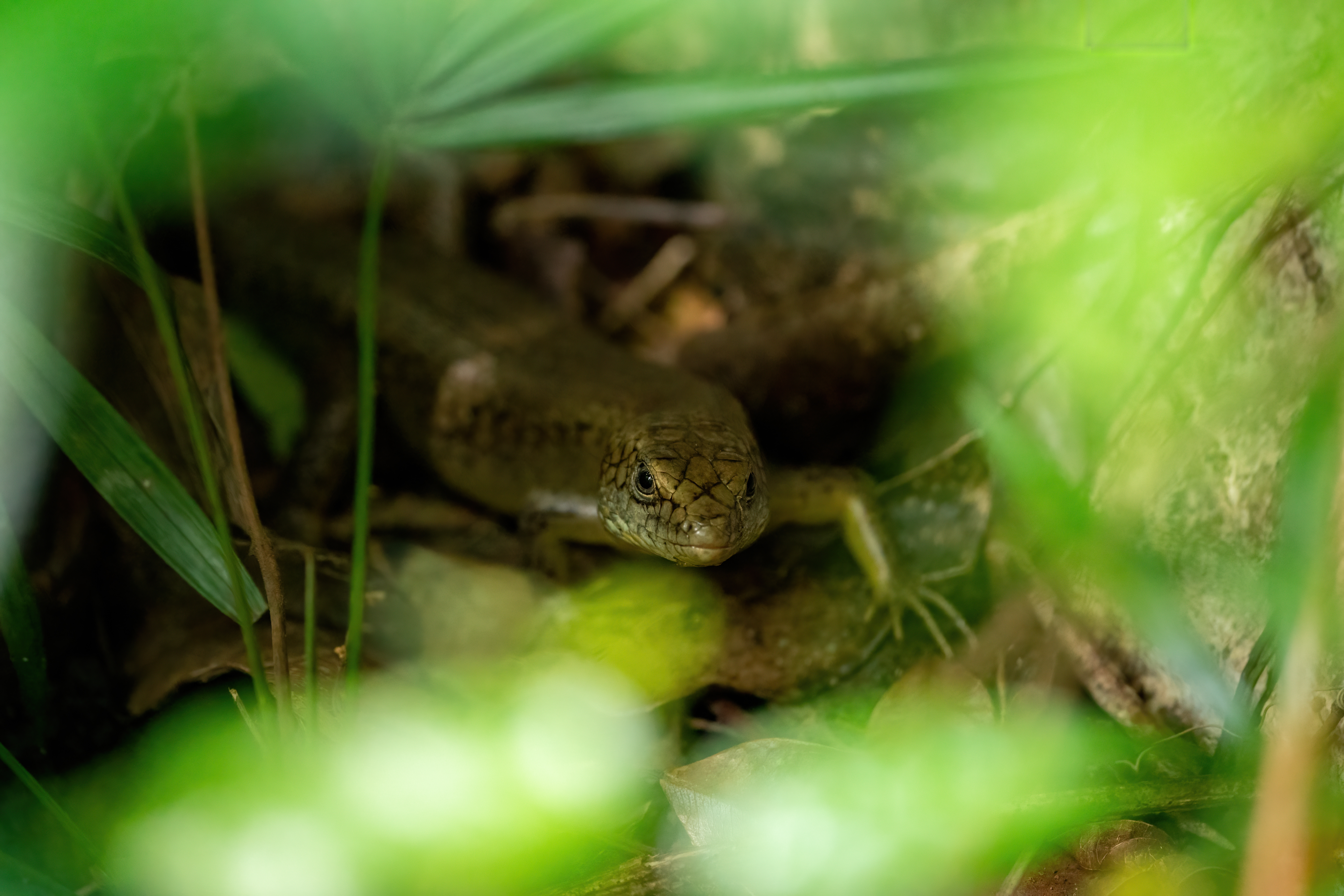
- Near Shoalbay, Andaman Islands

Conservation status
- Least Concern (IUCN 3.1)

Scientific classification
- Kingdom: Animalia
- Phylum: Chordata
- Class: Reptilia
- Order: Squamata
- Family: Scincidae
- Genus: Eutropis
- Species: E. tytleri

Binomial name
- Eutropis tytleri (Theobald, 1868)

Synonyms
- Scincus tytleri Theobald, 1868; Mabuia tytleri — Boulenger, 1887; Mabuya tytleri — M.A. Smith, 1935; Eutropis tytleri — Mausfeld & Schmitz, 2003

= Eutropis tytleri =

Species of lizard

Eutropis tytleri (common name: Tytler's mabuya) is a species of skink, a lizard in the family Scincidae. The species is endemic to the Andaman Islands, India.

== Etymology and Taxonomy ==
E. tytleri is named after British naturalist Robert Christopher Tytler, who probably collected the type. It was described by the British naturalist William Theobald in 1868, who was employed by the Geological Survey of India at the time.

== Habitat ==
The preferred natural habitat of E. tytleri is forests, at altitudes from sea level to 150 m (490 ft). It can be found in native broadleaf forests, agricultural fields, coconut plantations, and around human dwellings and gardens.

== Description ==
A large species of skink, E. tytleri may attain a snout-to-vent length (SVL) of 15 cm (5.9 in). The tail is long, from 1.5 to 2.2 times SVL. Dorsally, it is bronzish brown. Ventrally, it is light yellow. E. tytleri is thought to be the largest extant skink species native to the Indian subcontinent.

== Behavior ==
E. tytleri is crepuscular. It has been observed climbing tree trunks to a height of 3 m (9.8 ft), and is also active on the ground.

== Diet ==
E. tytleri preys upon insects, frogs, and small reptiles.

== Reproduction ==
The mode of reproduction of E. tytleri is unknown.

== Relationship with humans ==
While the forests to which E. tytleri lives appear to be shrinking as human use of its habitat increases, this species population does not appear to be in decline. E. tytleri appears able to adapt to new, human-created habitats and is known to inhabit many human-used spaces. Furthermore, this skink is not known to be utilized by people and does not appear to be under any specific threat.

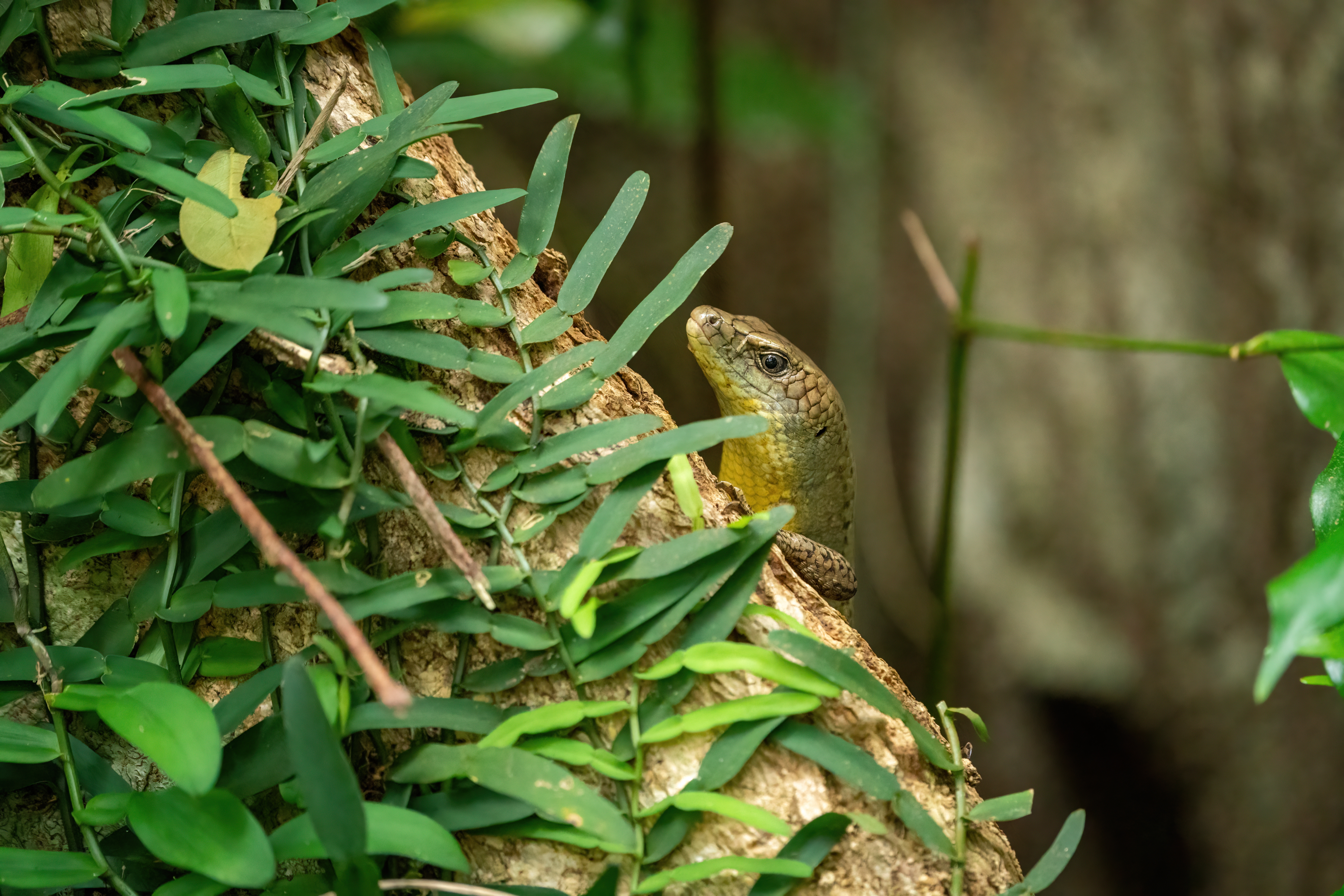
