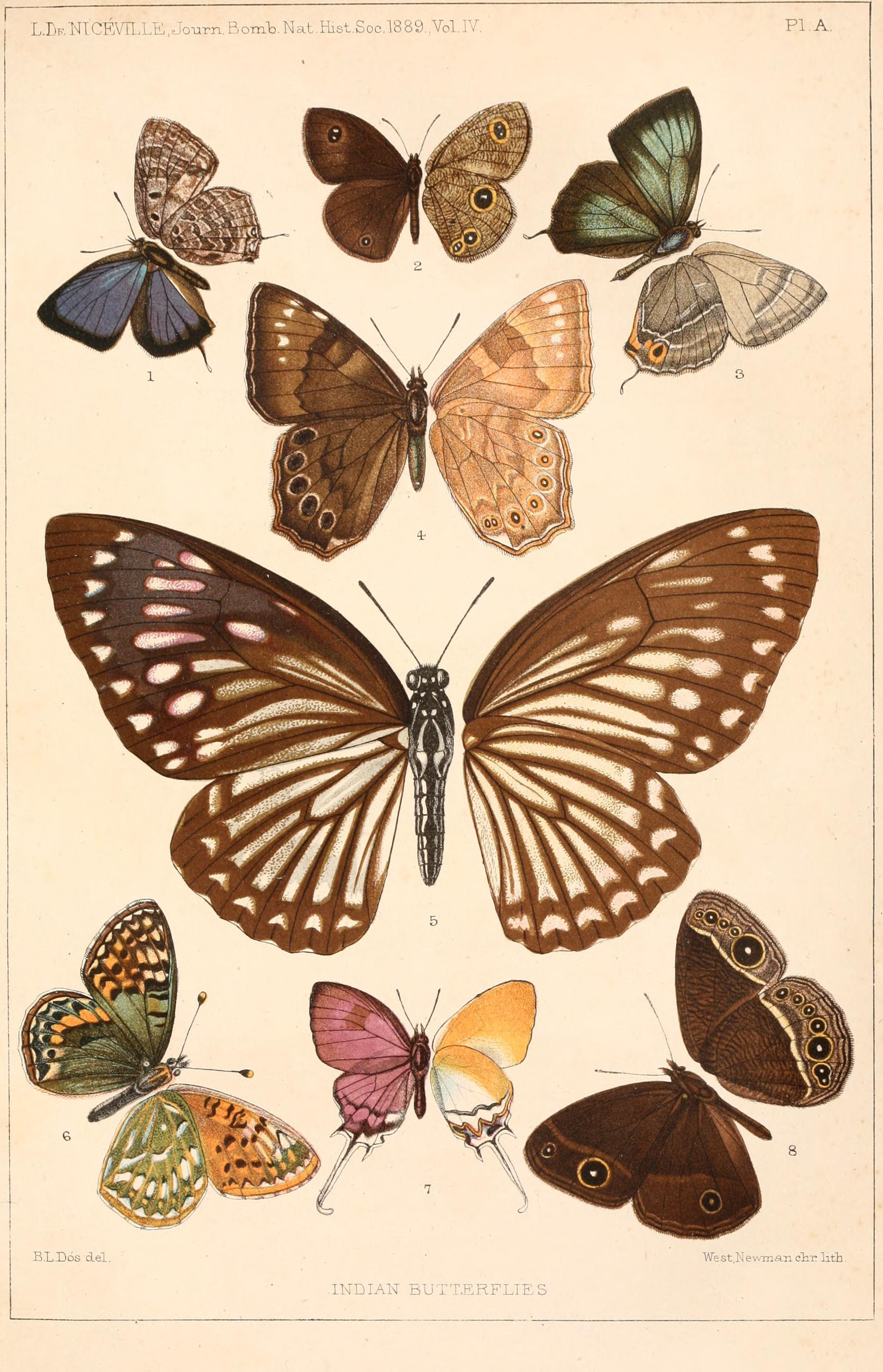
- plate accompanying the original description as Zephyrus zoa Fig. 3.

Scientific classification
- Domain: Eukaryota
- Kingdom: Animalia
- Phylum: Arthropoda
- Class: Insecta
- Order: Lepidoptera
- Family: Lycaenidae
- Genus: Chrysozephyrus
- Species: C. zoa

Binomial name
- Chrysozephyrus zoa (de Nicéville, 1889)

= Chrysozephyrus zoa =

Powdered green hairstreak

Species of butterfly

Chrysozephyrus zoa, the powdered green hairstreak, is a small butterfly found in India that belongs to the lycaenids or blues family.

== Taxonomy ==
The butterfly was previously classified as Thecla zoa de Nicéville.

== Range ==
The butterfly occurs in India from Sikkim to Manipur.

== See also ==
- List of butterflies of India (Lycaenidae)
