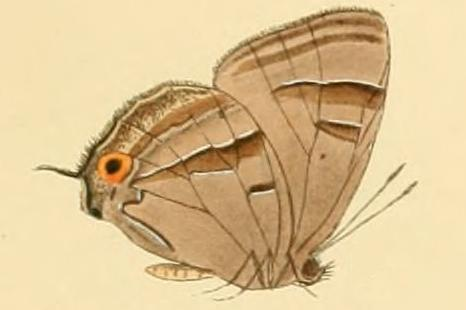

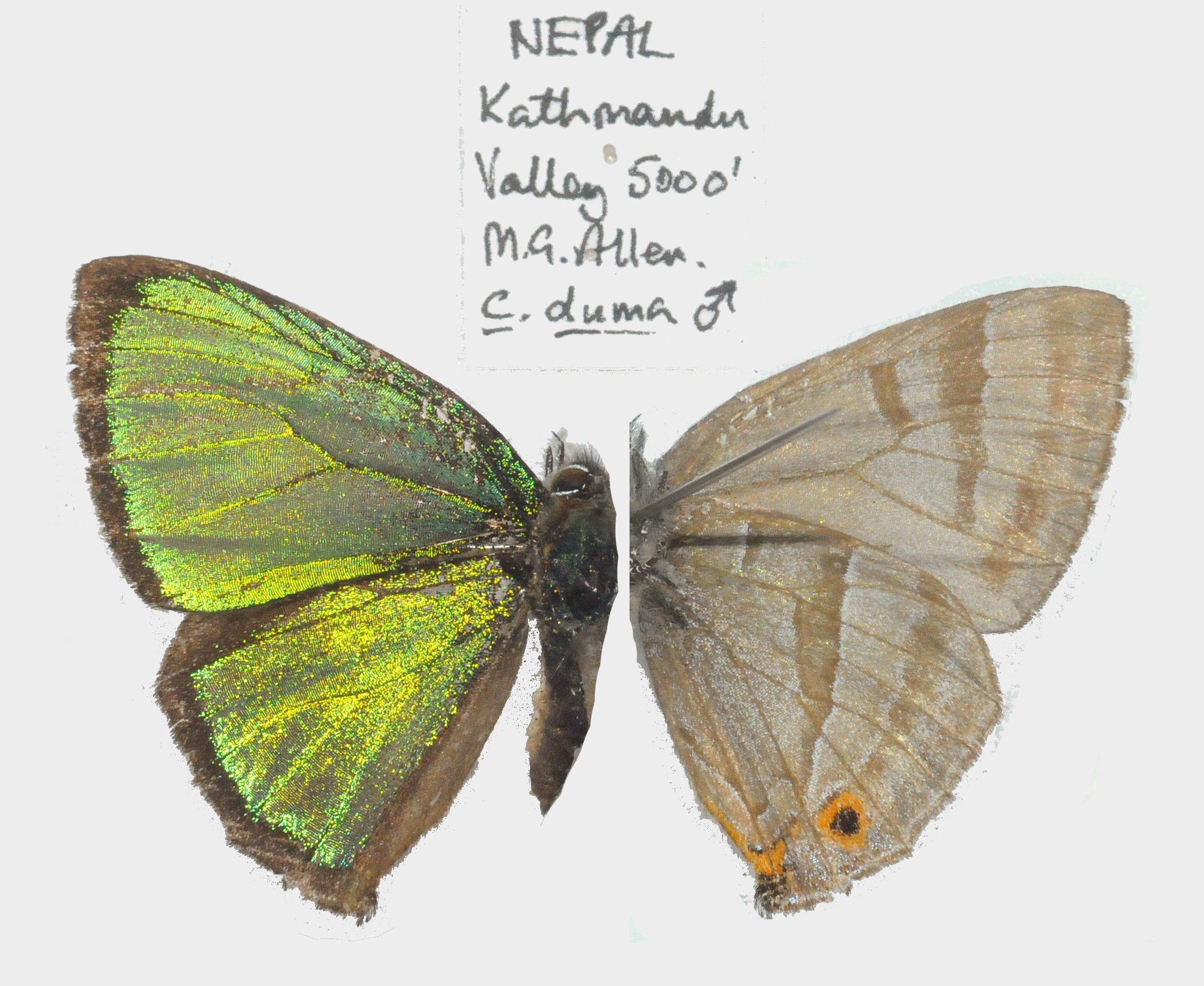

Scientific classification
- Kingdom: Animalia
- Phylum: Arthropoda
- Class: Insecta
- Order: Lepidoptera
- Family: Lycaenidae
- Genus: Chrysozephyrus
- Species: C. duma

Binomial name
- Chrysozephyrus duma (Hewitson, 1869)

Synonyms
- Dipsas duma Hewitson, 1869; Chrysozephyrus duma sadayukii Koiwaya, 1996; Chrysozephyrus duma sakakibarai Koiwaya, 2000; Thecla desgodinsi Oberthür, 1886; Zephyrus desgodinsi Oberthür, 1914

= Chrysozephyrus duma =

Metallic green hairstreak

Species of butterfly

Chrysozephyrus duma, the metallic green hairstreak, is a small butterfly found in India that belongs to the lycaenids or blues family.

== Subspecies ==
- Chrysozephyrus duma duma
- Chrysozephyrus duma desgodinsi (Oberthür, 1886) (western China, Szechwan, Yunnan)
- Chrysozephyrus duma makikoae Morita, 2002 (northern Vietnam)

== Range ==
The butterfly occurs in India from Sikkim to Nagaland and Manipur, Bhutan and south western China.

== See also ==
- List of butterflies of India (Lycaenidae)
