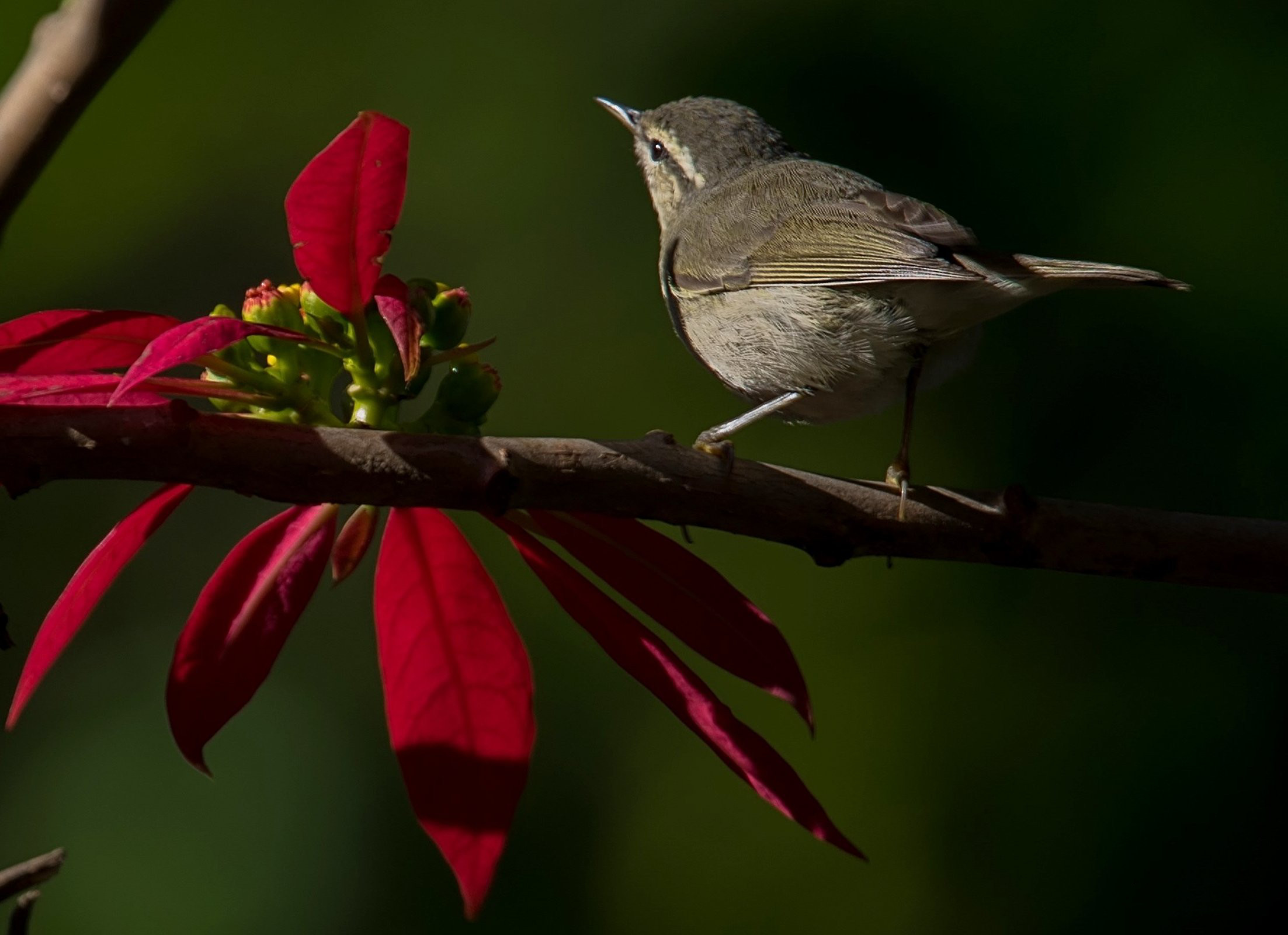
- In the Nandi Hills, outskirts of Bangalore

Conservation status
- Least Concern (IUCN 3.1)

Scientific classification
- Kingdom: Animalia
- Phylum: Chordata
- Class: Aves
- Order: Passeriformes
- Family: Phylloscopidae
- Genus: Phylloscopus
- Species: P. tytleri

Binomial name
- Phylloscopus tytleri Brooks, 1871

= Tytler's leaf warbler =

Species of bird

Tytler's leaf warbler (Phylloscopus tytleri) is a songbird species. Like all leaf warblers, it was formerly placed in the "Old World warbler" assemblage, but now belongs to the new leaf-warbler family Phylloscopidae.

It is found in Afghanistan, Pakistan, Nepal, and India. It passes through the Western Himalayas to winter in southern India, particularly in the Western Ghats and the Nilgiris.

Its breeding habitat is subtropical or tropical moist montane forests. It is threatened by habitat loss. It breeds in the Northwestern Himalayan region and is suspected to breed in the Garhwal and Kumaon Himalayas. Its non-breeding habits includes the use of a variety of different habitats including horticultural gardens, coffee estates, shola forests, and patches of greenery in urban areas.

The name commemorates the British naturalist Robert Christopher Tytler.

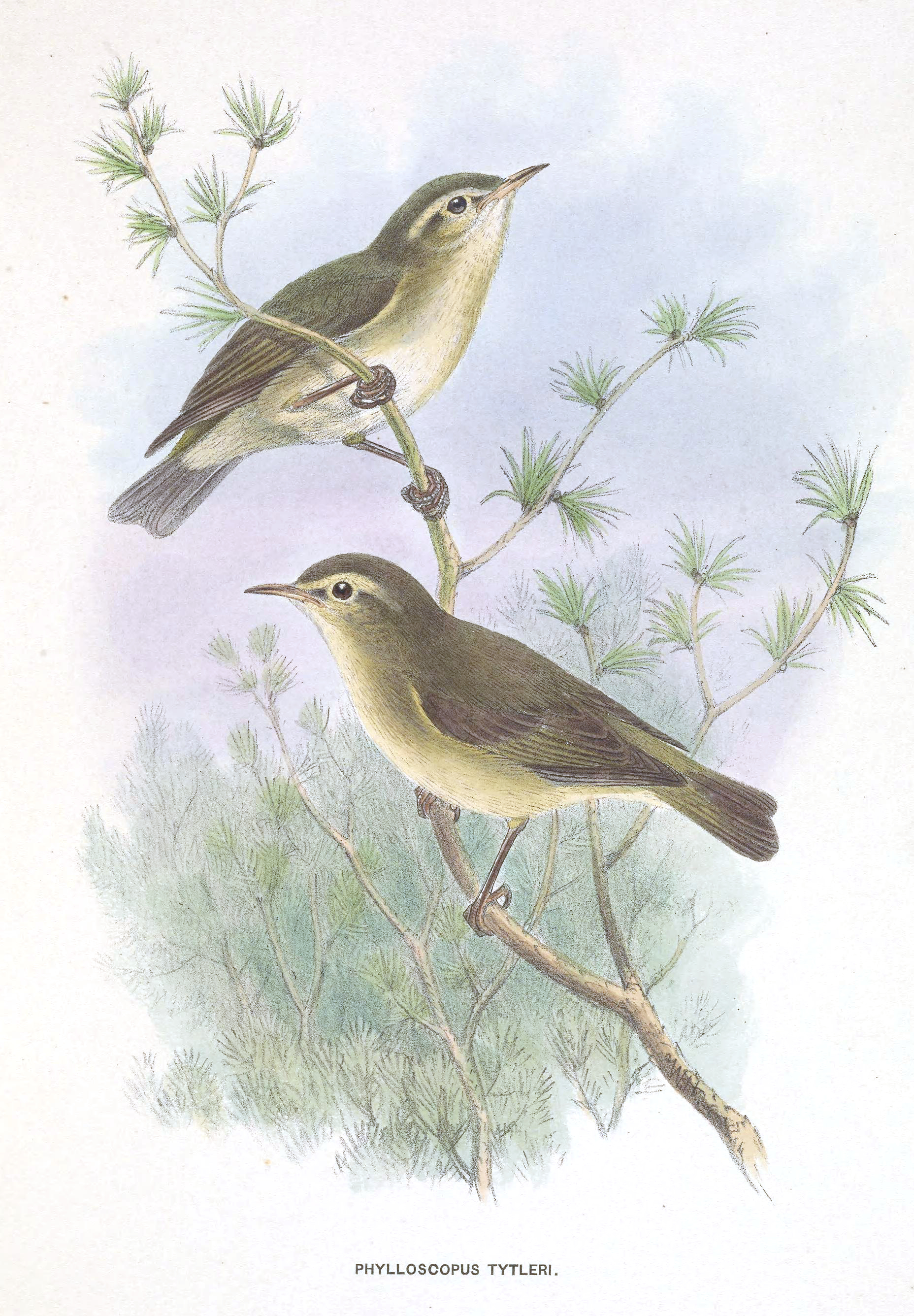
Illustration

== Identification ==
In museum specimens, the thin bill is clear and there is a long exposed nasal groove along the bill. The rictal bristles are short and few and the feathering at the base of the beak is reduced giving a very pointed face profile. The lower mandible is not flesh coloured in tytleri as in most trochiloides and it is not dark black as in Phylloscopus collybita tristis. They do not have any wing bars.
