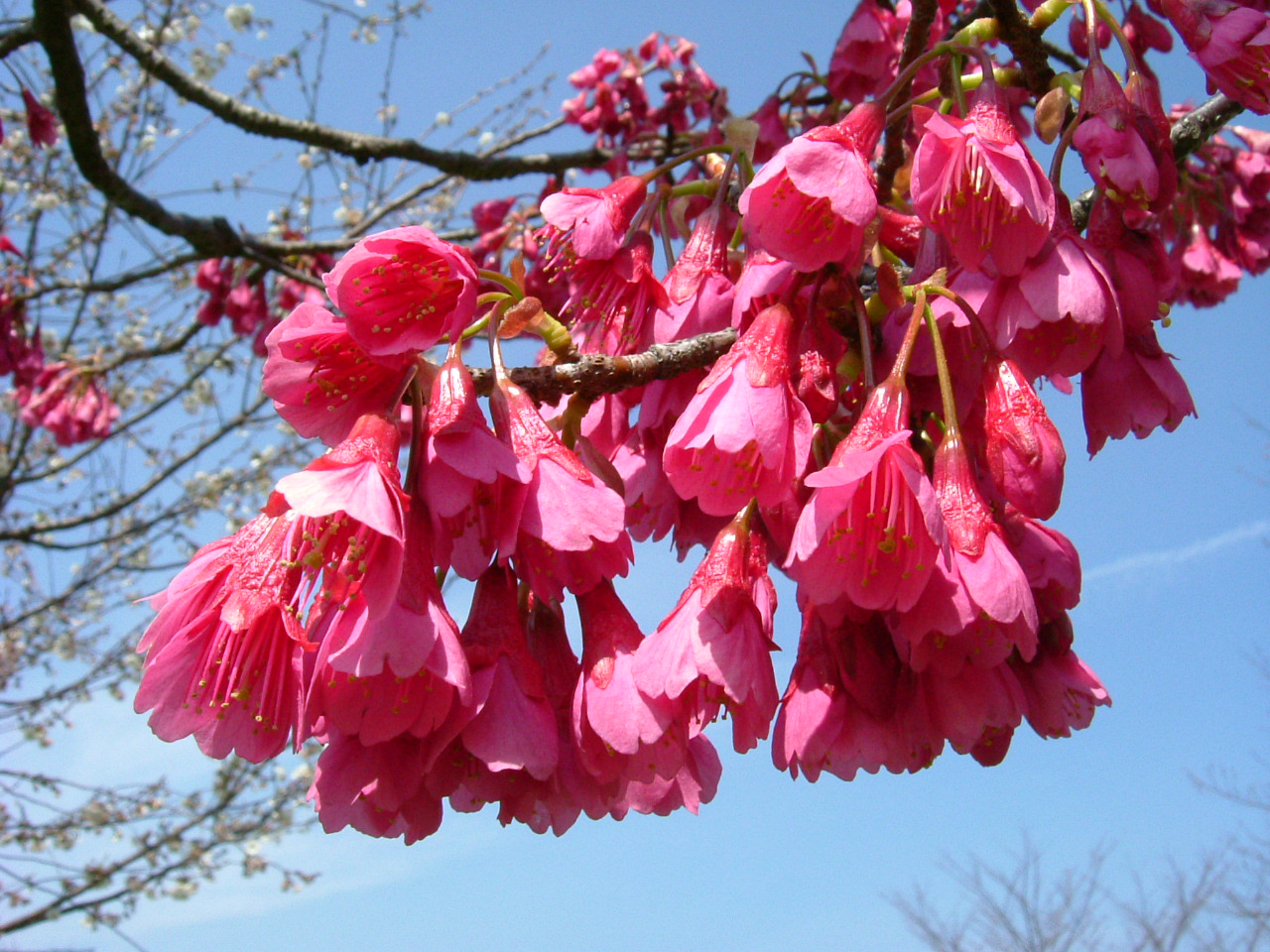
- Prunus campanulata blossoms

Scientific classification
- Kingdom: Plantae
- Clade: Tracheophytes
- Clade: Angiosperms
- Clade: Eudicots
- Clade: Rosids
- Order: Rosales
- Family: Rosaceae
- Genus: Prunus
- Subgenus: Prunus subg. Cerasus
- Section: P. sect. Cerasus
- Species: P. campanulata

Binomial name
- Prunus campanulata Maxim.

Synonyms
- Cerasus campanulata (Maxim.) A.Vassiliev; Prunus cerasoides var. campanulata (Maxim.) Koidz.; Prunus pendula hort.

= Prunus campanulata =

Taiwan cherry

Species of tree

Prunus campanulata is a species of cherry native to Japan, Taiwan, southern and eastern China (Guangxi, Guangdong, Hainan, Hunan, Fujian, and Zhejiang), and Vietnam. It is a large shrub or small tree, growing 3–8 m (10–26 ft) tall. It is widely grown as an ornamental tree, and a symbol of Nago in the Ryukyu Islands of Japan. It is variously known in English as the Taiwan cherry, Formosan cherry, or bellflower cherry. It was described in 1883 by Carl Johann Maximowicz.

== Invasive species ==
The tree is an invasive plant species in some areas of New Zealand. In the Northland Region of New Zealand it is illegal to distribute, sell or propagate the plant or to distribute soil, gravel, etc., that contain the seeds or other parts of the plant.

== Ecological interactions ==
Prunus campanulata is the host of larval Chrysozephyrus nishikaze, a butterfly species endemic to Taiwan. Flowers and nectar of Prunus campanulata are among the main food sources of Taiwan yuhinas during their breeding season.

== Reproduction ==
Prunus campanulata is one of the many cherry blossom trees that blooms early. Their seeds portray a physiological and morphological dormancy that is broken when exposed to cold and warm temperatures before germination. The flower is fertilized by pollinating insects and can begin to flower in 1 to 2 years.

== Cultivars ==
In Japan, a large number of cultivars have been developed from this species through both natural hybridization with other species and intentional crossbreeding. Among these, the earliest to become widespread and the most representative are Prunus × kanzakura 'Kawazu-zakura' and Prunus 'Yoko'. Both are popular for their distinctly deep pink petals and early flowering period, traits influenced by the genetic characteristics of this species, which clearly distinguish them from Somei-yoshino, the most widely known cherry tree. However, unlike this species, neither exhibits the characteristic bell-shaped flowers; instead, they produce much larger blossoms and differ in flowering season.

=== Kawazu-zakura ===
'Kawazu-zakura' originated around 1950 from a wild seedling discovered along the Kawazu River in Kawazu, Shizuoka Prefecture, which was cultivated at the residence of Michinobu Iida and later developed into a named cultivar. The original tree is still extant. It is considered to have arisen from an interspecific hybrid, likely through natural hybridization with Oshima cherry. Flowering from late February to early March, it blooms significantly earlier than most cherry trees, and the rows of trees along the river have become a major tourist attraction in the town.

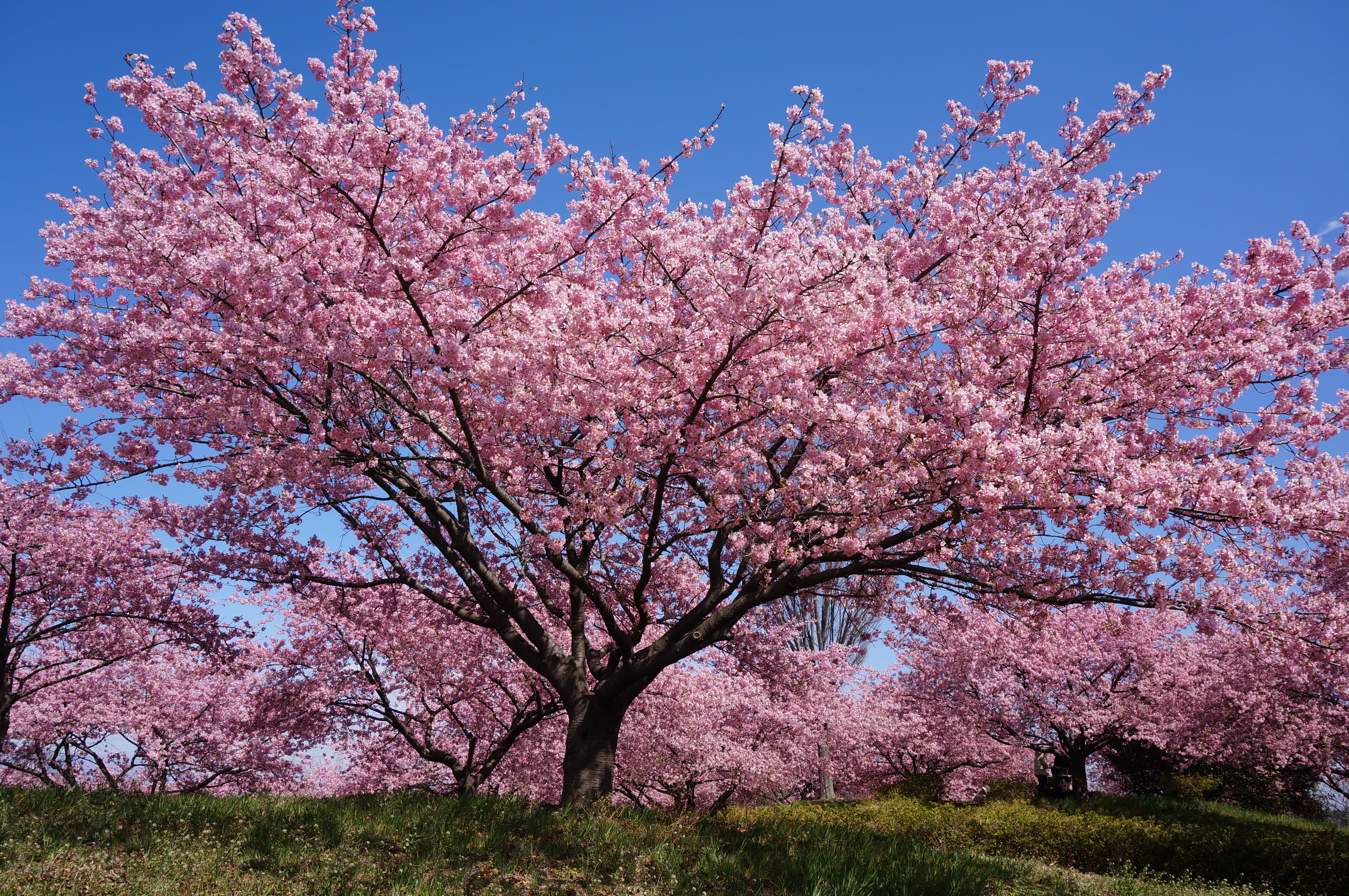
Prunus × kanzakura 'Kawazu-zakura'

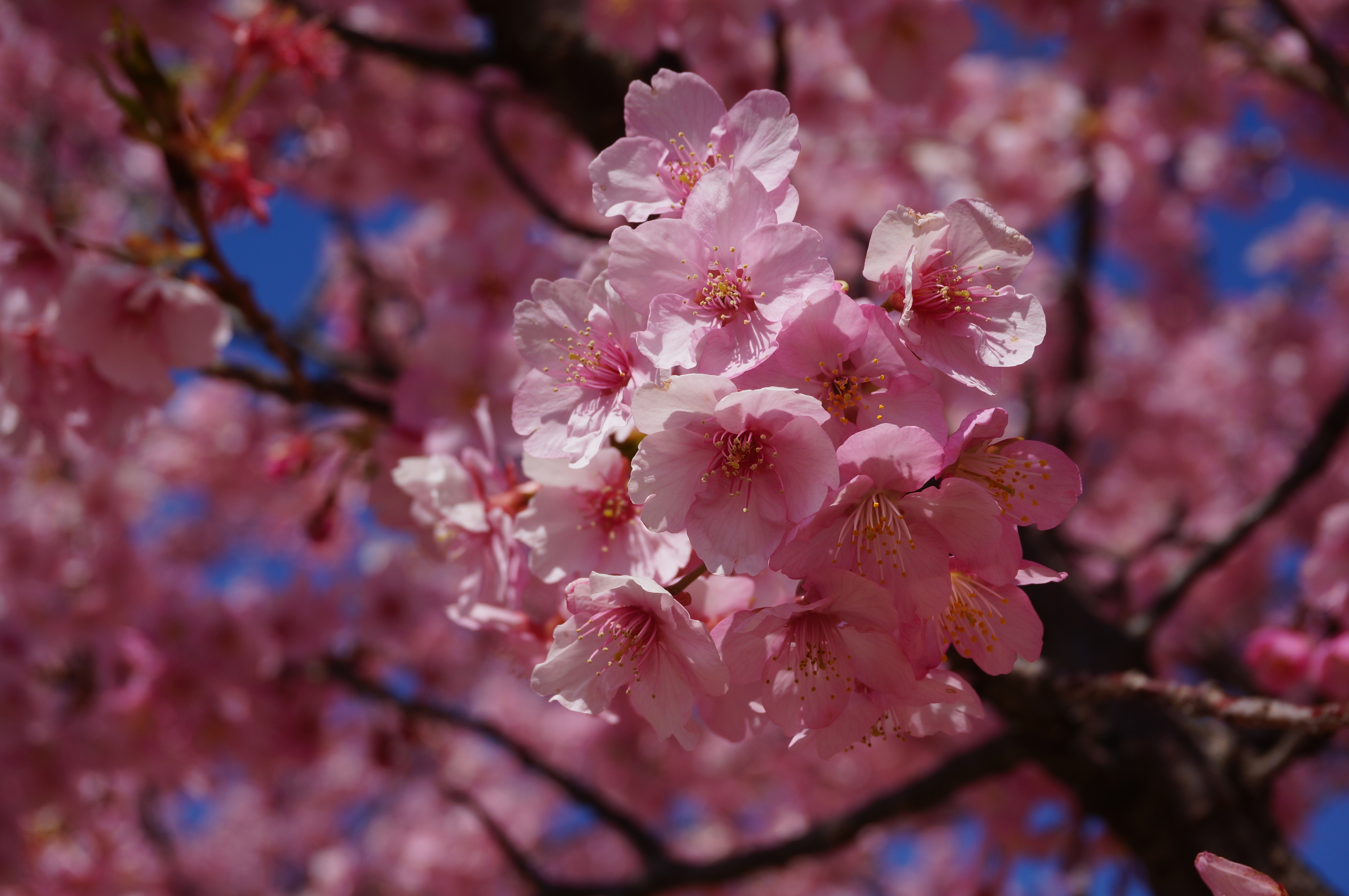
Prunus × kanzakura 'Kawazu-zakura'

=== Yoko ===
'Yoko', meaning "sunlight," was developed in 1981 by Masaaki Takaoka, the founder and first president of Hakata Salt Co., Ltd., who resided in Tōon, Ehime Prefecture. After 25 years of trial and error, he selected it from progeny obtained by crossing 'Amagi-yoshino' with this species. It is a cultivar noted for its resistance to Witch's broom disease.

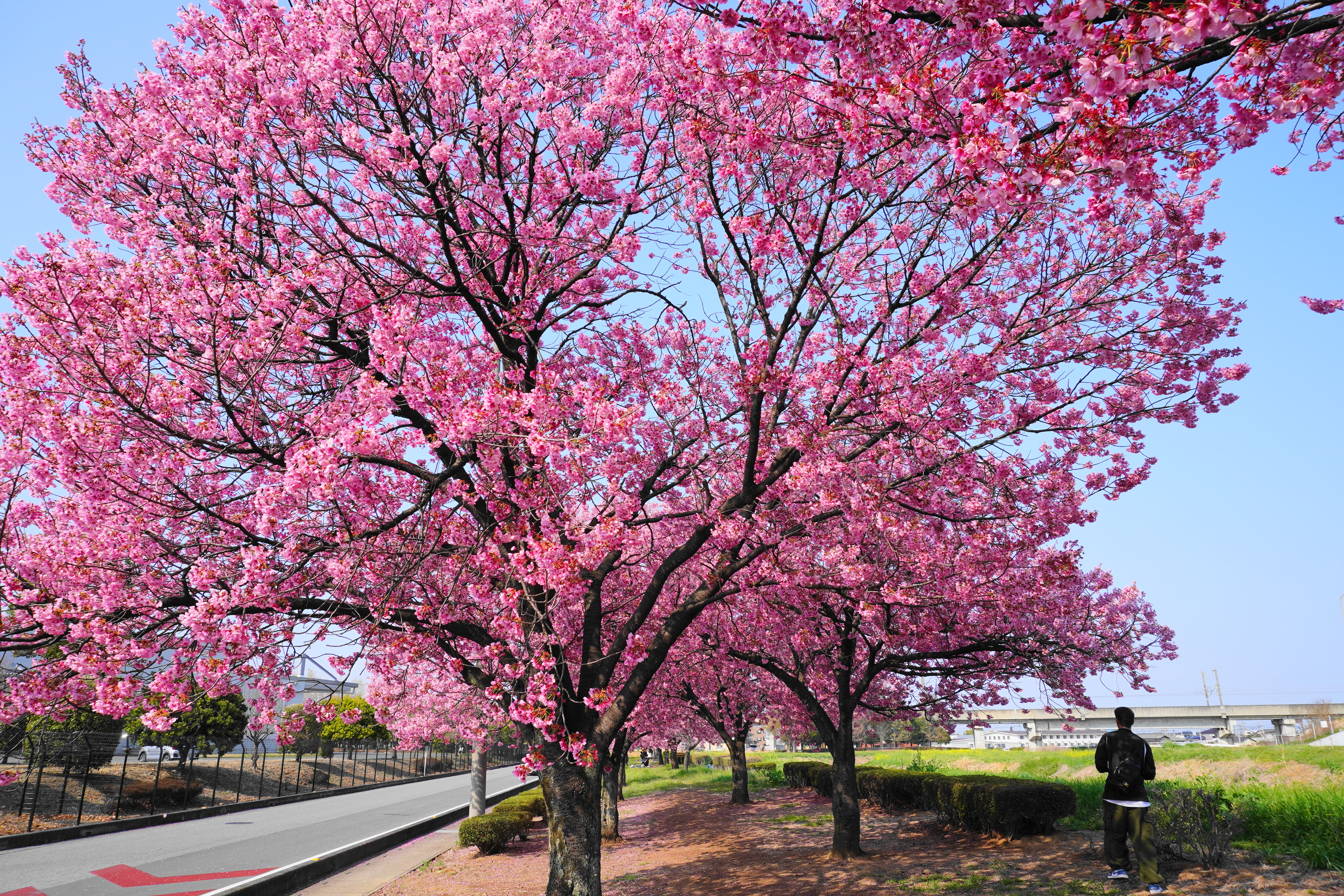
Prunus 'Yoko'

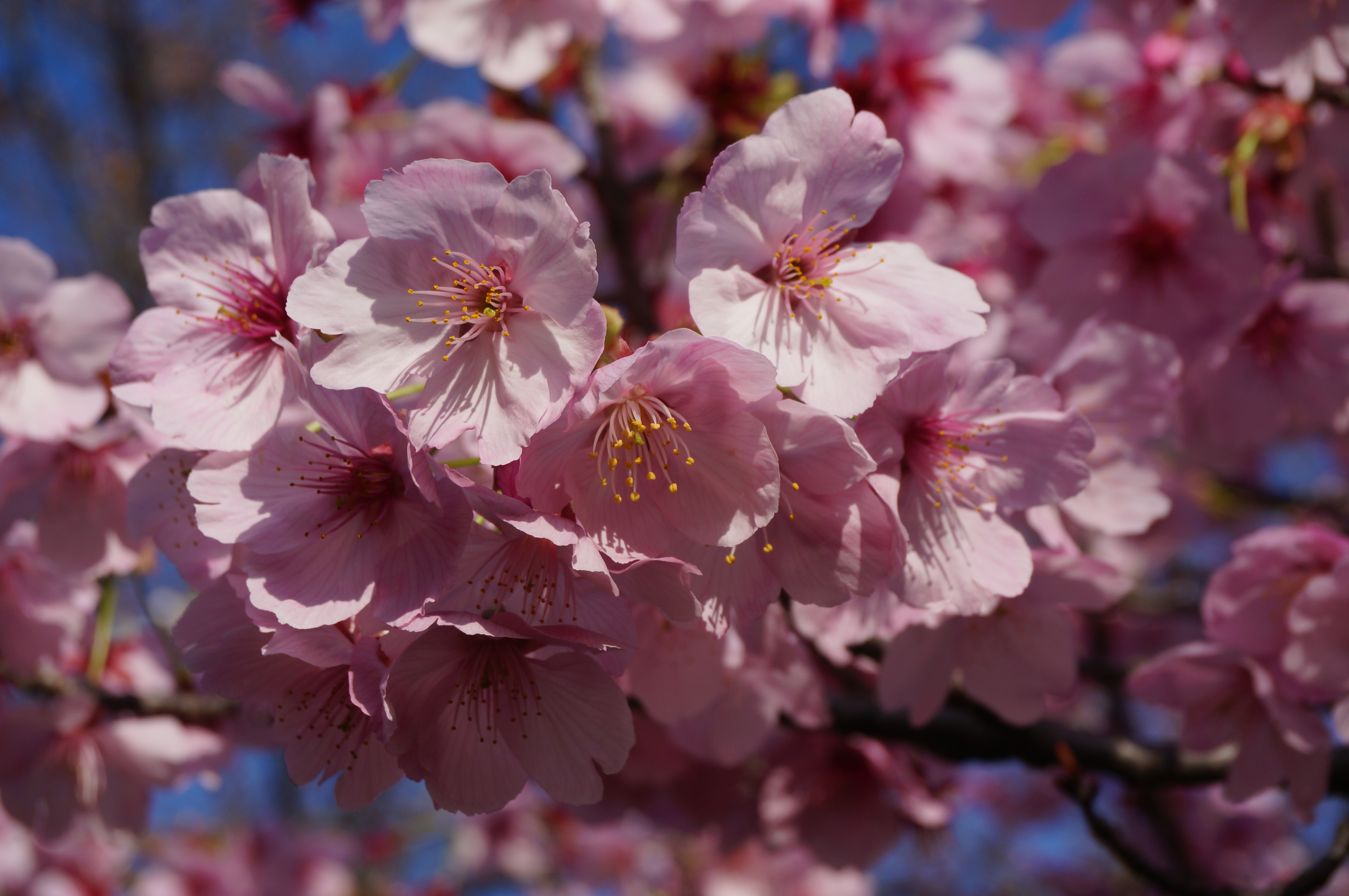
Prunus 'Yoko'

== Images ==
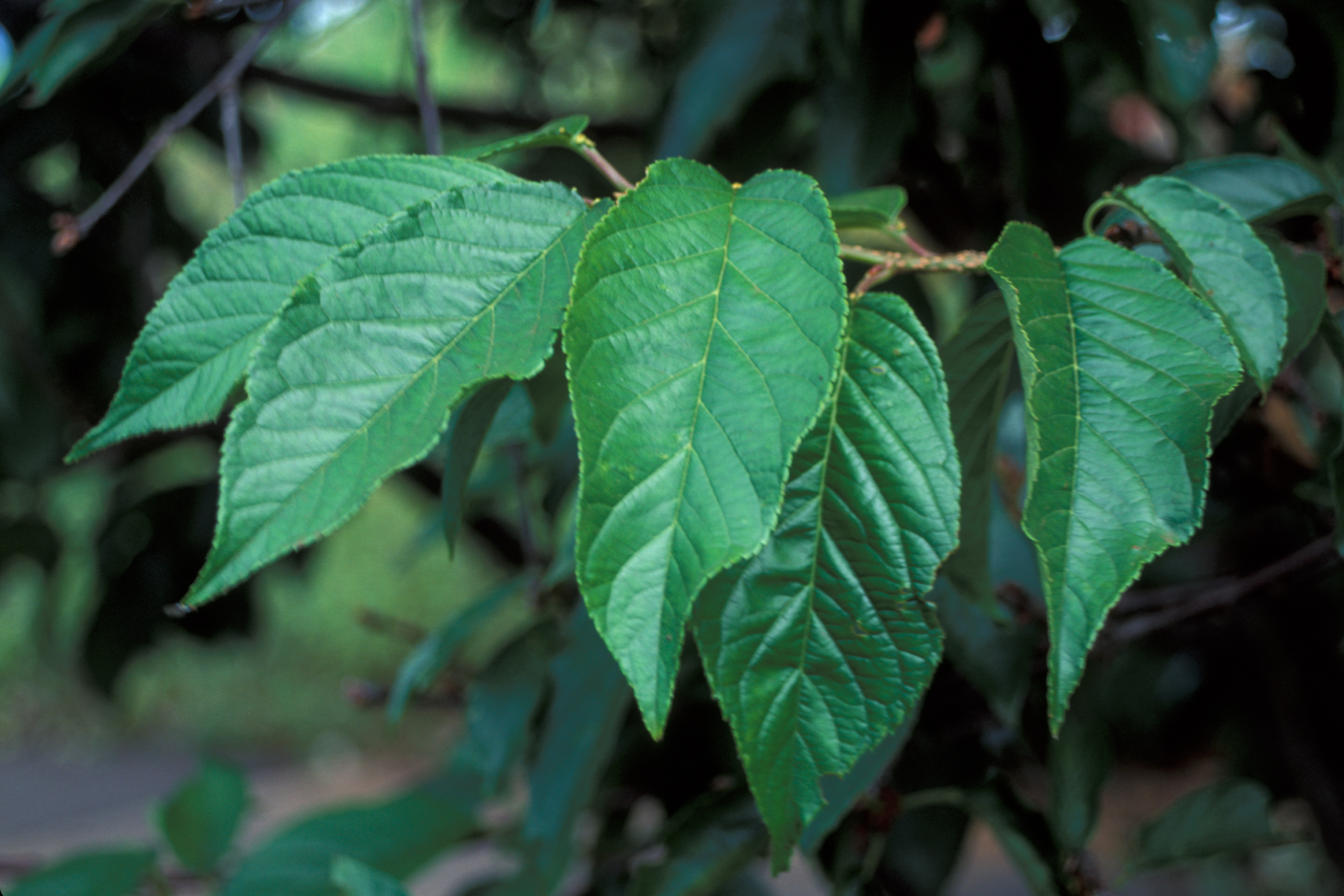
Prunus campanulata foliage

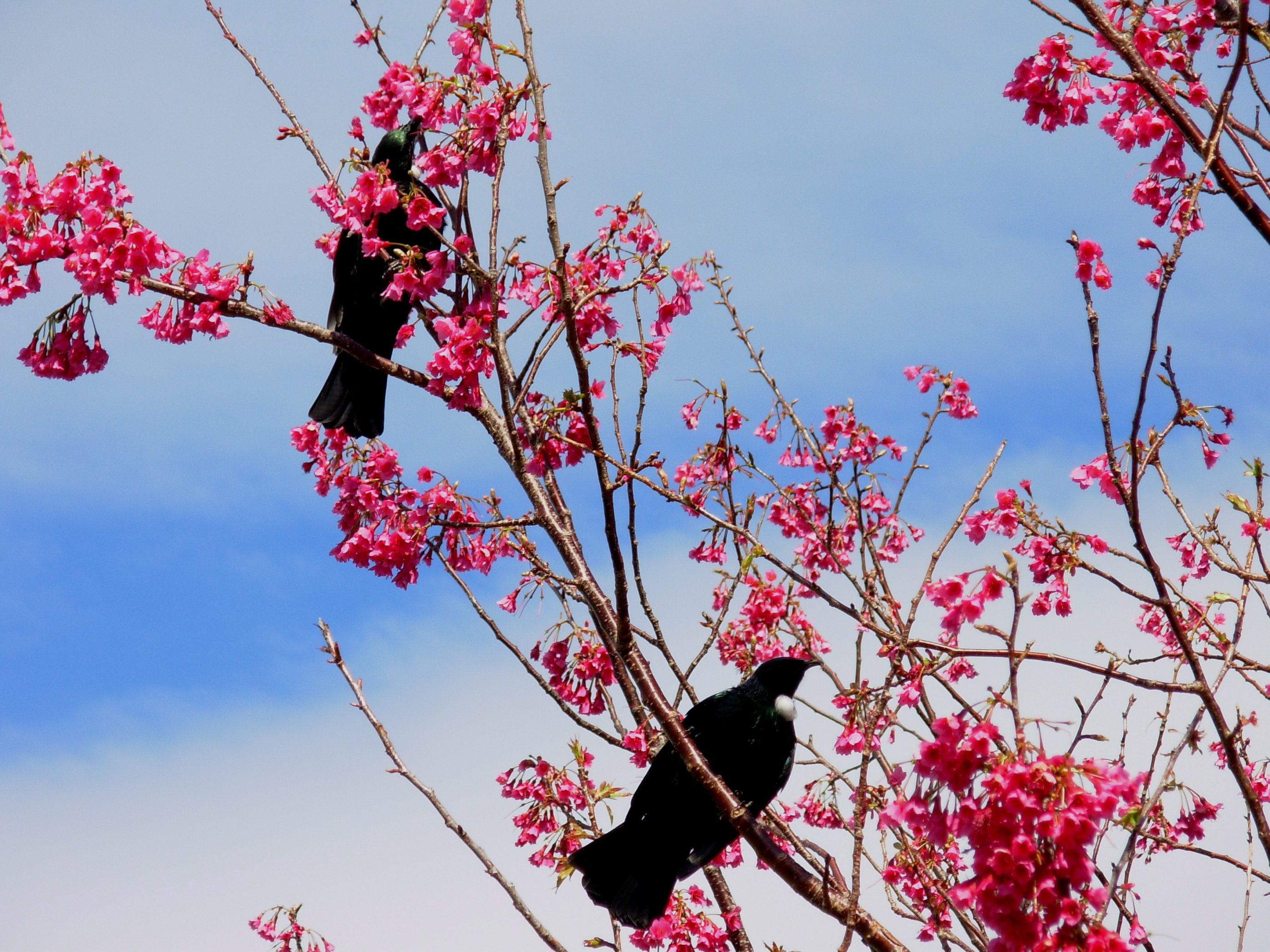
Two tūī in a flowering P. campanulata tree

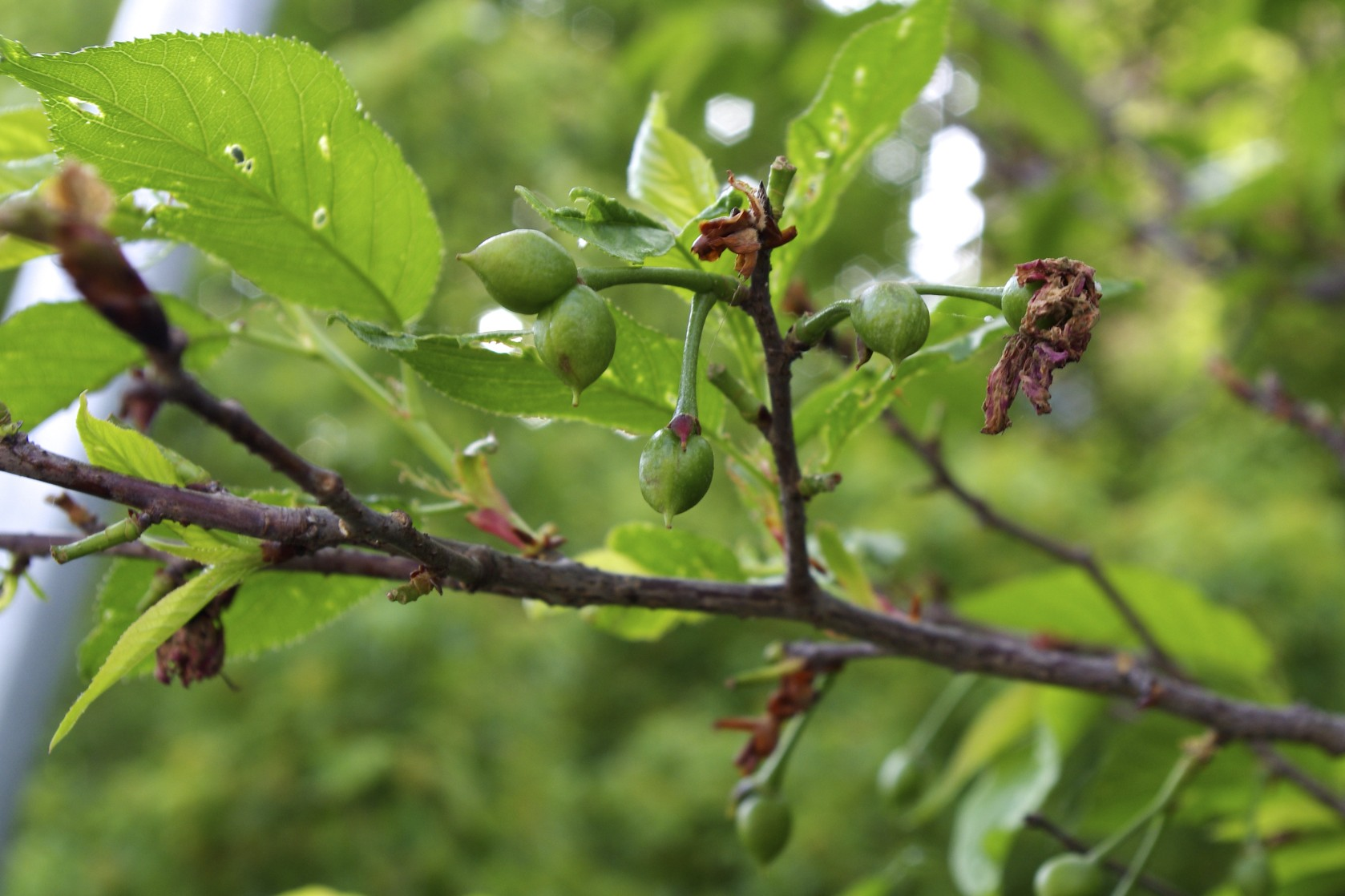
Prunus campanulata young fruit

== Sources ==
- Katsuki, Toshio (2015). Sakura (in Japanese). Iwanami Shoten. ISBN 978-4-00-431534-6.
