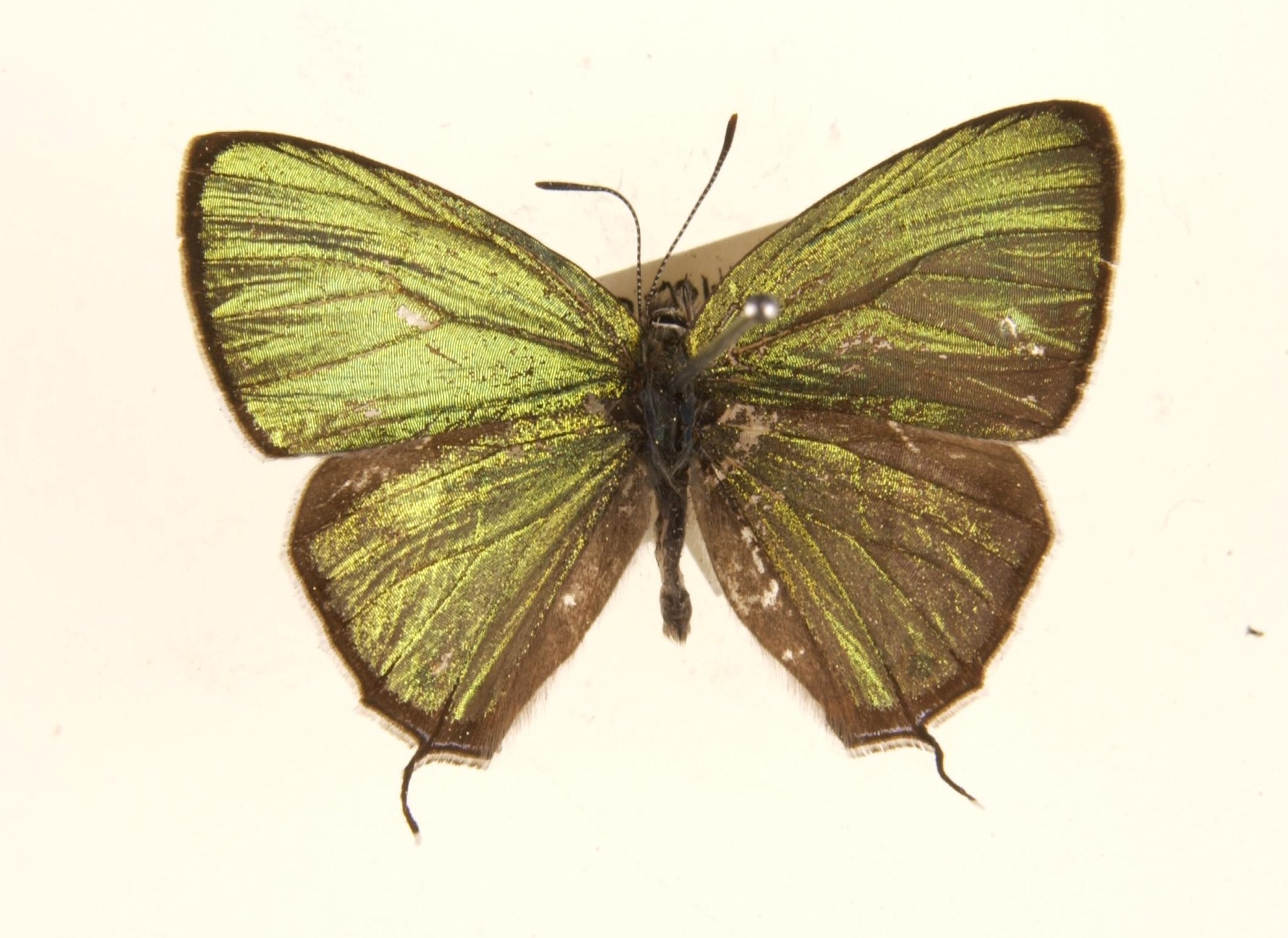
- Specimen from Taiwan

Scientific classification
- Kingdom: Animalia
- Phylum: Arthropoda
- Class: Insecta
- Order: Lepidoptera
- Family: Lycaenidae
- Genus: Chrysozephyrus
- Species: C. kabrua

Binomial name
- Chrysozephyrus kabrua (Tytler, 1915)

Synonyms
- Zephyrus kabrua Tytler, 1915

= Chrysozephyrus kabrua =

Kabru hairstreak

Species of butterfly

Chrysozephyrus kabrua, the Kabru hairstreak, is a small butterfly found in India that belongs to the lycaenids or blues family.

== Taxonomy ==
The butterfly was previously classified as Thecla kabrua Tytler.

== Subspecies ==
- Chrysozephyrus kabrua niitakanus (Kano, 1928) Taiwan
- Chrysozephyrus kabrua neidhoeferi Shimonoya & Murayama, 1971 Taiwan
- Chrysozephyrus kabrua philipi Eliot, 1987 northern Thailand
- Chrysozephyrus kabrua ueharai Koiwaya & Osada, 1998 Laos
- Chrysozephyrus kabrua konga Yoshino, 1999 Sichuan
- Chrysozephyrus kabrua aungseini Koiwaya, 2000 Myanmar
- Chrysozephyrus kabrua naokoae Morita, 2002 northern Vietnam

== India range ==
The butterfly occurs in India from Nagaland to Manipur.

== See also ==
- List of butterflies of India (Lycaenidae)
