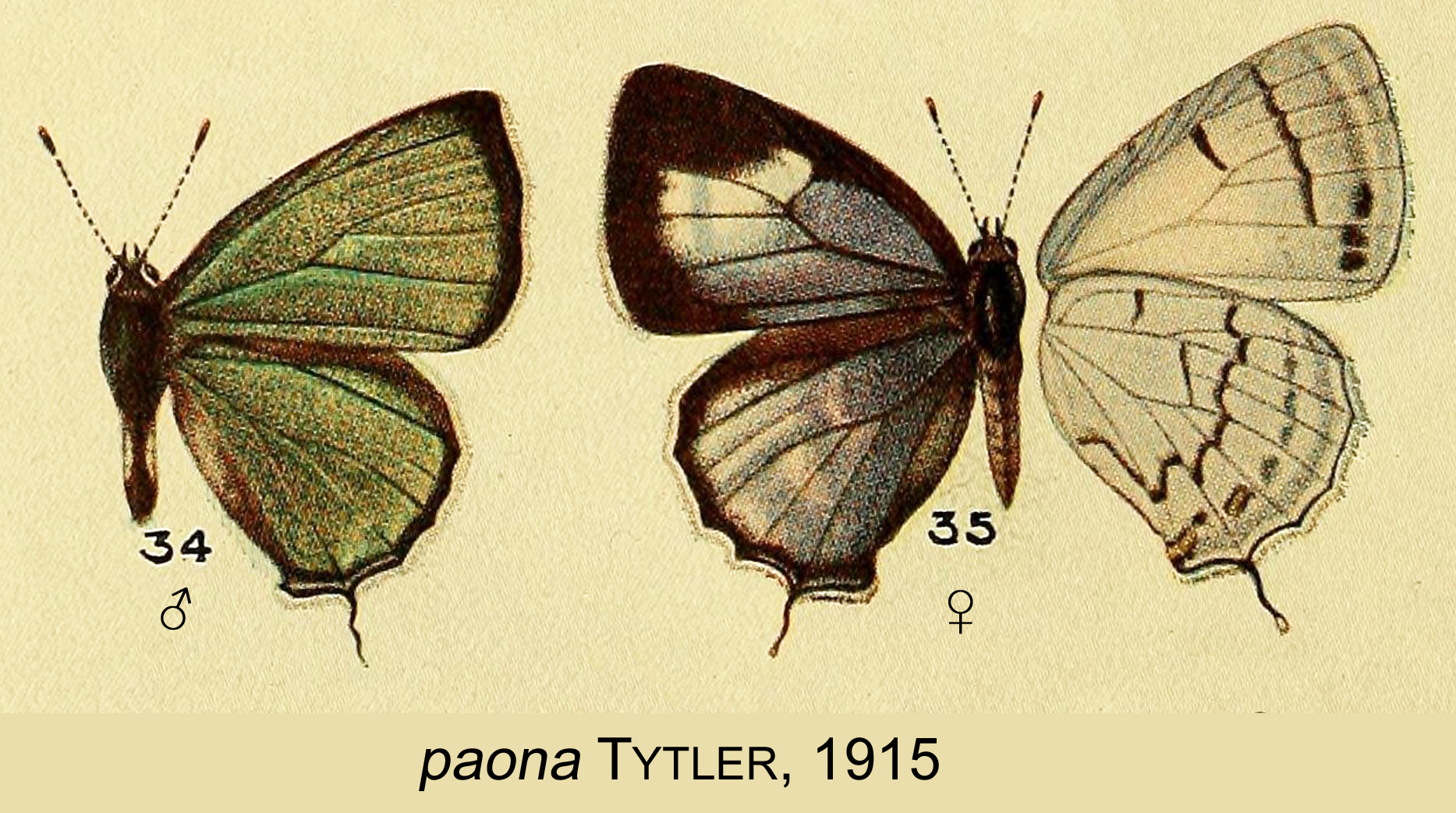

Scientific classification
- Kingdom: Animalia
- Phylum: Arthropoda
- Class: Insecta
- Order: Lepidoptera
- Family: Lycaenidae
- Genus: Shirozuozephyrus
- Species: S. paona

Binomial name
- Shirozuozephyrus paona (Tytler, 1915)

= Shirozuozephyrus paona =

Paona hairstreak

Species of butterfly

Shirozuozephyrus paona, the Paona hairstreak, is a small butterfly found in India that belongs to the lycaenids or blues family.

== Taxonomy ==
The butterfly was previously classified as Thecla paona Moore.

== Range ==
The butterfly occurs in India in Manipur.

== Status ==
In 1932 William Harry Evans described the species as very rare.

== See also ==
- List of butterflies of India (Lycaenidae)
