= Shirozuozephyrus jakamensis =

Jakama hairstreak

Scientific classification
- Kingdom: Animalia
- Phylum: Arthropoda
- Clade: Pancrustacea
- Class: Insecta
- Order: Lepidoptera
- Family: Lycaenidae
- Genus: Shirozuozephyrus
- Species: S. jakamensis

Binomial name
- Shirozuozephyrus jakamensis (Tytler, 1915)

Species of butterfly

Shirozuozephyrus jakamensis

Shirozuozephyrus jakamensis, the jakama hairstreak, is a small butterfly found in India that belongs to the lycaenids or blues family.

== Taxonomy ==
The butterfly was previously classified as Thecla jakamensis Tytler.

== Range ==
The butterfly occurs in India from Nagaland to Manipur.

== Status ==
In 1932 William Harry Evans described the species as rare.

== See also ==
- List of butterflies of India (Lycaenidae)
