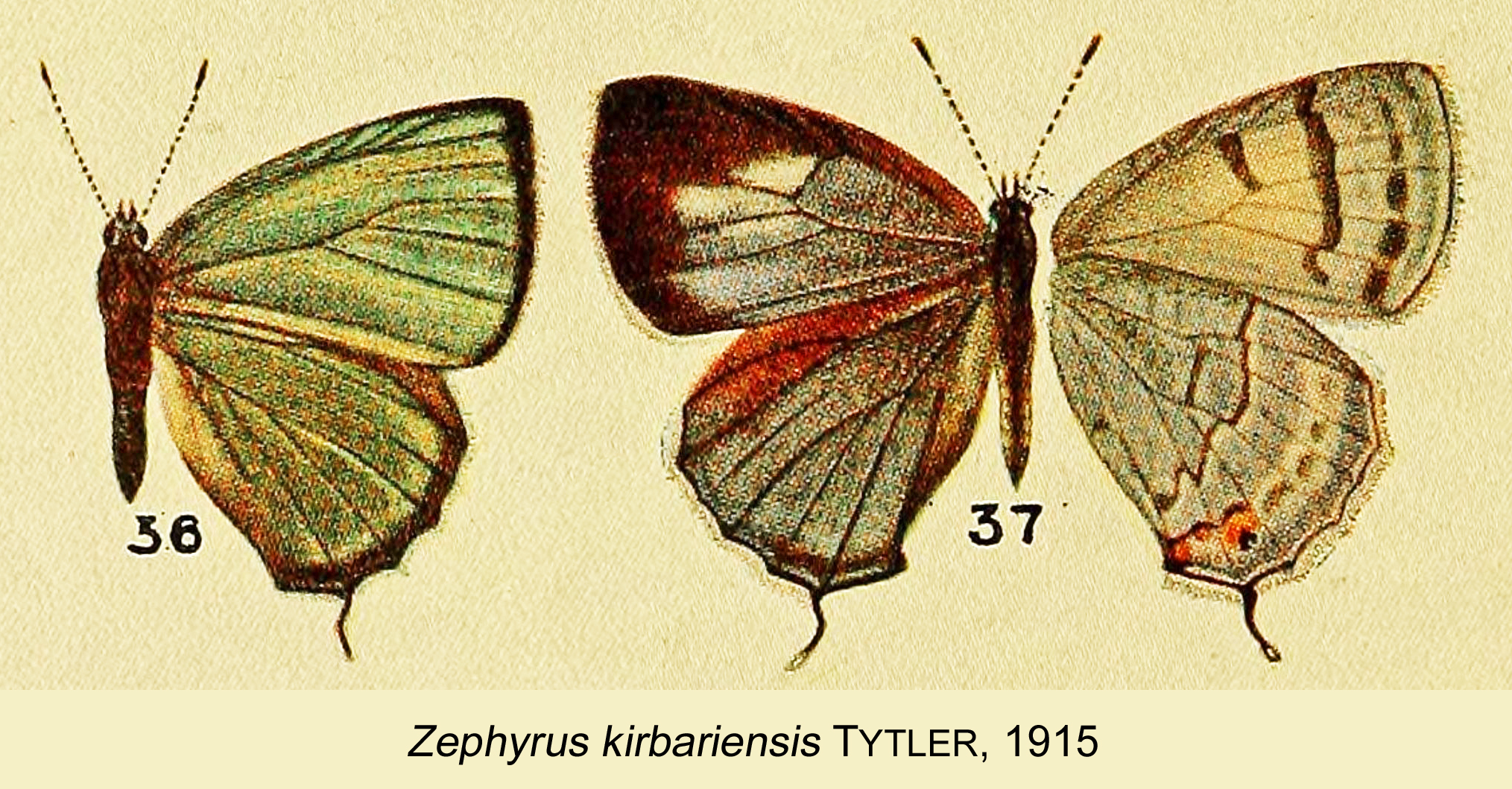
- Shirozuozephyrus kirbariensis depicted in Tytler,1915

Scientific classification
- Kingdom: Animalia
- Phylum: Arthropoda
- Class: Insecta
- Order: Lepidoptera
- Family: Lycaenidae
- Genus: Shirozuozephyrus
- Species: S. kirbariensis

Binomial name
- Shirozuozephyrus kirbariensis (Tytler, 1915)

= Shirozuozephyrus kirbariensis =

Kirbari hairstreak

Species of butterfly

Shirozuozephyrus kirbariensis, the Kirbari hairstreak, is a small butterfly found in India that belongs to the lycaenids or blues family.

== Taxonomy ==
The butterfly was previously classified as Thecla kirbariensis Tytler.

== Range ==
The butterfly occurs in India from Assam, Manipur, Nagaland and onto Myanmar.

== Status ==
In 1932 William Harry Evans described the species as rare.
