= James Pattison Walker =

British surgeon who served in India (1823–1906)

James Pattison Walker (17 March 1823 – 14 February 1906, Clacton-on-Sea) was a British surgeon who served as Surgeon-General in the Indian Medical Service. He was present at the fort of Agra during the 1857 rebellion and was appointed the first Superintendent of the Penal Settlement in the Andamans, which had been created to accommodate prisoners from the 1857 uprising.

== Education ==
Walker was educated at King's College, Aberdeen receiving an M.D. in 1842 and MRCS in 1844.

== Career ==
Walker joined the Bengal Medical Service on 5 April 1845. He worked in Bengal, the North-West Provinces and Punjab and became a Civil Surgeon at Hamirpur in 1848. In 1851 he was superintendent of the Agra jail. In 1855-56 he examined penal institutions in England and sought to make improvements at the Agra Central Prison. During the 1857 uprising, he had to hold Agra, making use of Sikh prisoners to assist him. At Shahgunge Fort he served as a Sanitary Officer until 1858. The increased number of prisoners from the "mutiny" had to be accommodated elsewhere and the Penal Colony in the Andamans was chosen and Walker appointed as the Superintendent. More than 80 prisoners who attempted to flee the colony, where they were subjected to abysmal living conditions, disease, starvation and forced labor, were summarily executed under Walker’s orders. There were other incidents such as the Battle of Aberdeen that finally led to his resignation in 1859.

He worked as a professor of hygiene at the Calcutta Medical College until 1866 followed by the post of medical charge with the Bengal Sappers and Miners (until 1872). He then became Deputy Inspector General of Hospitals in the Allahabad Circle, serving until 1877 when he was made Surgeon General.

Walker collected Andaman shells and a species, Spiraxis walkeri, was named after him by W.H. Benson in 1863. A voracious reader, he amassed a large private library. He died at his home in Earlsmead and left in his Will, a donation of $30,000 to the Lloyd Library, Cincinnati to which he also donated his library of books and manuscripts. An island in Galathea Bay, north of Parsons Point, once called Walker Island, was marked by a block of grey rock that appeared like a fortress.
