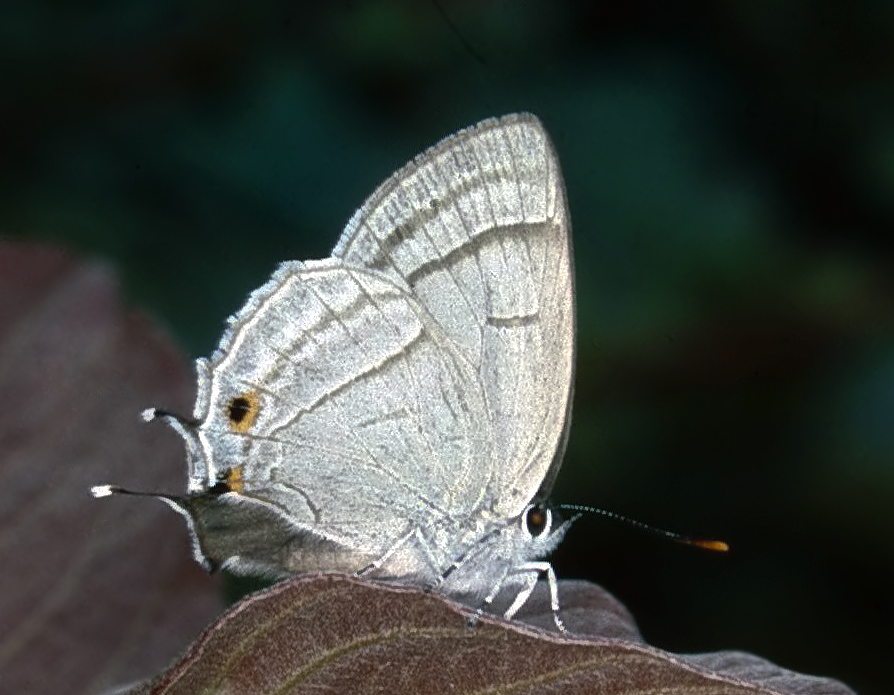
- Nepalese male

Scientific classification
- Kingdom: Animalia
- Phylum: Arthropoda
- Class: Insecta
- Order: Lepidoptera
- Family: Lycaenidae
- Genus: Shirozuozephyrus
- Species: S. birupa

Binomial name
- Shirozuozephyrus birupa (Moore, 1877)

= Shirozuozephyrus birupa =

Fawn hairstreak

Species of butterfly

Shirozuozephyrus birupa, the fawn hairstreak, is a small butterfly found in India that belongs to the lycaenids or blues family.

== Taxonomy ==
The butterfly was previously classified as Thecla birupa Moore.

== Range ==
The butterfly occurs in north west India from Simla to Kumaon, and in Nepal.

== See also ==
- Lycaenidae
- List of butterflies of India (Lycaenidae)
- Wikispecies
