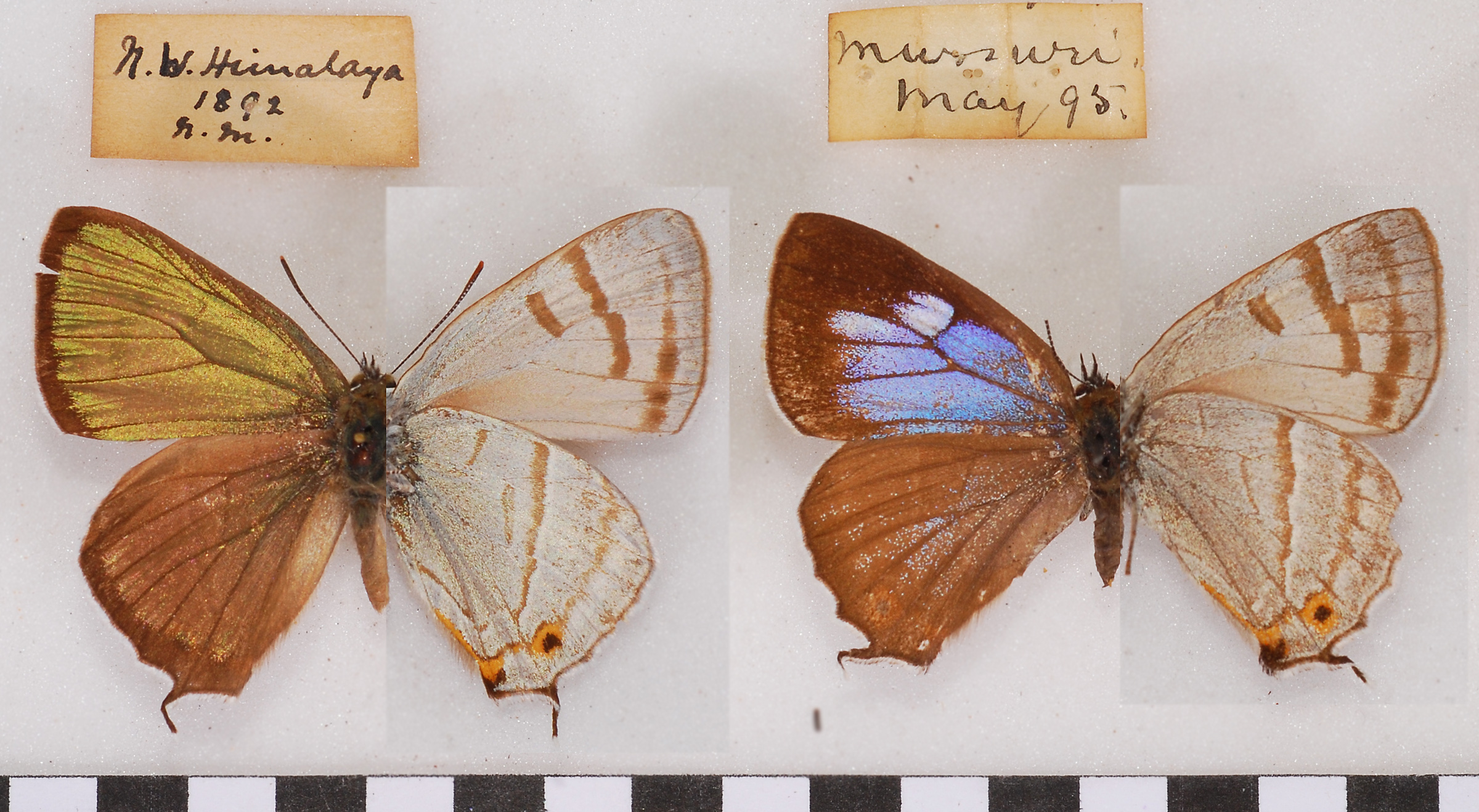
- Inomataozephyrus syla, male and female specimens.

Scientific classification
- Kingdom: Animalia
- Phylum: Arthropoda
- Class: Insecta
- Order: Lepidoptera
- Family: Lycaenidae
- Genus: Inomataozephyrus
- Species: I. syla

Binomial name
- Inomataozephyrus syla (Kollar, 1848)

= Inomataozephyrus syla =

Silver hairstreak

Species of butterfly

Inomataozephyrus syla, the silver hairstreak, is a small butterfly found in India that belongs to the lycaenids or blues family.

== Taxonomy ==
The butterfly was previously classified as Thecla syla Kollar.

== Range ==
The butterfly occurs in Afghanistan, Pakistan and north west India - from Safed Koh, Chitral to Kumaon and from Sikkim to Manipur.

== Status ==
In 1932 William Harry Evans described the species as rare.
