= Battle of Aberdeen (Andaman Islands) =

1859 battle in British India

Location of Aberdeen

The Battle of Aberdeen, on the Andaman Islands of India close to Port Blair, was an armed conflict that occurred on 14 May 1859 (according to Portman but 17 May according to other sources) between the natives of the Andaman islands, the forces of the British colonial government in India, and to some extent the convicts (Indian independence activists) of the Ross Island Penal Colony.

== Background ==
In 1789, the Bengal Presidency established a naval base and penal colony on Chatham Island in the southeast bay of Great Andaman. After two years, the colony was moved to the northeast part of Great Andaman and was named Port Cornwallis. However, there was much disease and death in the penal colony and the government ceased operating it in May 1796.

In 1824, Port Cornwallis was the rendezvous of the fleet carrying the army to the First Burmese War.

The hostile nature of the native inhabitants was highlighted in the 1830s and 1840s, when shipwrecked crews who landed on the Andamans were often attacked and killed by Andamanese tribespeople, and the islands had a reputation for cannibalism. The loss of the Runnymede and the Briton in 1844 during the same storm, while transporting goods and passengers between India and Australia, and the continuous attacks launched by Andamanese tribespeople, which the survivors fought off, alarmed the British government.

In 1855, the government proposed another settlement on the islands, including a convict establishment, but the Indian Rebellion of 1857 forced a delay in its construction. However, the rebellion led to the British holding a large number of prisoners, who could be held more securely and at less risk in an offshore penal colony than on the Indian mainland, and so the development of a new Andaman settlement and prison became a perceived necessity. The first prisoners landed at the Andaman Islands on 10 March 1858, and were soon engaged in clearing the dense forest of Ross Island, building their own shelters and other buildings, and laying roads, while living and working in extremely arduous conditions.

== Prelude to battle ==
The plan of the impending attack was revealed by Dudhnath Tewari, an escaped convict who had lived with the tribespeople for some time. Tewari, convict number 276, had escaped on 6 April 1858 with several other prisoners from Ross Island and had been taken prisoner by the tribesmen after the others had been killed, and he had been shot and wounded. Tewari had then been accepted and allowed to live with the locals, and even made to marry two tribal girls. When he heard of the plan to attack the prison colony, Tewari returned on 23 April to inform the superintendent of the penal colony, Dr J.P. Walker of the impending attack. The natives were armed with bows and arrows, spears and knives, while the British were equipped with firearms. Tewari had been imprisoned for his desertion and role in the Indian Rebellion of 1857 and his account has been questioned by some authors, although he was subsequently pardoned by the British for his role in the events.

The battle was preceded by a series of skirmishes. On 6 April 1859, 248 convicts were shot at with arrows by 200 tribals on Haddo. On 14 April another group of convicts was attacked by some 1,500 armed tribals, with the convicts being forced to jump into the sea to escape. The tribals were described as showing intent to attack only those who did not have fetters (legcuffs) on them. According to the account of Portman, the Andamanese objected to the destruction of the jungle by clearings that were being made by convict workgangs. On 28 April a seaman aboard the schooner Charlotte was struck by an arrow off North Point and Dr Walker forbade anyone from landing there.

== Battle ==
On 14 May, the tribesmen launched a major attack on Aberdeen itself, from Atalanta Point. Expecting such an attack, the navy schooner Charlotte was nearby, and fired on at the attacking tribesmen. The British within the settlement defended themselves with firearms, and the natives never returned to fight again. Shortly after this incident Dr Walker resigned from duty and was succeeded by Colonel J.C. Haughton.

== Aftermath ==
While the tribal forces were defeated, and British policy towards them subsequently became more benevolent approach to the tribes on the islands, they remained hostile to the new arrivals.

== Memorial ==
Today, the battle is commemorated by a memorial in the Rajiv Gandhi Water Sports Complex, in Port Blair Andaman.

== See also ==
- Sentinelese
