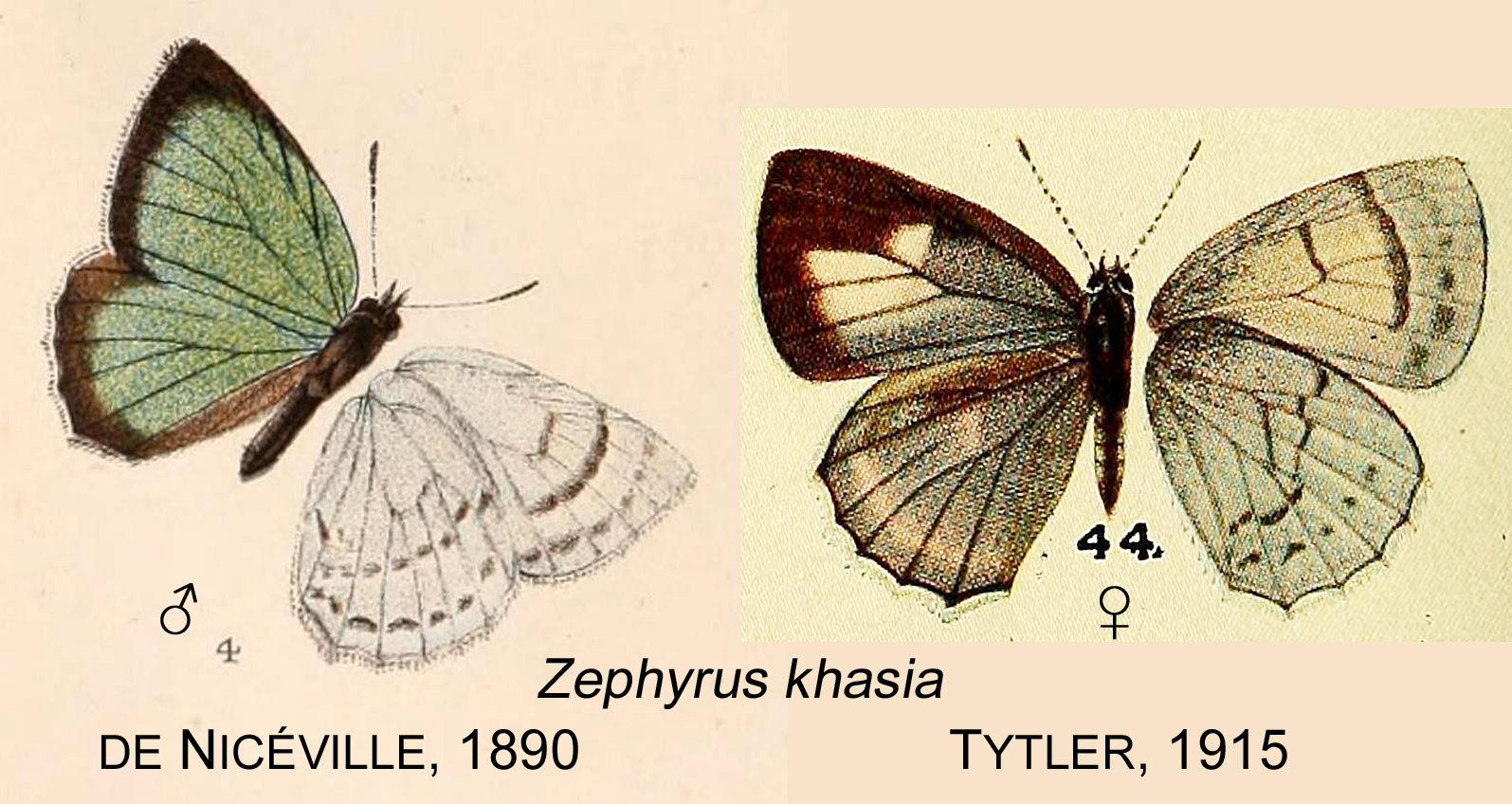
- illustrated in DeNiceville, 1890 and Tytler, 1915

Scientific classification
- Kingdom: Animalia
- Phylum: Arthropoda
- Class: Insecta
- Order: Lepidoptera
- Family: Lycaenidae
- Genus: Shirozuozephyrus
- Species: S. khasia

Binomial name
- Shirozuozephyrus khasia (de Nicéville, 1890)

= Shirozuozephyrus khasia =

Tailless metallic green hairstreak

Species of butterfly

Shirozuozephyrus khasia, the tailless metallic green hairstreak, is a small butterfly found in India that belongs to the lycaenids or blues family.

== Taxonomy ==
The butterfly was previously classified as Thecla khasia de Nicéville.

== Range ==
The butterfly occurs in India from Assam to Manipur and Nagaland.

== Status ==
In 1932 William Harry Evans described the species as rare.

== See also ==
- List of butterflies of India (Lycaenidae)
