= Robert Christopher Tytler =

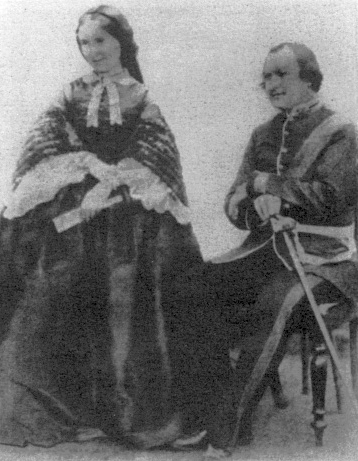
Harriet and Robert Tytler

Robert Christopher Tytler (25 September 1818 – 10 September 1872) was a British soldier, naturalist and photographer. His second wife Harriet C. Tytler is well known for her work in photographing and documenting the monuments of Delhi and for her notes at the time of the 1857 revolt in India. Mount Harriet in the Andamans was named after her. A species of bird, Tytler's leaf warbler, is named after him.

== Biography ==
His father, Robert Tytler (18 Nov 1787 – 17 March 1838, Gwalior), served as a surgeon in the Bengal Native Infantry and his mother, Elizabeth Schneeburg (1782–1852) was the daughter of a German count. Tytler joined the Bengal army in 1834 after going to Leith High School in Edinburgh, and arrived in India in 1835 to join his father's regiment, the 34th Bengal Native Infantry. He saw many years of active military service in India, and in 1842 he was promoted to baggage-master. He later became interpreter and quartermaster and took part in the actions of the First Anglo-Afghan War (1839–42).

In the first Anglo-Sikh War (1845–46), Tytler was put in charge of the campaign funds, and subsequently moved all over northern India with his regiment.

In May 1857, at the beginning of the Indian Rebellion of 1857, Tytler was present when the sepoys of his own unit mutinied against their British officers at Delhi, where he later played a conspicuous part in the ensuing siege. He and his wife were among the important photographers present in the aftermath of Indian Mutiny of 1857, which included Felice Beato and Charles Shepard, during the time he took the notable last image of last Mughal Emperor, Bahadur Shah Zafar II. He was eventually promoted to Colonel and appointed officiating Superintendent of the Convict Settlement at Port Blair in the Andaman Islands from April 1862 to February 1864. Tytler's short service here was due to the murder of an English sailor and the subsequent turn of events. Tytler's predecessor Colonel J.C. Haughton who replaced J.P. Walker had restored peace after the violent clashes with the Andamanese (including the so-called Battle of Aberdeen). To maintain the peace Tytler had continued a policy of sending small parties of sailors to the Andamanese habitations. On one such visit, a sailor named Pratt had attempted to rape an Andamanese woman and two natives killed him in an ensuing fight. Tytler heard a version from other sailors and sought to take revenge on the Andaman tribals and eventually the two suspects were caught. The Government of India was unhappy with Tytler's actions and noted that "if when the unfortunate seaman was shot, two or three of the Natives had been instantly seized as hostages instead of indiscriminate fire being begun upon a party of savages among whom women were present, the interest of humanity and civilisation would have been better consulted." When the two suspects who were nicknamed Snowball and Jumbo were captured in February 1863, it became clear that the fault had been with Pratt. The two were eventually released and Jumbo's wife (nicknamed Topsy) visited the prisoners and helped convince the other Andamanese that the men had been kept unharmed. These results convinced Tytler and Rev Henry Fisher Corbyn to set up a Home for the Andamanese with the aim of "civilising" them. While posted in the Andamans in 1858, he introduced 25 red avadavats into the wild in Port Blair, but the birds died out.

His first wife, Isabella née Neilson, whom he married in 1843 died aged 21 in 1847. In the following year on Tytler married Harriet Christina Earle (3 October 1828 – 24 November 1907), daughter of an officer in the 3rd Bengal Native Infantry. She had an interest in photography, which she learnt from Dr John Murray and Felice Beato. Shortly after the 1857 rebellion, Harriet who made a narrow escape had a son who was named Stanley Delhi-Force. Today Tytler and his wife are remembered mostly for their photographic work. Together they produced about 300 photographs, some of which formed large panoramas.

Harriet wrote several memoirs when she was between 75 and 77 years old (1903-6). These include "An Englishwoman in India; the memoirs of Harriet Tytler 1828-1858" first published in Chambers Journal in 1931 and a more detailed version published in 1986 by Oxford University Press.

Tytler was a keen naturalist, and took an interest particularly in the birds (many of his notes were communicated to Allan Octavian Hume) but also collected amphibians and reptiles. In one communication to Hume he wrote to claim priority on the discovery of the rufous-rumped grassbird:

I shot these birds at Dacca in 1852, and sent a description and a drawing of them to Mr. Blyth. They were named after my esteemed friend Jules Verreaux, of Paris. They are not uncommon at Dacca in grass-jungle. I think the bird Dr. Jerdon gives in his Birds of India as Graminicola bengalensis, No. 542, p. 177, vol. ii., is meant for this species. The genus Graminicola, under which he places this bird, appears to be a genus of Dr. Jerdon's own, for it is not in Gray's 'Genera and Subgenera of Birds in the British Museum,' printed in 1855. If it is the same bird as Dr. Jerdon's, then my name, which I communicated in 1851-52 not only to Mr. Blyth but also to Prince Bonaparte and M. Jules Verreaux, and which was published in my Fauna of Dacca, has, it seems to me, the priority.

Tytler lived for a while in Shimla at Bonnie Moon on Jakko Hill. Here he established a museum with collections of birds, shells, geological specimens, manuscripts and other exhibits from around India. Lord Mayo placed him in the Home department so as to run this public museum which was closed when he died in 1872. He had suffered for almost eight years and showed symptoms of arsenic poisoning. Harriet Tytler offered to gift the ornithological collections to Shimla but the collection which was packed into boxes eventually came into the possession of a Mr B. Bevan-Petman who passed it on to the Lahore Central Museum in 1917. The boxes were examined in 1918 by Hugh Whistler and only about 2500 specimens could be salvaged, the rest destroyed by moulds and beetles. Harriet also established North Stoneham house known as Mayo Industrial School in 1869 which was then bought in 1872 by a trust and made later into a school for girls. Tytler introduced several species of birds into the Andamans including common mynas, jungle mynas and peafowl.

Tytler's son, Major-General Sir Harry Tytler, followed his father into the Indian Army and was also a prominent naturalist.

== Eponyms ==
Species named for him include Tytler's mabuya, Eutropis tytleri, a skink; Rana tytleri and Hylarana tytleri, both frogs; Tytler's leaf warbler Phylloscopus tytleri; and an Asian subspecies of the barn swallow, Hirundo rustica tytleri.

Mount Harriet in the Andamans was named after his wife. It is now Mount Manipur.

== Writings ==
- Tytler RC. (1863). In Blyth E. (1899). Report of the Curator, Zoology Department. Jour. Asiatic Soc. Bengal 32: 88.
- Tytler RC. (1865). Description of a new species of Spizaetus. Proc. Asiatic Soc. Bengal 1865: 112.
- Tytler RC. (1865). Observations on a few species of geckos alive in the possession of the author. J. Asiatic Soc. Bengal 33 [1864]: 535–548.
- Tytler RC. (1868). Notes on the birds observed during a march from Simla to Mussoorie. Ibis 2 (4): 190–203.
- Tytler RC. (1854). Miscellaneous notes on the fauna of Dacca, including remarks made on the line of march from Barrackpore to that station. Ann. Mag. Nat. Hist. 2 (14): 168–177.

Government offices
Preceded by John Colpoys Haughton	Superintendent of Port Blair; 1862–1864	Succeeded by Barnett Ford
