= Harriet Tytler =

British photographer

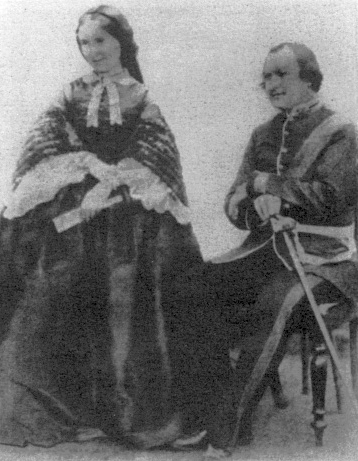
Harriet and Robert Tytler

Harriet Christina Tytler (née Earle; 3 October 1828 – 24 November 1907) was a British artist, writer, and a pioneer photographer. With her husband Robert Christopher Tytler, she created over 300 photographs. She is known for the documentation of monuments and the Siege of Delhi.

== Early life ==
Tytler was born in Sikraura, Bahraich, India, where her father was an officer in the 3rd Bengal Native Infantry.

In her autobiography, An Englishwoman in India, Harriet records in detail her experiences as a child in various military stations to which her father was transferred. In 1831 she was sent with two of her siblings to England, where she lived in Birmingham with her aunt and uncle. She returned to India at the age of seventeen. On 2 March 1848 she married Major Robert Christopher Tytler, whose wife had died fourteen months earlier. Their son, Major-General Sir Harry Tytler, followed his father into the Indian Army.

== Experiences in India ==
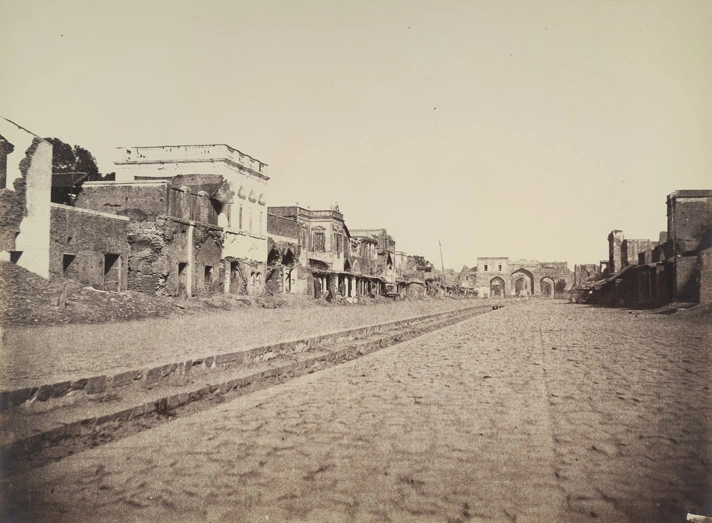
Tytler 's photograph "House in which the King was confined, a prisoner, ca. 1858–1859"; the British confined the "king of Delhi", Bahadur Shah II, in the house of Zeenat Mahal in Lal Kuan under the supervision of a European guard

The Tytlers were introduced to photography by Felix Beato and Dr John Murray of Agra. In May 1857 the couple were resident in the military cantonments outside Delhi, where Robert Tytler's regiment, the 38th Bengal Native Infantry was one of the first to mutiny during the Indian Rebellion of 1857. Because she was heavily pregnant, Harriet was allowed to stay on and was the only British woman present at the Siege of Delhi. She later gave birth in a donkey cart while escaping to safer areas. They named this third child Stanley Delhi-Force Tytler.

From 1862 to 1864 she lived in the Andaman Islands where her husband was posted as a Superintendent of the Ross Island Penal Colony, a penal settlement which was established mainly to house prisoners from the 1857 mutiny. The region around a 1,100 foot high hill in the South Andamans, which was named after her as Mount Harriet (now known as Mount Manipur), was cleared of forest by Tytler. The area is now protected as the Mount Harriet National Park. Tytler's tenure in the Andamans was short and they moved to Simla. In Simla, Harriet founded an Asiatic Christian Orphanage.

She died in Simla on 24 November 1907.

== Photography and artwork ==
Harriet's photographic work is mixed with those of her husband. Some pictures bear the "S.C.T." which have been identified as standing for her son Stanley. Many of her photographs are included in the collection of the National Gallery of Canada and the Harrison D. Horblit Collection of Early Photography. Although never having painted before she began work on a large canvas of 6x18 feet, to depict from memory the palace of the Emperor of Delhi as a cyclorama. She completed this work in 1872, following the death of Robert. Harriet kept a diary and her memoirs were published in 1986 as An Englishwoman in India. Her son Stanley grew up in Australia and became an artist of repute. He moved to British Columbia where he was a founding member of the B.C. Society of Fine Arts in 1909.
