= Harry Tytler =

Major-General Sir Harry Tytler KCB CMG CIE DSO
- Born: Harry Christopher Tytler; 26 September 1867; Dollar, Clackmannanshire, Scotland
- Died: 16 May 1939 (aged 71); Bromsash, Herefordshire, England
- Military career
- Allegiance: United Kingdom
- Branch: British Indian Army
- Service years: 1887–1928
- Rank: Major-General
- Conflicts: Sikkim Expedition; Lushai Expedition; Waziristan Expedition; First World War
- Awards: Knight Commander of the Order of the Bath; Companion of the Order of St Michael and St George; Companion of the Order of the Indian Empire

Major-General Sir Harry Christopher Tytler KCB CMG CIE DSO (26 September 1867 – 16 May 1939) was a British Indian Army officer who specialised in running lines of communication, and also an amateur naturalist.

Tytler was born in Dollar, Clackmannanshire, the son of Colonel Robert Christopher Tytler, a retired officer of the East India Company Army and his wife Harriet. He was educated at Mr Frank Townsend's School, Clifton, and the Royal Military College, Sandhurst. Leaving as Queen's (India) Cadet, he was commissioned a lieutenant in the Manchester Regiment in January 1886 and in November 1887 transferred to the Indian Army and joined the 17th Infantry. He was mentioned in despatches for his service in the Sikkim Expedition in 1888, and in the Lushai Expedition of 1890–1891 he commanded the small force which relieved Changsil. He was promoted captain in July 1897 and served in the Waziristan Expedition of 1901–1902. He was promoted major in January 1904.

During the First World War he served in the East Africa Campaign, first as deputy inspector-general of the lines of communication, then as assistant adjutant-general of the lines of communication, and finally as a column commander in the advance from Iringa and in the Lindi area. He was mentioned in despatches twice and awarded the Distinguished Service Order (DSO) in July 1918. He was promoted brevet colonel in February 1917 and substantive colonel in October 1917.

From 1918 to 1919 he served as inspector of communications with the Bushire Field Force in the Persian Campaign, for which he was appointed Companion of the Order of St Michael and St George (CMG) in January 1920 and again mentioned in despatches. In 1919, as a temporary brigadier-general, he served as inspector-general of the lines of communication in the Third Anglo-Afghan War, being mentioned in despatches for the fifth time and being appointed Companion of the Order of the Indian Empire (CIE) in August 1920, and then from October 1919 to May 1920, held the same post with the Waziristan Field Force, receiving his sixth mention and being appointed Companion of the Order of the Bath (CB) in June 1921. He was then given command of the Delhi Brigade back in India, retaining his temporary rank of brigadier-general and later colonel-commandant. He was promoted major-general in September 1920 and in 1921 was appointed deputy adjutant and quartermaster-general of the Northern Command. In 1924 he was appointed General Officer Commanding Burma Independent District, in which post he served until his retirement in June 1928. He was appointed Knight Commander of the Order of the Bath (KCB) in the 1927 New Year Honours.

Tytler married Florence Mai Read. They had no children. He took an interest in butterflies and birds and made large collections of eggs and butterflies. He communicated notes on Indian butterflies, especially from Assam, to the Journal of the Bombay Natural History Society. He retired to the small village of Bromsash, near Ross-on-Wye, Herefordshire, where he died in 1939.
