= Andaman and Nicobar Command =

Tri-services command of the Indian Armed Forces

Andaman and Nicobar Command (ANC)
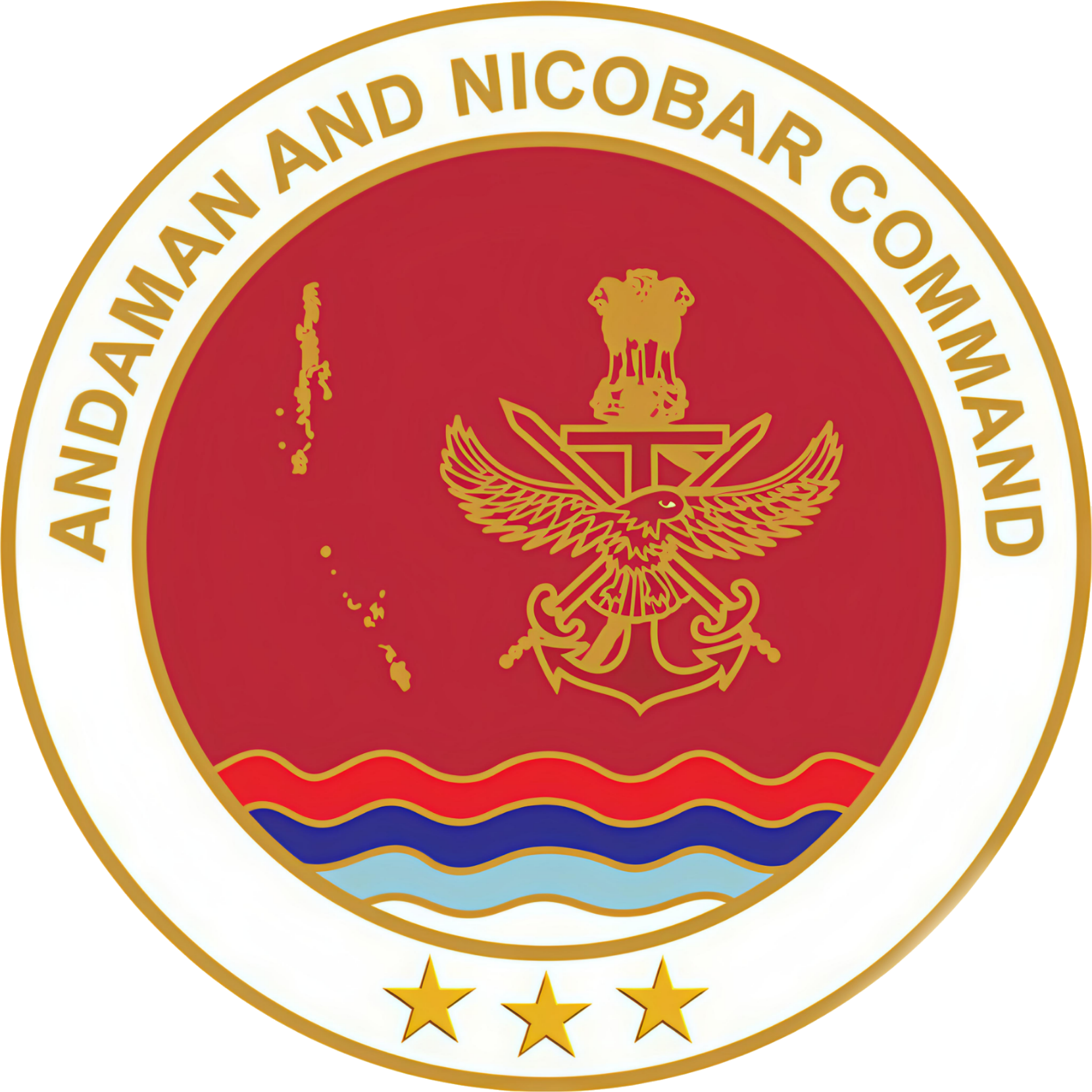
- Insignia of Andaman and Nicobar Command
- Founded: 1 October 2001 (25 years, 1 month ago)
- Country: India
- Branch: Indian Armed Forces
- Type: Integrated tri-services command
- Role: Theatre Command
- Headquarters: Port Blair
- Equipment: 81 mm & 120 mm mortars; 130 mm field guns; Igla MANPADS; L-70 Air Defence Guns; ZU-23-2 Air Defence Guns; S-75 Dvina; S-125 Neva/Pechora; Akash SAM systems; BMP-2 ICV; Multiple other equipments(Su-30Mki jets, other fighters, anti-ship missile systems, Indian Navy and Coast guard ships)

Commanders
- Commander-in-Chief: Vice Admiral Vineet McCarty
- Chief of Staff: Major General Ajay Feroze Shah

Aircraft flown
- Fighter: Sukhoi Su-30 MKI
- Cargo helicopter: Mi-17 V5
- Multirole helicopter: HAL Dhruv
- Utility helicopter: HAL Chetak
- Reconnaissance: Dornier 228
- Transport: C-130J Super Hercules; Antonov An-32

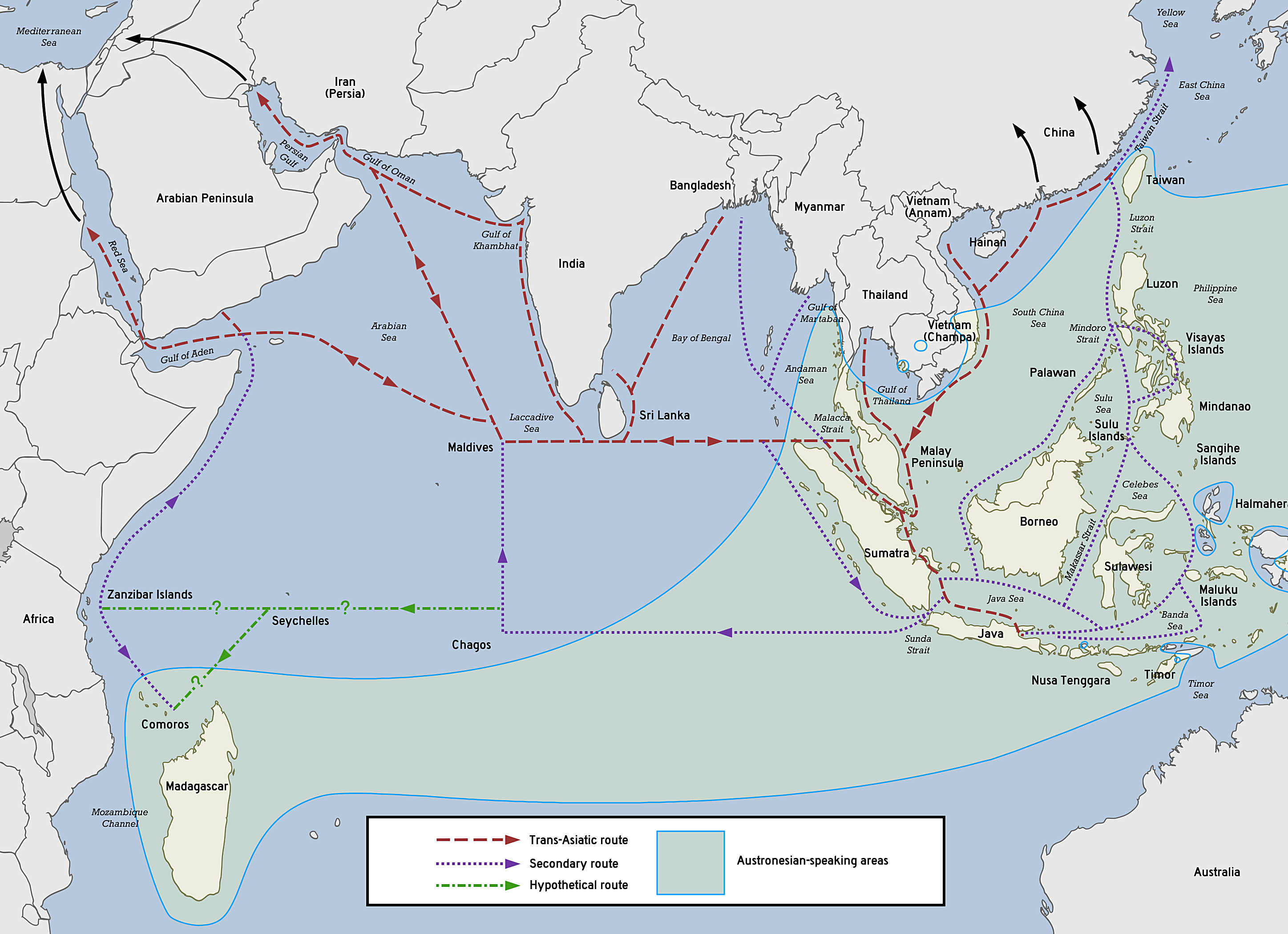
The Austronesian maritime trade network was the first trade routes in the Indian Ocean.

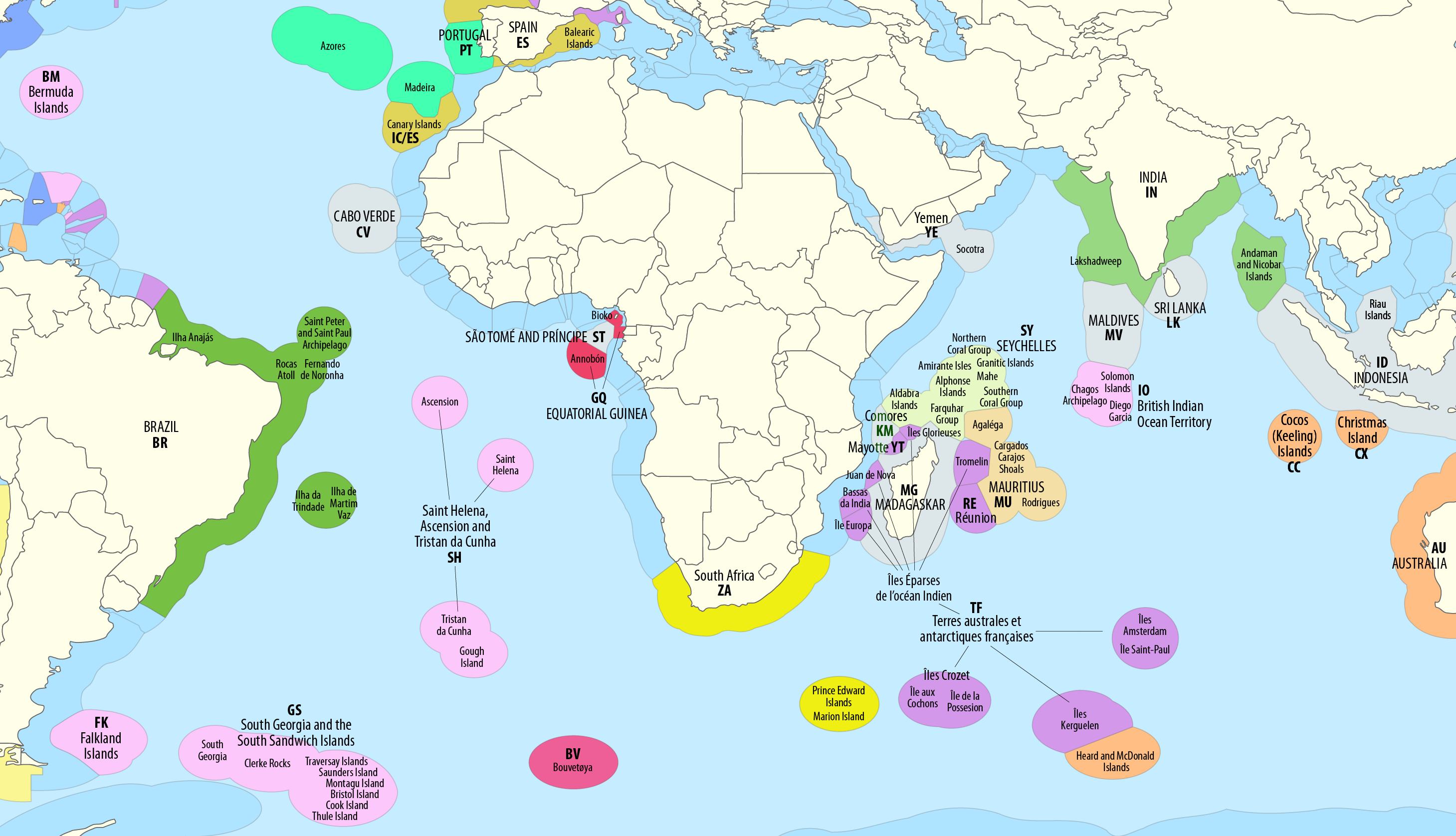
EEZs in the Atlantic and Indian Oceans.

The Andaman and Nicobar Command (ANC) is a integrated tri-services command of the Indian Armed Forces, based at Port Blair in the Andaman and Nicobar Islands, a Union Territory of India. It was created in 2001 to safeguard India's strategic interests in Southeast Asia and the Strait of Malacca by increasing rapid deployment of military assets in the region. It provides logistical and administrative support to naval ships which are sent on deployment to East Asia and the Pacific Ocean.

== Background ==
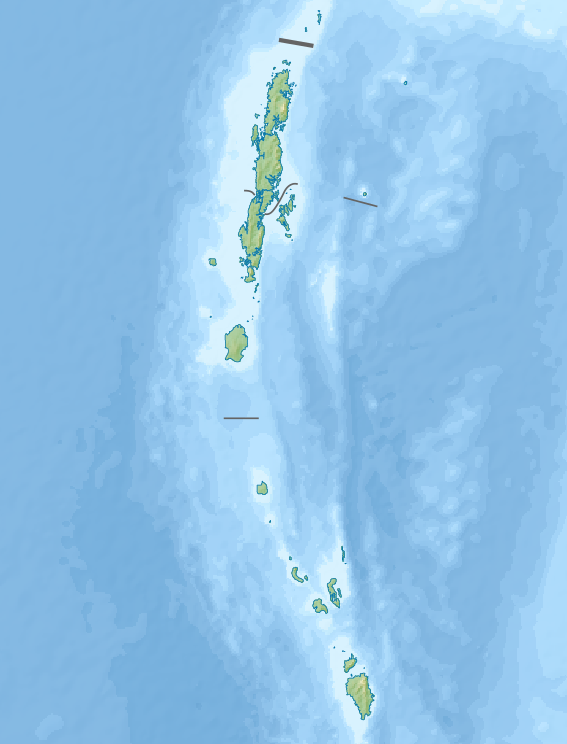
Andaman and Nicobar Islands map with various channels and straits in India's exclusive economic zone, including Six Degrees Channel and the busiest Ten Degrees Channel (Grand / Great Channel)

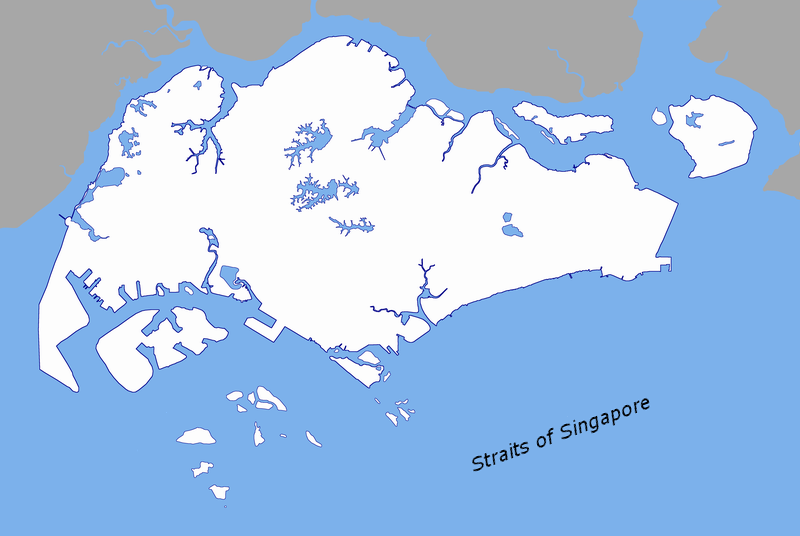
Singapore Strait - a critical chokepoint: connects to South China Sea where several nations have conflicting claims over various islands.

Sunda Strait, shallowest route unfit for larger commercial vessels.

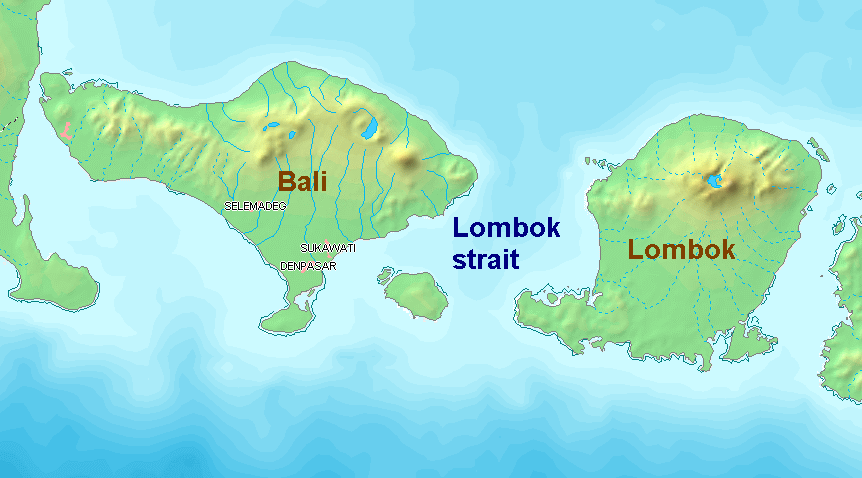
Lombok Strait, alternative less popular and longer route in the influence zone of Australia's Cocos Keeling Island military base.

=== Strategic Importance of ANC ===
According to the International Hydrographic Organization's (IHO) definitions of the Bay of Bengal and Andaman Sea, the Andaman and Nicobar Islands (A&N) fall on the maritime boundary of these two. Indian exclusive economic zone (EEZ) to the north and west of A&N falls within the Bay of Bengal and to east of A&N falls within the Andaman Sea. Various straits (narrow passages in the sea, also called the channels) in A&N are officially part of Andaman Sea, rather than the Bay of Bengal, connect the two and shipping routes beyond. The Ten Degree Channel (also called Great or Grand Channel) within India's EEZ is world's busiest shipping trade route which also connects to the very narrow and contiguous Strait of Malacca and the Singapore Strait. This route is considered world's biggest strategic choke point. India and allies could potentially impose a blockade in case of dispute with China whose economy significantly depends on the export trade through this route. Safety, security and freedom of navigation in this area are vital for the global economy. This area is part of the much larger Indian Ocean region through which 90% of the world's trade passes, which in turn is part of the larger Indo-Pacific region which hosts most of the global maritime trading activity.

==== Control over vital global shipping route ====
The zone of influence of the ANC has deep significance in terms of history, culture, religion, economy and trade, EEZs, political and international relations, national security, safety and freedom of navigation of power projection of not only India but also other nations of South Asia and Southeast Asia as well as the $3 trillion in international trade which passes through the south Andaman Sea. ANC influence over the gateway to the Far East includes the Six Degree Channel and the Ten Degree Channel in the Indian EEZ in the Bay of Bengal, which is connected to the Strait of Malacca. These are crossed by over 94,000 merchant ships every year carrying world's 40% freight trade to and from China, South Korea and Japan. Andaman and Nicobar Islands account for 0.2% of India's land and 30% of its exclusive economic zone. Sea lines of communication (SLOC) carry more than 90% of global trade. In Indo-Pacific Asia, US$5 trillion annual shipping trade passes through the SLOC and choke points of Southeast Asia and South China Sea (SCS). 80% of the global trade passes through Indian Ocean SLOC in oil and natural gas critical for advanced economies.

==== Control over critical shipping chokepoints ====
Since this area in Indian EEZ and ANC influence zone connects Indian Ocean with South China Sea and Pacific Ocean, the safety of Malacca strait is paramount to the economies of numerous countries. Both USA and Russia support the freedom of navigation. Australia's "2013 Defence White Paper" emphasises importance of security of Indian Ocean SLOC trade which has surpassed Atlantic and Pacific oceans trade. However, China's activities in this region continues cause concern among several nations. Against the concern shown by United States, Japan and several other nations, China continues to claim most of South China Sea. China has militarized a reclaimed tiny islet in South China Sea which is also claimed by other nations. This has led to China's conflict with several Southeast Asian nations, including Philippines and Vietnam. In March 2020, Indian Navy discovered 12 underwater drones deployed by China in Indian Ocean for gathering oceanographic naval intelligence aimed at submarine warfare. China has allegedly done the similar underwater drone operation in Pacific Ocean as well.

All 3 major global sea trade routes to Indian Ocean, from Cape of Good Hope and Gulf of Aden or Straits of Hormuz, converge at narrow Six Degree Channel in Indian EEZ resulting in high shipping density, which enhances India's ability to exert influence over the vulnerability and protection of this maritime trade route. Shallow, congested and narrow archipelagic chokepoints in the influence zone of ANC are Straits of Malacca and Lombok Strait to and from South China Sea. Malaca strait is the busiest and most important chokepoint. All trade vessels from Malacca Strait must pass through most important SLOC chokepoint located within India's Anadaman Nicobar EEZ, i.e. Six Degree Channel south of Anadaman and Nicobar Islands. Other two less frequently used channels within Indian EEZ are the Preparis Channel in north and the Ten Degree Channel between the Andaman and Nicobar island groups. Alternative to the shorter and busiest route through Malaca Strait and Six Degree Channel in Indian EEZ, guarded by Indian Military Base in Andaman and Nicobar Islands, is Sunda and Lombok Straits chokepoints in Indonesia in the influence zone of Cocos (Keeling) Islands Australian Military Base. Together, these chokepoints are the entry and exit points between Indian and Pacific Oceans, all of which lie within combined India-Australia military influence zone. This provides geostrategic advantage to Indian and Australian militaries [part of QUAD along with USA and Japan] for joint anti-signal intelligence gathering, submarine tracking and warfare missions in Indian and Pacific Oceans.

India is bolstering military capabilities in Andaman and Nicobar Islands by placing ship-based nuclear missile system as deterrence and a fleet of naval warships with Landing Platform Docks (LPDs) by 2020.

==== QUAD force multiplier ====
The Quadrilateral Security Dialogue (QUAD), a strategic dialogue between Australia, India, Japan and USA, is aimed at countering the risk posed to the trade and security of navigation and nations in and around this region. QUAD nations continue to hold regular military exercise in the ANC influence area, such as Exercise Malabar (see also US-Philippines Annual Balikatan Exercise).

Aimed at countering China's activities in Indo-Pacific, to ensure "free, open, inclusive and rules-based Indo-Pacific region ... and maintaining open, safe and efficient sea lanes for transportation and communication", India and Australia signed a military treaty for Mutual Logistics Support and interoperability for reciprocal access to military bases. India has a similar treaty with the U.S., while a similar treaty with remaining member of QUAD, Japan, is awaited. India, which also has MoU with USA and Japan for encrypted military communications, is likely to sign similar MoU with Australia. India, USA and Japan have been undertaking regular trilateral maritime exercises (Exercise Malabar), which Australia is also expected to join. India-Australia Military Pact paves the way for extending their regional reach through coordinated power projection and mutual use of military facilities in India's Andaman and Nicobar Islands and Australia's Cocos Island. Australia, which already has RAAF base at Cocos Islands, uses it for surveillance and to monitor the area extending between Andaman and Nicobar Islands in the north to Cocos Islands in south.

India-Singapore Bilateral Agreement for Navy Cooperation also provides Indian Navy ships access to Singapore's Changi Naval Base, logistical support and refuelling rights. This allows India, which has similar agreements with Vietnam, Japan, France, Australia and the United States, to counter China's "string of pearls" with "Necklace of Diamonds" ports: Changi Naval Base in Singapore, Chabahar Port in Iran, the Assumption Island in Seychelles, and Duqm Port in Oman.

==== Historic and contemporary geostrategic soft and hard power ====
Historic Indian cultural influence: Indianized Hindu-Buddhist kingdoms within Greater India, which also included Andaman and Nicobar as an important staging area were spread across Indonesia and Malaysia (Srivijaya, Majapahit, Gangga Negara, Kalingga, Kutai, Singhasari, Tarumanagara and Pan Pan), Malaysia (Langkasuka), Thailand (Dvaravati), Indochina (Champa, Funan, and Chenla), and Myanmar (Pagan).

The area in and around ANC influence zone is part of historic Greater India which was dotted with numerous Indianised Hindu-Buddhist kingdoms. Since 45-47 CE, several ancient Indian empires, such as the Chola, Chalukya, Kalinga [modern Odisha] and Andra traded and exerted Indian cultural influence over Southeast Asia through the Malacca Strait. From the 16th to 20th century, colonial western powers fought against each other for control of this maritime route, trade and the region.

The 750-km long Andaman and Nicobar archipelago consists of a chain of 572 islands. It is located about 1200 km from mainland India, merely 40 km from Myanmar, 160 km from Indonesia and 550 km from Thailand. India's Landfall Island is 40 km from Myanmar's Coco Islands. India's southernmost territory Indira Point is 135 km north of Indonesia's northernmost territory Rondo Island. India's Tillangchong island (north of Camorta Island in Nicobar) is just 440 km from Thailand's Ko Huyong (Similan Islands group). India's Campbell Bay on Great Nicobar Island is 488 km from Thailand's Ko Racha (Racha Noi Island in Phuket Province). Campbell Bay is also 630 km from Malaysia's nearest island ,Langkawi.

==== Port-development led encirclement ====
To enhance regional connectivity, trade, safety, security, and to protect the Strait of Malacca channel, India is developing several strategic ports in the influence zone of ANC, namely the Port of Chittagong in Bangladesh with rail connectivity to Tripura, Port of Mongla in Bangladesh, Sittwe Port as part of the Kaladan Multi-Modal Transit Transport Project in Myanmar and Sabang deepsea port under the India–Indonesia strategic military and economic partnership. Along with India's Sagar Mala projects aimed at developing several coastal ports in India, India is also considering developing more ports in the influence zone of ANC, such as the Dawei Port Project.

==== Protection of exclusive economic zone ====
The region suffers from the problem of piracy. ANC is guarantor of the safety and security of exclusive economic zone of India, which also lies in the vicinity of EEZs of several other nations including Indonesia, Malaysia, Thailand, Myanmar, Bangladesh, Maldives and Sri Lanka.

=== History of ANC ===
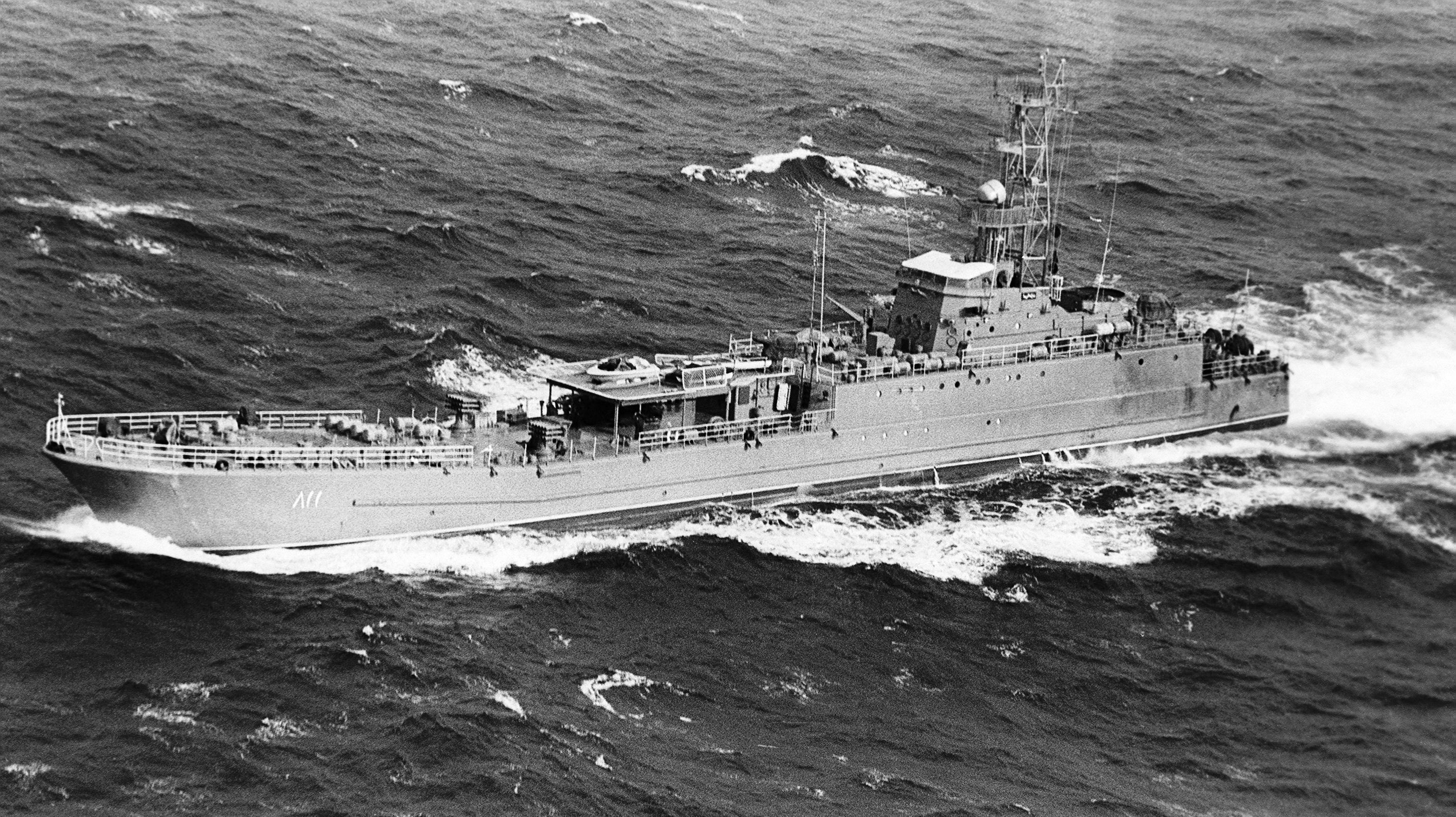
Polnocny-class landing ship

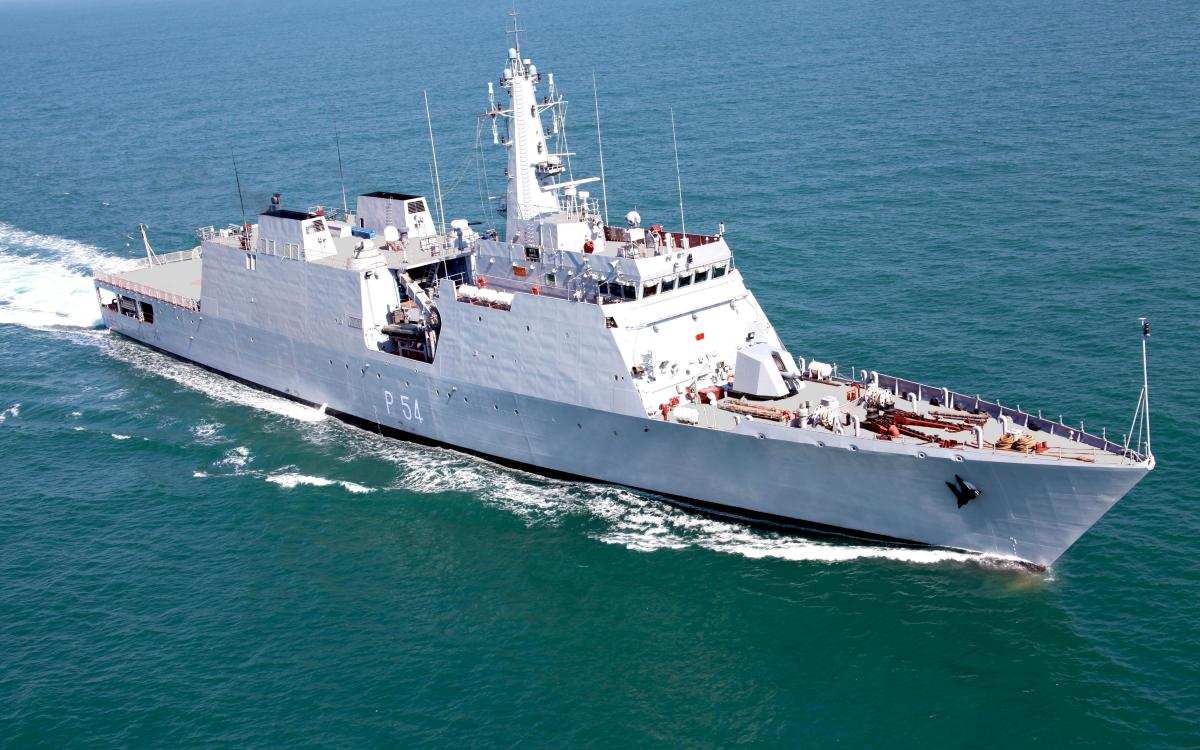
INS Saryu, one of the two Saryu-class patrol vessels home-ported at INS Jarawa, Port Blair, under the A&N Command.

==== Inception and slow expansion ====
The island chain had remained underdeveloped because of multiple factors including lack of inter-island connectivity, distance from the Indian mainland and high-cost of building materials. In the 1960s, the Indian security establishment responded to the increased security threats and established a unified Fortress Andaman and Nicobar (FORTAN) under the command of a Vice Admiral as the Fortress Commander. The Indian Army initially placed a battalion and subsequently the 108 Mountain Brigade, in 1990, under the command of the Fortress Commander. The Indian Air Force chose to keep its units under one of its mainland commands and maintained a liaison with the FORTAN headquarters. 37 Wing of the Indian Air Force was raised at AFS Car Nicobar in 1993.

There was a consideration to replace Fortress Commander, Andaman and Nicobar Islands (FORTAN) with a Far Eastern Naval Command (FENC). The previous plan to set up FENC was set in motion in 1995 following a closed-door meeting in Washington between then Prime Minister of India, P. V. Narasimha Rao, and then US president, Bill Clinton. At the time, Pentagon officials made a formal request to the United Front coalition government in New Delhi to open a base in the islands.

==== Post Kargil war rapid capabilities expansion ====
In 1999, after the Kargil War, the Andaman and Nicobar Islands received more attention. The Group of Ministers (GoM) report on Reforming the National Security System recommended the replacement of the FORTAN, under the Indian Navy, with a Joint Andaman and Nicobar Command which will control the assets of the tri-services and the Coast Guard on the islands. The GoM had recommended that the commander of this joint command would report to the proposed Chief of Defence Staff (CDS). The Andaman and Nicobar Command was in place by the end of September 2001 and Vice Admiral (later Admiral and CNS) Arun Prakash was the first commander-in-chief, Andaman and Nicobar Command (CINCAN). A joint command at the Andaman and Nicobar Islands would help in to prevent smuggling, piracy, drug and gun trafficking, poaching and illegal immigration in the region and especially in the Malacca Strait. The command would also be in a position to assist the multinational Malacca Straits Security Initiative, aimed at curbing threats in the Malacca Straits. An Indian command in the islands could also counter any future threat from China, which was rumoured to have set up a surveillance post in Myanmar's Coco Islands, 40 km off the northern tip of the Andamans, but this was proved incorrect.

== Summary of bases and capabilities ==
=== Major bases ===
The following are the air and naval bases under the A&N command, from north to south, some of which are being upgraded under 2027 roll-on plan. By 2020, India is placing ship-based nuclear missile system, fleet of naval warships and Landing Platform Docks (LPDs). Listed north to south.

| Base | Branch | Location | Airport | Deepsea port | Distance | Role | Upgrade |
|---|---|---|---|---|---|---|---|
| 1. Kalaikunda AFS | Indian Air Force | Kharagpur (West Bengal) | Yes (10,000 feet (3.0 km)) | No (inland) | 1200 km to INS Kohassa | Air Force Base | See also Coco Islands of Myanmar. |
| 2. INS Kohassa | Indian Navy | Shibpur village (Diglipur tehsil, North Andaman Island) | Yes (10,000 feet (3.0 km)) | Aerial Bay jetty | 1200 km from Kalaikunda AFS | Naval Air Station with night landing facilities | New ammunition dumps and capacity upgrade for fighter jets and bigger planes like long-range maritime reconnaissance Boeing P-8I and anti-submarine aircraft. |
| 3. INS Utkrosh | Indian Navy | Port Blair (South Andaman Island) | Yes (10,000 feet (3.0 km)) | INS Jarawa jetty | 180 km from INS Kohassa | Joint Naval and Air Force Base at Veer Savarkar International Airport | Naval ammunition depot and bigger reinforced command with extended jetties for aircraft carriers and large warships. |
| 4. INS Jarawa | Indian Navy | Port Blair (South Andaman Island) | No (see INS Utkrosh below) | Jetty | 180 km from INS Kohassa | Logistics and Administrative support naval base with jetty | |
| 5. Car Nicobar AFS | Indian Air Force | Car Nicobar | Yes (10,000 feet (3.0 km)) | Jetty | 275 km from INS Utkrosh | Air Force Base | Capacity upgrade to hold fighter squadrons for more than month. |
| 6. INS Kardip | Indian Navy | Kamorta (Kamorta Island) | No | Jetty (upgraded to deepsea port for warships) | 144 km from Car Nicobar AFS | Amphibious warfare and staging base | |
| 7. INS Baaz | Indian Navy | Campbell Bay (Great Nicobar Island) | Yes (10,000 feet (3.0 km)) | Jetty (upgraded to deepsea port for warships, installation of a robust radar network. | 130 km from INS Kardip | Naval Air Station with night landing facilities | New ammunition dump and relocating fighter jets and bigger planes such as long-range maritime reconnaissance Boeing P-8I and anti-submarine aircraft. See also Sabang Port in Indonesia. |

=== Military hospitals ===
Listed north to south:

- INHS Nivarini at Chilimatta (near Diglipur) to support the northern fleet deployments working out of INS Kohassa. It was established to project medical readiness into the northernmost reaches of the archipelago, the hospital provides critical primary and secondary healthcare support to forward-deployed forces. Its primary operational mandate is to provide dedicated medical backing to the expanding northern fleet deployments and maritime surveillance operations operating out of the adjacent naval air station, INS Kohassa. INHS Nivarini has modern surgical suites, trauma stabilization units, and enhanced pharmaceutical storage.
- INS Dhanvantari at Port Blair. It functions as the command's primary medical coordination hub, managing complex casualty evacuations from remote island outposts and warships operating across the Bay of Bengal. It is equipped with advanced diagnostic imaging systems, hyperbaric oxygen chambers to treat deep-sea diving casualties, and expanded intensive care units (ICUs) capable of handling large-scale maritime emergencies. Additionally, its emergency medical evacuation infrastructure is structurally integrated with nearby transit grids, allowing seamless transfer of critical patients arriving via the naval air station at INS Utkrosh or the Port Blair harbour.

=== Ship repair ===
Floating Dock Navy FDN1 & FDN2 at INS Jarawa (Port Blair) for ship repairs: Operated continuously by the ANC, these are massive floating dry-docks capable of lifting warships and assets up to 40,000 tonnes. They ensure the fleet does not have to sail 1,200 km back to the Indian mainland for critical hull maintenance or battle damage repairs.

=== Drones ===
==== UAV for air warfare and surveillance ====
INS Baaz and INS Utkrosh act as launchpads for long-endurance UAVs. Indigenous Indian armed drones and Israeli-origin Heron UAVs fly persistent circuits, feeding real-time video telemetry directly back to the joint command center.

==== Underwater drones for warfare and surveillance ====
The Indian Navy, in close collaboration with the Defence Research and Development Organisation (DRDO), is executing an aggressive transition from basic underwater survey equipment to combat-ready Autonomous underwater vehicle (AUVs, such as Maya AUV India, AUV-150, etc) and Extra-Large Unmanned Undersea Vehicles (XLUUVs). Following successful prototype trials, the Indian Navy has identified requirement for 12 XLUUV units for Intelligence, Surveillance and Reconnaissance (ISR), Anti-submarine warfare (ASW), mine countermeasures, and integration with advanced loitering swarm drones with 300 tons gross weight, 50 meters length x 5 meters width x meters height and endurance of 45 days of continuous autonomous operation with highly modular payload allowing variable weapons, sensors, and ULUAV deployments.

=== Radar and surveillance network ===
- Naval Communication Network (NCN) electronic backbone: The entire archipelago is unified via specialized NCN Centres. This dedicated military network uses secure, jam-resistant satellite links and undersea optical fiber cables to connect the mainland with the island bases.
- Integrated Coastal Surveillance System (ICSS) - chain of Static Sensor Radar Stations: As part of India's Coastal Radar Network Phase 2 project overseen by Bharat Electronics Limited (BEL), dedicated high-frequency radar stations operate continuously across the island chain. They form a "leak-proof" electronic fence that detects surface vessels and low-flying aircraft trying to slip past the islands.
- Precision approach radar (PAR): Upgraded PAR and advanced surveillance arrays have been permanently integrated at INS Utkrosh (Port Blair) to track and coordinate multiple high-speed military aircraft landing under zero-visibility or hostile weather conditions.
- Satellite mapping by National Remote Sensing Centre (NRSC): The Ministry of Home Affairs leverages the NRSC to process continuous, high-resolution satellite feeds. This data monitors the activity of foreign surveillance, research, and hydrographic tracking ships lurking around the 55 inhabited and hundreds of uninhabited islands.
- Submarine tracking for underwater sound surveillance: While highly classified, India operates a network of passive underwater sonar arrays (hydrophones) laid across the seabed near the Six-Degree Channel and the Malacca Strait entrances. These sensors capture the acoustic signatures of foreign submarines trying to enter the Indian Ocean from the South China Sea, sending warnings to anti-submarine warfare units stationed at the airbases.
- Real-Time Data Sharing, eg. Information Management and Analysis Centre (IMAC Gurugram) and Indian National Centre for Ocean Information Services (INCOIS Hydrabad): If a radar station on Kamorta Island detects an unidentified vessel, the telemetry is immediately shared with a roaming Boeing P-8I Poseidon aircraft, an Air Force Sukhoi Su-30MKI flight, and the command center at Port Blair simultaneously, allowing an immediate response.

== Force structure ==
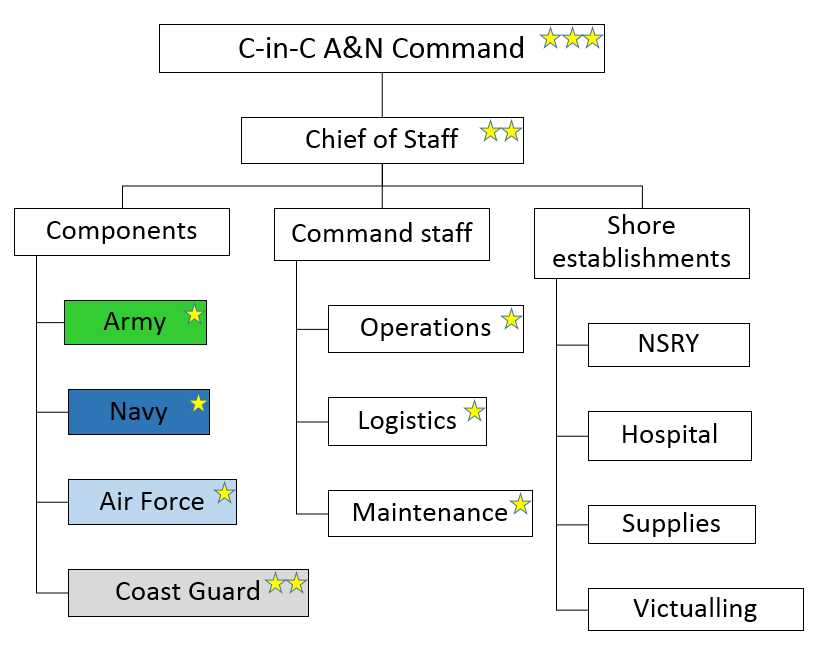
Structure of the Andaman and Nicobar Command. The stars in the boxes indicate star officer rank.

=== Commander-in-Chief, Andaman and Nicobar Command ===
The Andaman and Nicobar Command is commanded by a three-star officer (rank of Lieutenant General of the Indian Army or equivalent) who reports directly to the chief of Defence Staff (CDS) in New Delhi. The chief of staff of the command is a two-star officer; each component (sea, land, air) is commanded by a one-star officer. The command is currently headed by Vice Admiral Vineet McCarty, who took command on 1 June 2026 as the 20th CINCAN.

=== Chief of staff ===
The following is a list of chiefs of staff of the A&N command.

| No | Name | Branch | Appointment Date | Left office | References |
|---|---|---|---|---|---|
| 1 | Major General K. B. Kapoor VSM | Indian Army | 12 December 2001 | 14 October 2003 | |
| 2 | Rear Admiral R. Kala NM | Indian Navy | 15 October 2003 | 24 April 2005 | |
| 3 | Rear Admiral S. Chakraborty VSM | Indian Navy | 25 April 2005 | 6 June 2005 | |
| 4 | Air Vice Marshal K. K. Nohwar VM | Indian Air Force | 7 June 2005 | 7 December 2006 | |
| 5 | Rear Admiral P. K. Nair | Indian Navy | 8 December 2006 | 30 November 2008 | |
| 6 | Major General A. K. Chaturvedi | Indian Army | 1 December 2008 | 26 April 2010 | |
| 7 | Major General N. P. Padhi | Indian Army | 27 April 2010 | 6 May 2011 | |
| 8 | Rear Admiral Karambir Singh | Indian Navy | 7 May 2011 | 28 May 2012 | |
| 9 | Rear Admiral Sudhir Pillai NM | Indian Navy | 28 May 2012 | 4 July 2014 | |
| 10 | Major General C. E. Fernandes SM | Indian Army | 5 July 2014 | 14 October 2014 | |
| 11 | Major General P. K. Siwach VSM | Indian Army | 3 November 2014 | 30 March 2016 | |
| 12 | Major General P. S. Saj | Indian Army | 18 April 2016 | 4 May 2018 | |
| 13 | Major General Beji Mathews | Indian Army | 5 May 2018 | 4 March 2020 | |
| 14 | Rear Admiral Suraj Berry AVSM, NM, VSM | Indian Navy | 5 March 2020 | 17 July 2021 | |
| 15 | Rear Admiral Dalbir Singh Gujral NM | Indian Navy | 18 July 2021 | 30 November 2022 | |
| 16 | Rear Admiral Sandeep Sandhu NM | Indian Navy | 1 December 2022 | 30 June 2024 | |
| 17 | Rear Admiral Biplab Hota VSM | Indian Navy | 1 July 2024 | 6 January 2026 | |
| 18 | Major General Ajay Feroze Shah | Indian Army | 7 January 2026 | Incumbent | |

Number of COS by Branch of Service
| Branch | Count |
| Indian Army | 8 |
| Indian Navy | 9 |
| Indian Air Force | 1 |

=== Assets ===
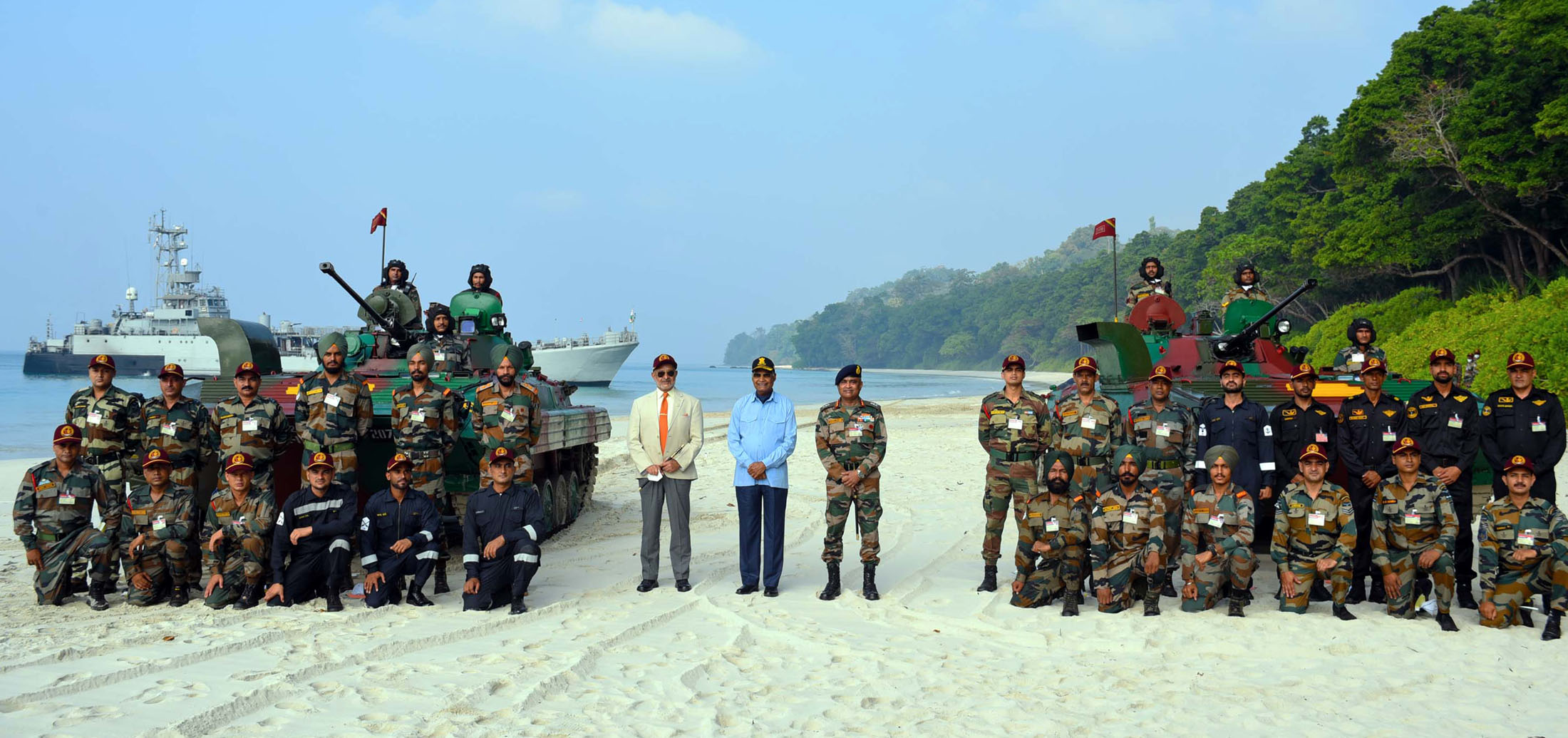
President Ram Nath Kovind, with Lt Gov Adm D. K. Joshi (Retd.) and CINCAN Lt Gen Manoj Pande, at the Joint Services Operational Demonstration by the Integral combat platforms and forces of Andaman and Nicobar Command, at Radhanagar beach, Swaraj Dweep, Andaman and Nicobar in February 2021.

The Naval Component is the largest component and is commanded by a Commodore (one star officer). Naval vessels in the component include missile corvettes, amphibious warfare vessels, landing crafts, offshore patrol vessels (OPV) and fast attack crafts (FAC). INS Karmuk and INS Kulish, two Kora-class corvettes were re-based to Port Blair from Eastern Naval Command on 6 April 2016 and 21 December 2017 respectively. INS Saryu and INS Sumedha, two Saryu-class patrol vessels, have been based at Port Blair since 2013. In addition, four Bangaram-class patrol vessels, two Car Nicobar-class patrol vessels, one Trinkat-class patrol vessel, three Kumbhir-class tank landing ships, one Shardul-class tank landing ship, eight Mk. IV LCUs and the SDB Mk.3 large patrol craft are also deployed under the naval component. INAS 318 with Dornier 228 and Flight 321 are deployed at INS Utkrosh.

The 108 Infantry Brigade of the Indian Army, comprising three battalions, which includes the 21 Bihar, is deployed at Birchgunj in Port Blair under the army component. A Territorial Army battalion is also deployed at Campbell Bay. Indian Airforce's 15 FBSU (forward base support units), comprising 153 Squadron and 4 Maritime Element, are deployed at Port Blair. 37 Air Wing, comprising Helicopters from 122 squadron and Dornier 228 from 151 squadron, are deployed at AFS Car Nicobar.

The Andaman & Nicobar region of the Indian Coast Guard also falls under the purview of the command with RHQ and 745 squadron at Port Blair, DHQ 9 at Diglipur and DHQ 10 at Campbell Bay. In July 2012, the navy commissioned INS Baaz, a naval air station which is located 300 nautical miles south of Port Blair and is the southernmost air station of the Indian Armed Forces. INS Jarawa at Phoenix Bay in Port Blair is the support base for the ships and the main naval and air force establishment in Port Blair.

=== Modernization ===
In 2013, the navy proposed to station a nuclear submarine and a landing deck platform at the islands in the future, and the Indian Air Force has decided to station Sukhoi Su-30MKI fighters on the islands along with increasing the number of operational airfields. The Air Force also maintains an Air Defense Wing fielding a squadron of S-75 Dvina Long-Range SAMs and a squadron of S-125 Neva/Pechora Medium-range SAMs. The army's single brigade is planned to be increased by deploying a division size force (about 15,000 troops) under the command. In 2015, it was reported that under the overall "island development plan", which includes a new naval air station at Campbell Bay, the existing runways at Campbell Bay and Shibpur are to be extended, while more airstrips are proposed in the archipelago and more operational turn-around bases. The number of naval vessels based in the island chain will increase to 32 before 2022. In addition, Japanese war bunkers, constructed during Japanese occupation of the Andaman and Nicobar islands during the World War II, will be revived to bolster security.

== Operations ==
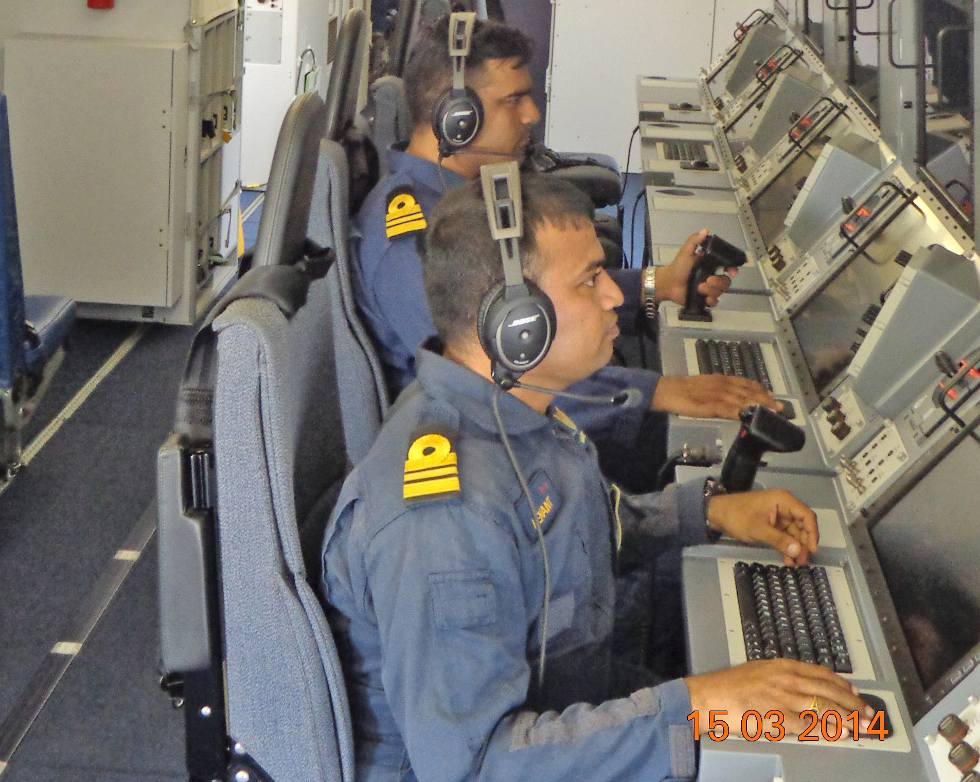
Operators on Navy's Boeing P-8I search for Malaysia Airlines Flight 370.

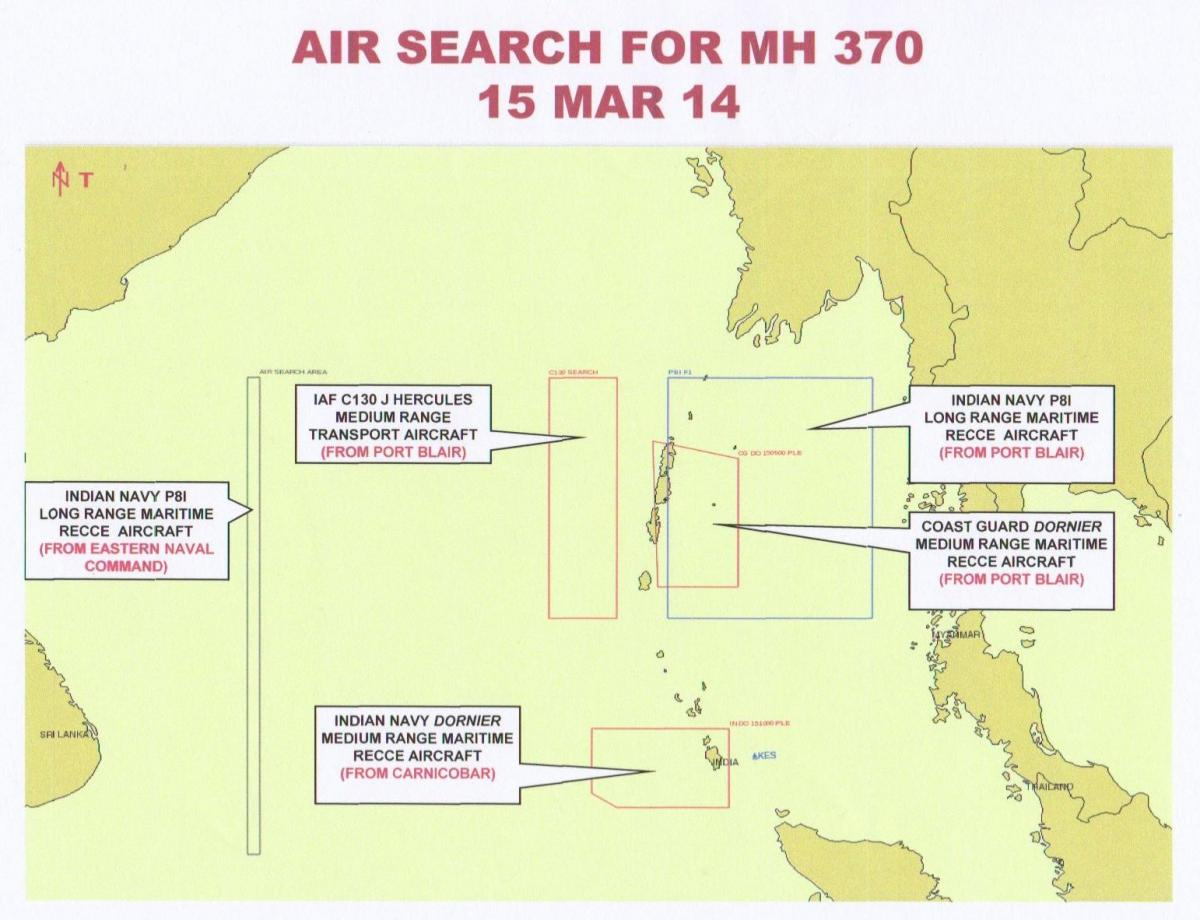
India's search areas for Malaysia Airlines Flight 370.

=== Unilateral security and anti-piracy initiatives ===
The Andaman and Nicobar Command manages Indian engagement with regional navies of Southeast Asia. It conducts bi-annual coordinated patrols (CORPATs) with the navies of Thailand and Indonesia, the annual SIMBEX maritime exercises with Singapore, and the biennial Milan multilateral naval exercises. The Command also patrols India's exclusive economic zone to suppress gun running, narcotics smuggling, piracy, and poaching, and conducts maritime surveillance, humanitarian assistance and disaster relief.

=== Unilateral war exercises ===
In April 2016, the command conducted an amphibious exercise called 'Jal Prahar' to check readiness and to ensure functional integrity of all three services on the islands. Ships, aircraft and troops along with tanks from both the Eastern Naval Command and Andaman & Nicobar Command participated in the exercise. Defence of Andaman & Nicobar Islands Exercise (DANX-17) was conducted during 20–24 November 2017. Additional forces including Jaguar fighters, 50th Parachute Brigade, missile frigates and C-130 Hercules heavy lift aircraft also participated in the exercise. The purpose of the exercise was to practice the defence of the island chain and recapturing islands.

=== Search for Malaysia Airlines Flight 370 ===
For the effort to search for Malaysia Airlines Flight 370, the commander-in-chief Andaman and Nicobar Command was nominated as the Overall Force Commander of the Indian forces. Surface and airborne assets from the Andaman and Nicobar Command took part in the effort. The ANC command contributed navy ships INS Saryu, INS Kesari and INS Kumbhir, and coast guard vessels ICGS Kanaklata Baruah, ICGS Bhikaji Cama and ICGS Sagar. Eastern Naval Command (ENC) also contributed Shivalik-class frigates INS Satpura and INS Sahyadri, and patrol vessel INS Batti Malv. For aerial maritime surveillance, the ANC command dedicated two navy Boeing P-8I Neptunes, coast guard Dornier 228, and Indian Air Force C-130J Super Hercules from Port Blair, and navy Dornier 228 from Car Nicobar. along with air force Mil Mi-17 from ENC.

== See also ==
Integrated entities

- Defence Planning Committee, tri-services command at policy level with NSA as its chief
- Chief of Defence Staff (India), professional head of the Indian Armed Forces
- Integrated Defence Staff, tri-services command at strategic level composed of MoD, MEA and tri-services staff
- Indian Armed Forces Tri-Service Commands
  - Northern Theatre Command (India)
  - Western Theatre Command (India)
  - Maritime Theatre Command
  - Air Defence Command (India)
  - Strategic Forces Command
    - Indian Nuclear Command Authority
  - Defence Cyber Agency
  - Defence Space Agency
  - Special Operations Division

Assets

- List of Indian Air Force stations
- List of Indian Navy bases
- List of active Indian Navy ships
- India's overseas military bases

General concepts

- Joint warfare, general concept
- Credible minimum deterrence
- List of cyber warfare forces of other nations
