= Port Blair Islands =

Sri Vijaya Puram Islands
- Location within Andaman and Nicobar Islands

Geography
- Location: Bay of Bengal
- Coordinates: 11.688°N 92.724°E
- Archipelago: Andaman Islands
- Adjacent to: Indian Ocean
- Total islands: 6
- Major islands: Chatham Island; Garacharma Island; Ross Island; Snake Island
- Area: 1.138 km^{2} (0.439 sq mi)
- Highest elevation: 0 m (0 ft)

Administration
- India
- District: South Andaman
- Island group: Andaman Islands
- Island sub-group: Great Andaman
- Tehsil: Sri Vijaya Puram
- Largest settlement: INS Jarawa

Demographics
- Population: 11 (2011)
- Pop. density: 9.6/km^{2} (24.9/sq mi)
- Ethnic groups: Hindu, Andamanese

Additional information
- Time zone: IST (UTC+5:30)
- PIN: 744101
- Telephone code: 031927
- ISO code: IN-AN-00
- Official website: www.and.nic.in
- Literacy: 84.4%
- Avg. summer temperature: 30.2 °C (86.4 °F)
- Avg. winter temperature: 23.0 °C (73.4 °F)
- Sex ratio: 1.2♂/♀
- Census Code: 35.639.0004
- Official Languages: Hindi, English

Port Blair Islands are a group of islands situated in the sound off of Port Blair, the capital of the Andaman Islands. They belong to the South Andaman administrative district, part of the Indian union territory of Andaman and Nicobar Islands.

== Geography ==
The islands are located on North Bay, Navy Bay, Flat Bay, Garacharma Bay, and the vicinity of Ross Island.

== Administration ==
Politically, Sri Vijaya Puram Islands are part of Port Blair Taluk.

== Demographics ==
There are living quarters for the JPC manager at Chatham Island and several navy officers at the INS Jarawa quarters at Netaji Subhas Chandra Bose Island.

== See also ==
- Chatham Saw Mill
