= INS Kohassa =

- IATA: none; ICAO: VODX

Summary
- Airport type: Naval Air Station
- Operator: Indian Navy
- Location: Shibpur, Diglipur, Andaman & Nicobar Islands
- Coordinates: 13°14′0″N 93°3′0″E

Map
- Location within Andaman and Nicobar Islands Location within India

Runways
Direction	Length		Surface
Direction	m	ft	Surface
	1,006	3,301

INS Kohassa (ICAO: VODX) is an Indian naval air station under the Andaman and Nicobar Command of the Indian Armed Forces. It is located at Shibpur, a village located on North Andaman Island.

INS Kohassa was commissioned on 24 January 2019 at Shibpur by Chief of Naval Staff Admiral Sunil Lanba. Reena Lanba, president of the Naval Wives Welfare Association, unveiled the name plaque, and Commander Kuldeep Tripathi read the warrant as the first commanding officer. Lanba also inaugurated a new air traffic control building. The base is named after the Kohassa, the white-bellied sea eagle, a large bird of prey endemic to the Andaman and Nicobar Islands.

It is the third naval air base in the Andaman and Nicobar Islands, after INS Utkrosh at Port Blair and INS Baaz at Campbell Bay. Commissioning made the station self-contained, with fuel storage, repair facilities and personnel under a designated commanding officer. It was developed as a dual-use military and civil airfield under the UDAN scheme.

== History ==
INS Kohassa was established as Naval Air Station (NAS) Shibpur in 2001 as a Forward Operating Air Base (FOAB) for enhanced surveillance in North Andaman. Presently, Dornier 228 aircraft and HAL Chetak helicopters of the navy and the Indian Coast Guard land at Shibpur once in a week, on their transit for surveillance of North Andaman Islands. In addition, the Indian Air Force operates its Dornier aircraft between Port Blair and Diglipur every Thursday for courier duties. In 2009, the government of India accorded sanction to commission NAS Shibpur as a full-fledged air station. The length of the runway is being extended to 12,000 ft and will enable day and night operations.

Dornier 228s of the navy and coast guard conducted search for Malaysia Airlines Flight 370 from this base. In 2017, it was reported that the runway length would be extended to 3000 m after acquisition of about 100 hectares of land. This will enable the operation of wide-bodied civil and defense flights. The station, earlier known as NAS Shibpur, was renamed as INS Kohassa after the extension of facilities in January 2019.

== See also ==
Indian navy

- List of Indian Navy bases
- List of active Indian Navy ships

Integrated commands and units

- Armed Forces Special Operations Division
- Defence Cyber Agency
- Integrated Defence Staff
- Integrated Space Cell
- Indian Nuclear Command Authority
- Indian Armed Forces
- Special Forces of India

Other lists

- Strategic Forces Command
- List of Indian Air Force stations
- List of Indian Navy bases
- India's overseas military bases
