= Garacharma Island =

Island of the Andaman Islands

- Location within Andaman and Nicobar Islands

Geography
- Location: Bay of Bengal
- Coordinates: 11.635°N 92.689°E
- Archipelago: Andaman Islands
- Adjacent to: Indian Ocean
- Area: 0.38 km^{2} (0.15 sq mi)
- Length: 1.17 km (0.727 mi)
- Width: 0.40 km (0.249 mi)
- Coastline: 2.95 km (1.833 mi)
- Highest elevation: 0 m (0 ft)

Administration
- India
- District: South Andaman
- Island group: Andaman Islands
- Island sub-group: Port Blair Islands
- Tehsil: Port Blair

Demographics
- Population: 0 (2011)

Additional information
- Time zone: IST (UTC+5:30)
- PIN: 744101
- Telephone code: 031927
- ISO code: IN-AN-00
- Official website: www.and.nic.in

Garacharma Island is an island of the Andaman Islands. It belongs to the South Andaman administrative district, part of the Indian union territory of Andaman and Nicobar Islands. The island is located 6 km (4 mi) west of Port Blair.

== Geography ==
The island belongs to the Port Blair Islands and lies in the middle of Flat Bay.

== Administration ==
Politically, Garacharma Island, along neighboring Port Blair Islands, are part of Port Blair Taluk.
