= Ross Island, South Andaman district =

Island of the Andaman Islands

Ross Island
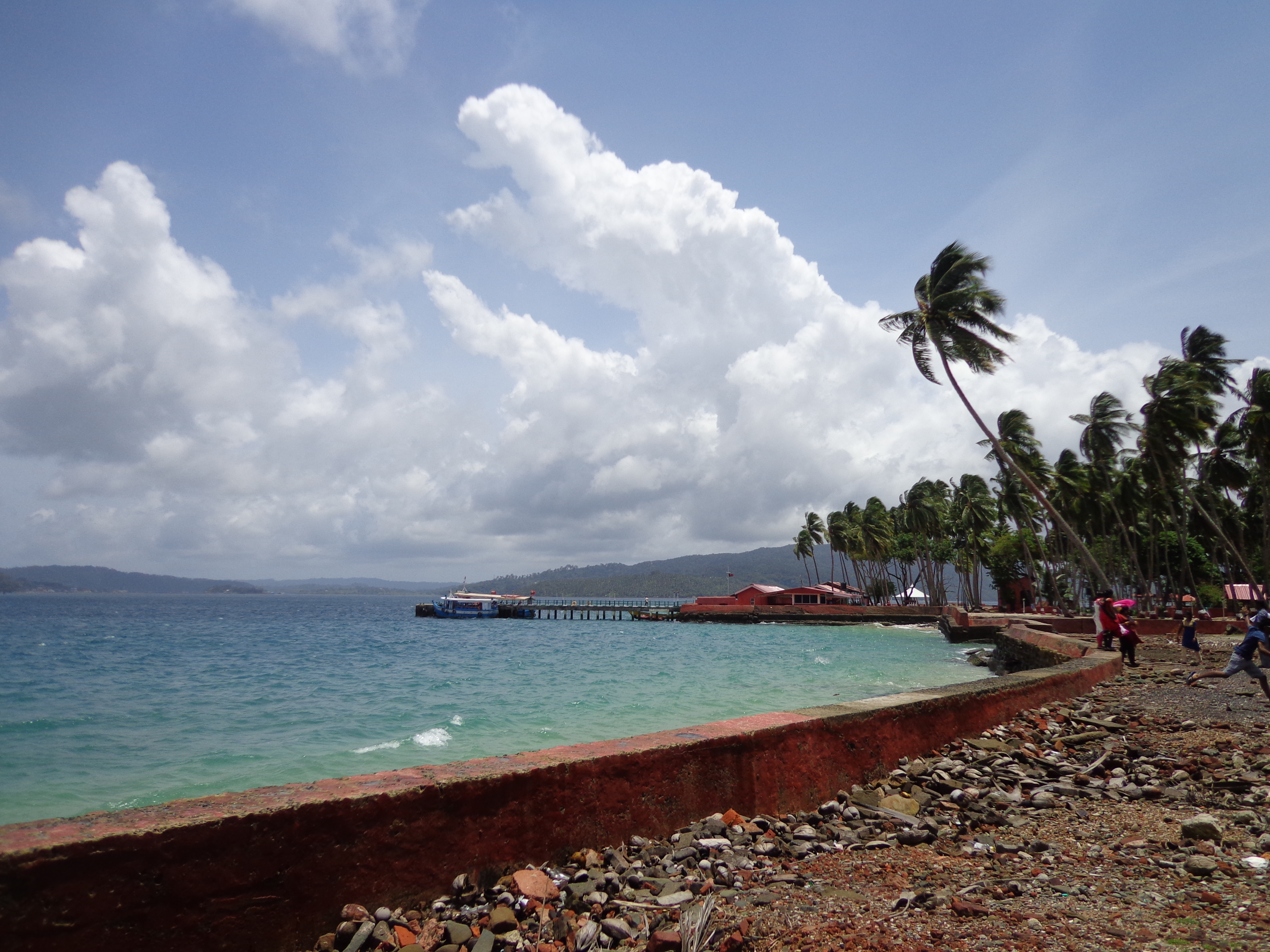

- Location within Andaman and Nicobar Islands Location within Bay of Bengal Location within India

Geography
- Location: Bay of Bengal
- Coordinates: 11.675°N 92.763°E
- Archipelago: Andaman Islands
- Adjacent to: Indian Ocean
- Area: 0.312 km^{2} (0.120 sq mi)
- Length: 1.25 km (0.777 mi)
- Width: 0.52 km (0.323 mi)
- Coastline: 3.20 km (1.988 mi)
- Highest elevation: 45 m (148 ft)

Administration
- India
- District: South Andaman
- Island group: Andaman Islands
- Island sub-group: Port Blair Islands
- Tehsil: Port Blair
- Largest settlement: INS Jarawa quarters

Demographics
- Population: 10 (2011)
- Pop. density: 32/km^{2} (83/sq mi)
- Ethnic groups: Indians, Andamanese

Additional information
- Time zone: IST (UTC+5:30)
- PIN: 744101
- Telephone code: 031927
- ISO code: IN-AN-00
- Official website: www.and.nic.in
- Literacy: 84.4%
- Avg. summer temperature: 30.2 °C (86.4 °F)
- Avg. winter temperature: 23.0 °C (73.4 °F)
- Sex ratio: 1.2♂/♀
- Census Code: 35.639.0004
- Official Languages: Hindi, English

Ross Island, officially named Netaji Subhash Chandra Bose Island, is an island of the Andaman Islands. It belongs to the South Andaman administrative district, Andaman and Nicobar Islands. The island is situated 3 km (2 mi) east from central Port Blair. The historic ruins are a tourist attraction.

== Etymology ==
Ross island was earlier named by the British colonial ruler of India after marine surveyor, Daniel Ross (1780-1849). In December 2018, it was officially renamed as 'Netaji Subhas Chandra Bose Island' as a tribute to Indian nationalist Netaji Subhas Chandra Bose (1897–1945).

== History ==
=== 1789: Early history ===
After Archibald Blair's survey of the Andaman and Nicobar Islands in 1789, a settlement was established at present day Port Blair (then called Port Cornwallis). In 1792 it was shifted to the Northern harbour (present day Diglipur) which was also christened Port Cornwallis (the former became Old Harbour). But, that settlement was abandoned in 1796 because of the high mortality rate. Between 1789 and 1792, Blair established a hospital and a sanatorium at Netaji Subhas Chandra Bose Island.

=== British colonial period ===
==== 1858-1947: Penal Settlement Period ====
Six decades later, the British had decided to establish a Penal Settlement in Andaman Islands and shifted the Penal Settlement from Singapore to Port Blair (Viper Island) in 1858. 1857 Revolt was a boon to the British for establishment of the Penal Settlement in Andaman Islands because establishment of a Penal Settlement in Andaman Islands was opposed in mainland of India and elsewhere. Capt. (Dr.) James Pattison Walker arrived in Port Blair on 6 March 1858 with 773 criminal convicts including 4 officials from Singapore. Capt.(Dr.) James Patterson Walker was the most trained jailor to deal with the hardened criminals. About 200 revolutionaries were deported to Andaman Islands; the ship with the revolutionaries sailed from Calcutta on 6 March and arrived in Port Blair on 10 March 1858. Ross Island remained the Administrative Headquarters for the islands till 1945--`46. It was abandoned in 1945--`46 after reoccupation. Netaji stayed at the island during his visit to Port Blair from 29 to 31 December 1943 during Japanese occupation. No damage reported due to Earth Quake in 1941 or thereafter. The ruins of the bazaar, bakery, stores, water treatment plant, church, tennis court, printing press, secretariat, hospital, cemetery, swimming pool, the Chief Commissioner's residence with its huge gardens and state grand ballrooms, the Government House, the old Andamanese Home', Troop Barracks, all in dilapidated condition, reminiscent of the old British regime. In November 1857, the Government decided to establish a penal settlement in Andaman and send "hard-core elements" among those who took on the British. There were two reasons: One, to keep them away from other prisoners and the other, to send out a message that a similar treatment would be meted out to anyone who challenged the British authority. In January 1858, the British took possession of three islands in and around Port Blair and Captain H. Man, Executive Engineer, hoisted the Union Jack. In March, J.P. Walker, an experienced jail superintendent, arrived in Port Blair with four European officials, an Indian overseer, two doctors, 50 naval guards and 773 convicts. Gauri Shankar Pandey, who belonged to a family that had suffered atrocities during the Japanese occupation of the Andaman and Nicobar Islands, has documented that it was water scarcity that drove Walker out of Port Blair to Netaji Subhas Chandra Bose Island.

Previously named after the marine surveyor Captain Daniel Ross, the island soon became the base. Initially, crude barracks of bamboo and grass were put up for the prisoners while the rest of the party stayed on board the ships that had brought them. Later, the prisoners built houses, offices, barracks and other structures at the penal colony after which they were promptly sent to Viper Island, where the first jail was constructed. The bungalow, meant for the Chief of the Penal Settlement, was constructed at the northern summit of the Island. Called Government House, the large-gabled home had Italian tiled flooring on the ground level. Now, some remains of the flooring are there, of course in a decrepit condition. During the late 1880s a small periodical called Ross Island Literary contained stories as well as memoirs of the first colonial days of the region. The publication was distributed from a store in the northern end of the island, and while largely forgotten today, was at the time considered relatively popular, if at times controversial.

In 1872, the post of Superintendent was elevated to the level of Chief Commissioner and Sir Donald Martin Stewart, who was at Ross Island for one year, was made the first Chief Commissioner. Stewart held the post from July 1872 to June 1875.

After Stewart, Netaji Subhas Chandra Bose Island saw 24 chief commissioners. But, it was during the tenure of Sir Charles Francis Waterfall that the Island's position as the seat of power collapsed.

Waterfall, who became the Chief Commissioner in 1938, was captured by the Japanese in March 1942 when the latter invaded the Andaman and Nicobar Islands during World War II. He was held as a prisoner of war and his deputy, Major Bird, was beheaded by the Japanese at the clock tower in Aberdeen, Port Blair.

==== 1941 Earthquake ====
About nine months before the Japanese take-over of the entire set of islands, Netaji Subhash Chandra Bose Island experienced an earthquake. The British started evacuation of the Andaman not for the Earthquake, but due to impending Japanese occupation during World War-II. Similarly, Ross Island was not abandoned in 1941 after the Earth Quake. Netaji Subhas Chandra Bose and other dignitaries stayed at Netaji Subhas Chandra Bose Island till 1947. It was abandoned after reoccupation by the British and just before Independence. Similarly, not a single brick of the Cellular Jail moved or damaged due to Earth Quake in 1941, 1942 or in 2004. The Cellular Jail was demolished by the Andaman Administration in 1960, when the Freedom Fighters who had been incarcerated in Cellular Jail protested and filed writ petition in the court. Hence, two and a half wings of the total seven wings of the jailed remained today. Therefore, there has been desperate attempt to distort the history of the Penal Settlement by the descendants of the criminal convicts who settled in Andaman after reoccupation as they were ostracised in mainland of India. None of the freedom fighters who had been incarcerated in Andaman settled in the island. Most of the mutineers were killed by aborigines and 66 of them were recaptured with help of the criminal convicts and aborigines and hanged at Viper Island in 1858. Two of them were deported back to mainland. Hence, none settled in Andaman.

==== 1942-1945: Japanese Period ====
From 1942 to 1945, the island was occupied by the Japanese. The Government House became the residence of the Japanese admiral for three years (from March 1942 to October 1945). It was during this period that Subhas Chandra Bose, who took the help of Japanese in his fight against the British, stayed at the Island for a day in December 1943. Netaji also hoisted the national tricolor at the top of the Government House. The Japanese too left their imprint on the island which stand in the form of bunkers used as watch points to safeguard the Island from any invasion.

==== 1945: Recapture by British ====
The allies reoccupied the island in 1945 and later abandoned it.

=== 1947-onward Independent India ===
==== 1979: Indian naval post ====
In April 1979, the island was handed over to the Navy. The island is maintained by the Naval Base INS Jarawa, which was commissioned in 1964 and is based in Port Blair.

==== 2018: renaming ====
On 30 December 2018, Prime Minister Narendra Modi announced that Ross Island was renamed as Netaji Subhas Chandra Bose Island.

== Geography ==
The island belongs to the Port Blair Islands and lies in the entrance of Port Blair.

== Administration ==
=== Civil administration ===
Politically, Netaji Subhas Chandra Bose Island is a part of Port Blair Taluk.

=== Demographics ===
No civilian settlement is allowed by the Naval authorities.

== Ecology ==
=== Flora ===
Netaji Subhas Chandra Bose Island has thick forests.

=== Fauna ===
Spotted Deer and peacocks are mostly found in the island and the island is full of palm and coconut trees.

== Tourism ==
=== Netaji Subhash Memorial ===
Netaji Subhash Memorial, proposed model and plan unveiled in 2023 by the Prime Minister Modi, will have "a museum, a cable car ropeway, a laser-and-sound show, a guided heritage trail through historical buildings and a theme-based children's amusement park, besides a restro lounge."

=== Lighthouse ===
There is a pathway up to the northern end of the Island, where the new concrete 10 m high circular lighthouse Tower was constructed in 1977, on an offshoot rock about 50 metres (160 ft) away from the shore line. The tower is approachable during the low tide. It was at this lighthouse that photo voltaic panels were introduced for the first time in India, to charge the batteries for the operation of light.

== Transport ==
Netaji Subhash Chandra Bose Dweep Ropeway, was proposed in 2023 as part of the nation-wide Parvatmala initiative.

== Image gallery ==
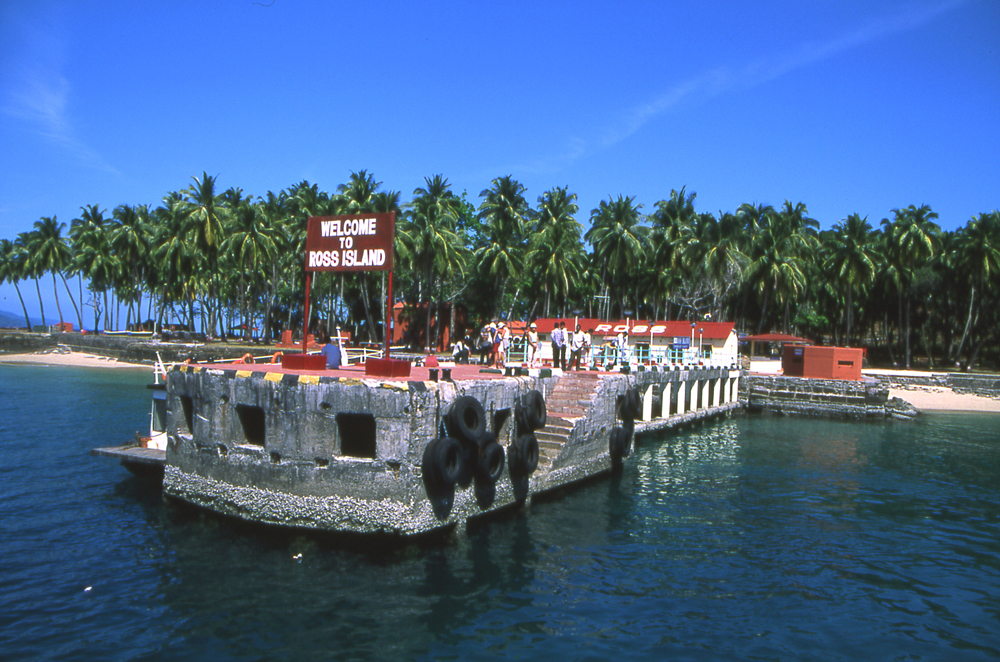
Netaji Subhas Chandra Bose Island (Andaman)

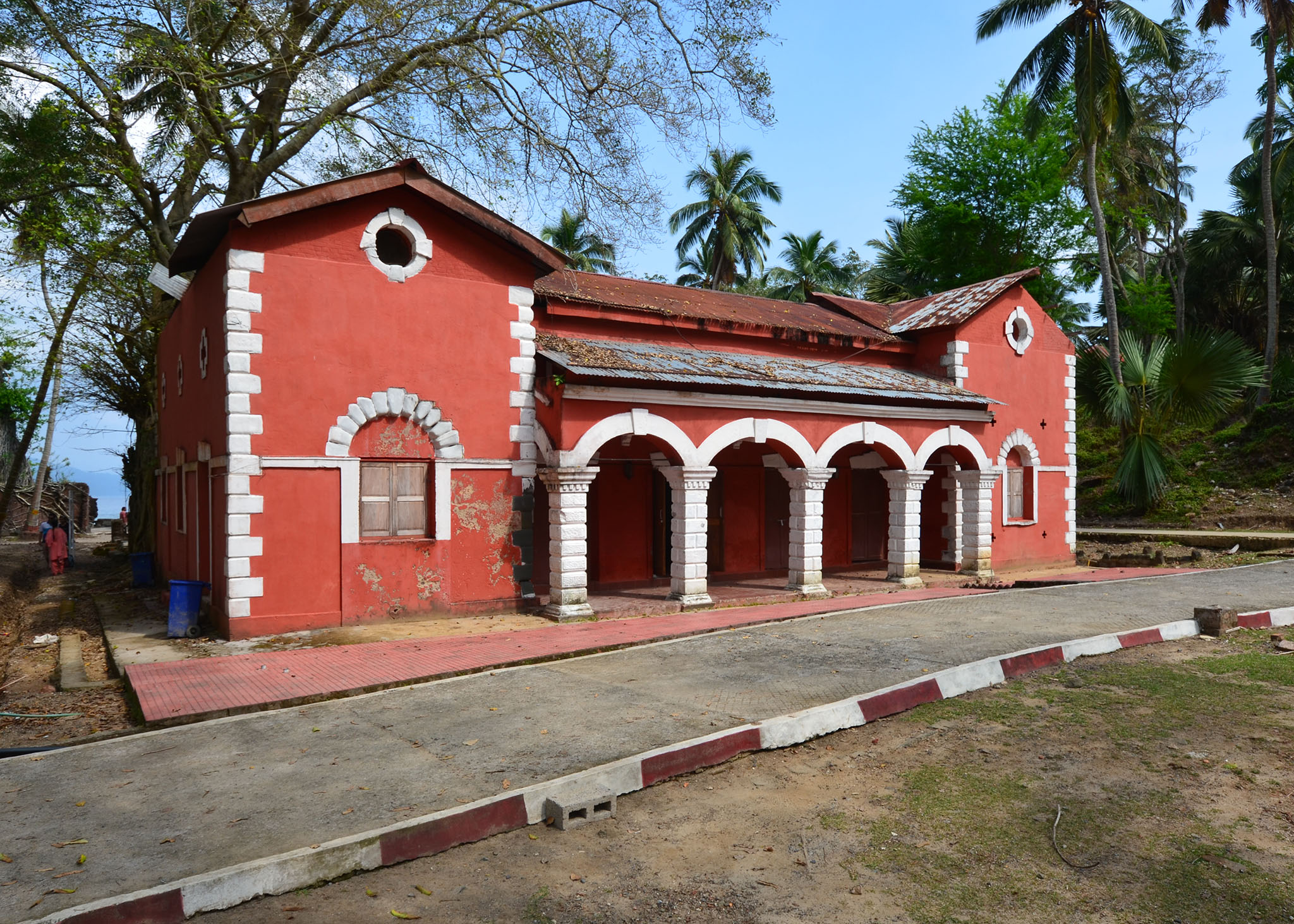
Bakery from the British era

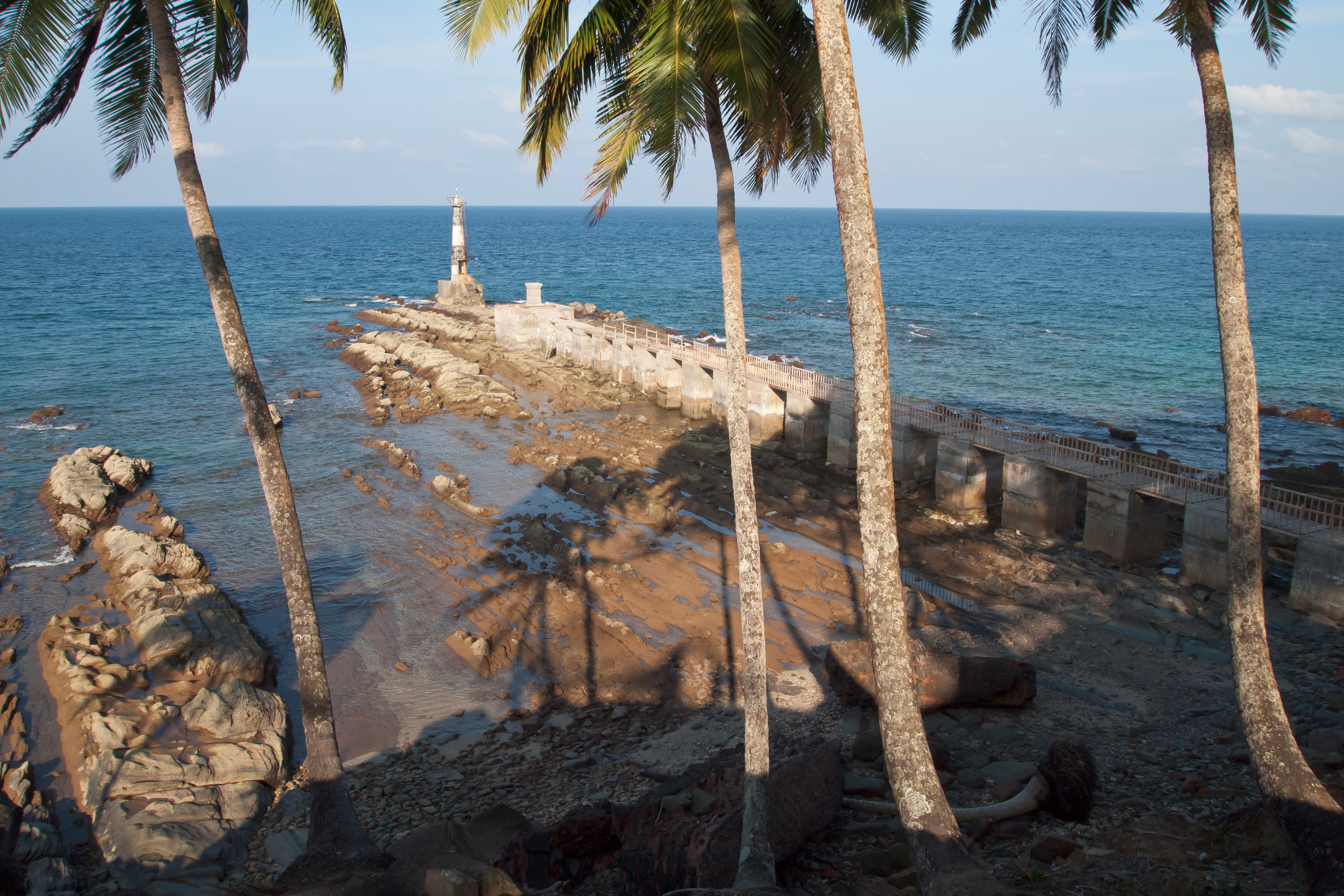
Old harbor and lighthouse

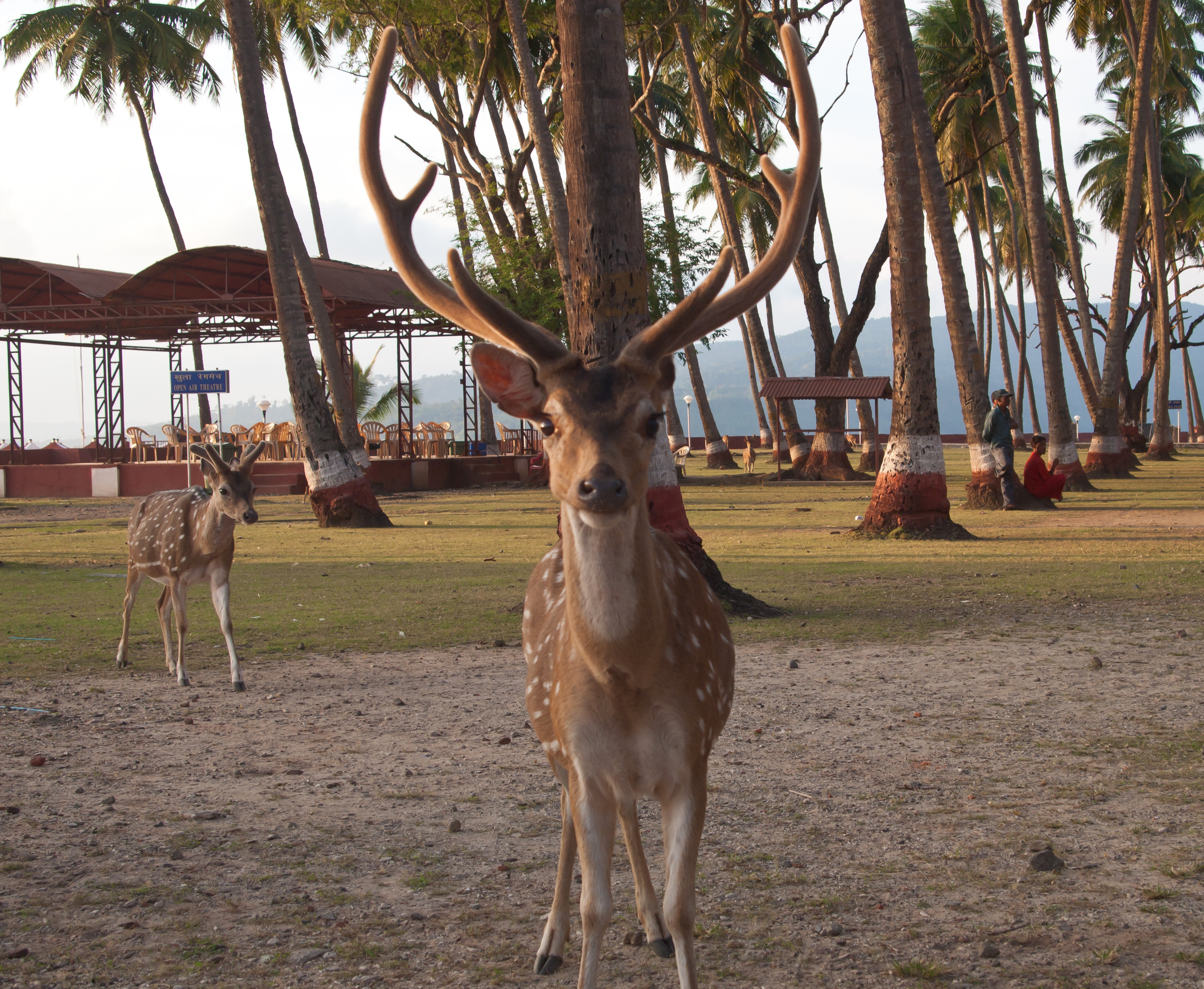
Free-roaming spotted deer

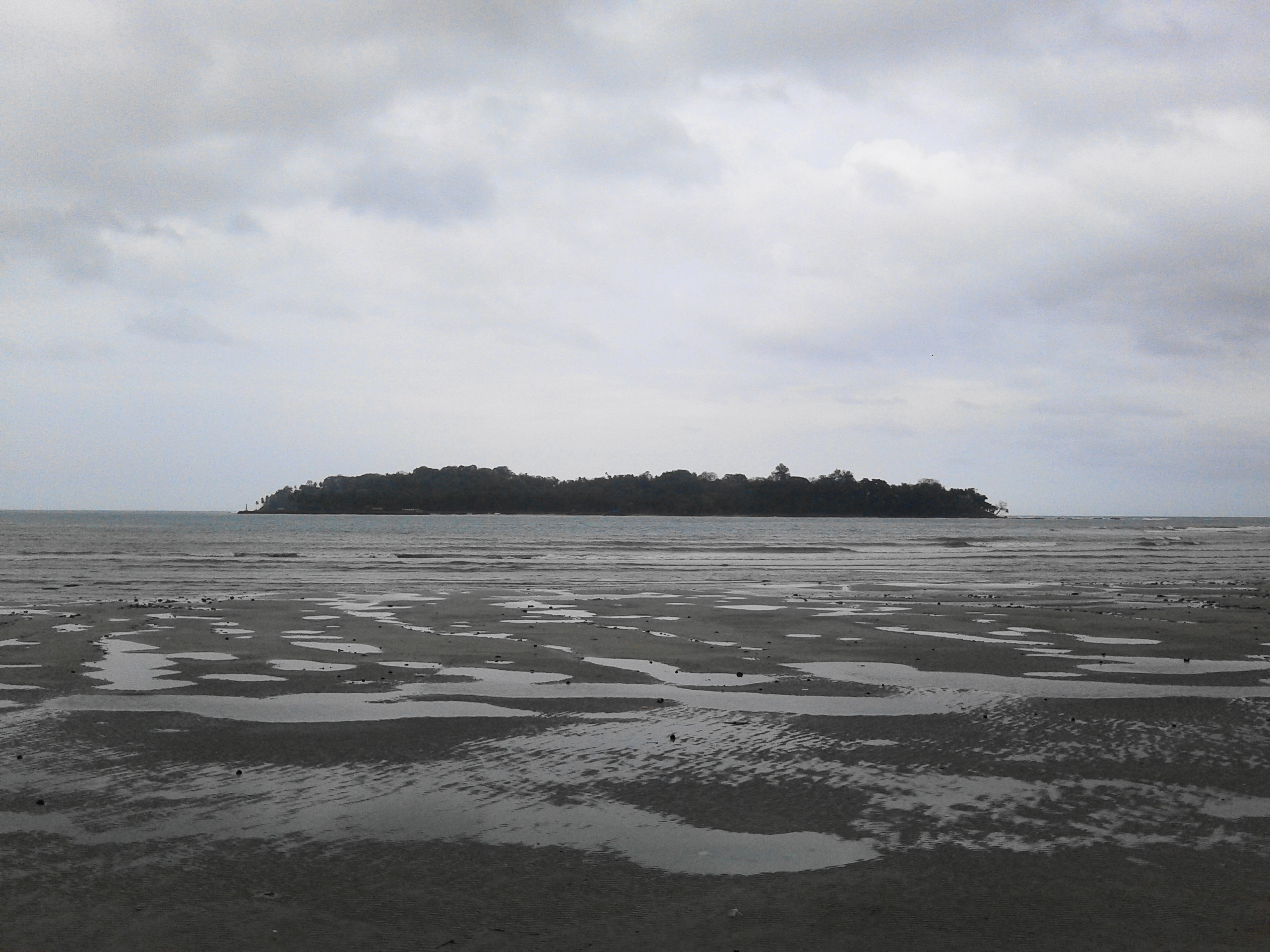
View of Netaji Subhas Chandra Bose Island from the Water Sports Complex, Port Blair

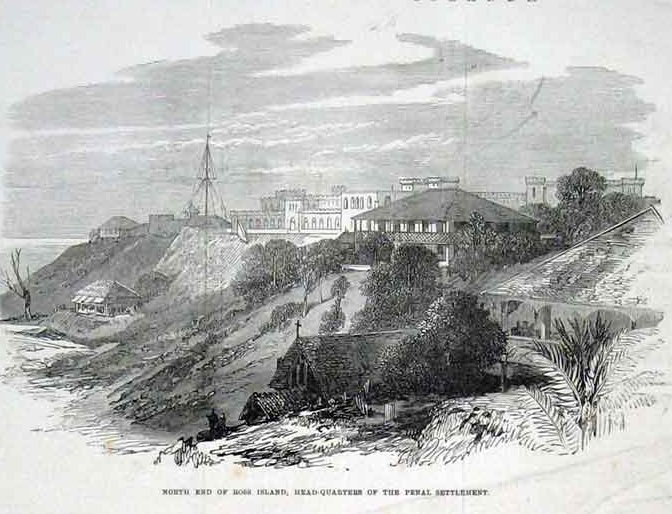
The Ross Island Prison Headquarters, 1872
