= Chatham Island (Andaman Islands) =

Island in the Bay of Bengal

- Location within Andaman and Nicobar Islands

Geography
- Location: Bay of Bengal
- Coordinates: 11.688°N 92.724°E
- Archipelago: Andaman Islands
- Adjacent to: Indian Ocean
- Area: 0.093 km^{2} (0.036 sq mi)
- Length: 0.2 km (0.12 mi)
- Width: 0.46 km (0.286 mi)
- Coastline: 1.78 km (1.106 mi)
- Highest elevation: 0 m (0 ft)

Administration
- India
- District: South Andaman
- Island group: Andaman Islands
- Island sub-group: Port Blair Islands
- Tehsil: Port Blair
- Largest settlement: Chatham Island living quarters

Demographics
- Population: 1 (2011)
- Pop. density: 10.75/km^{2} (27.84/sq mi)
- Ethnic groups: Hindu, Andamanese

Additional information
- Time zone: IST (UTC+5:30)
- PIN: 744101
- Telephone code: 031927
- ISO code: IN-AN-00
- Official website: www.and.nic.in
- Literacy: 84.4%
- Avg. summer temperature: 30.2 °C (86.4 °F)
- Avg. winter temperature: 23.0 °C (73.4 °F)
- Sex ratio: 1.2♂/♀
- Census Code: 35.639.0004
- Official Languages: Hindi, English

Chatham Island is an island of the Andaman Islands. It belongs to the South Andaman administrative district, part of the Indian union territory of Andaman and Nicobar Islands. The island is located 3 km (2 mi) north of downtown Port Blair.

== History ==
This is the island where the earliest British settlement in the Andamans began. In 1883, the British established the Chatham Saw Mill. In 1990, the Indians built the Forest Museum offering insight on the forest team activities, and has displays on the history of timber milling on the island.

== Geography ==
The island belongs to the Port Blair Islands and lies in the middle of Port Meadows.

== Administration ==
Politically, Chatham Island, along neighboring Port Blair Islands, are part of Port Blair Taluk.
