= Veer Savarkar International Airport =

Airport serving Port Blair, Andaman and Nicobar Islands, India

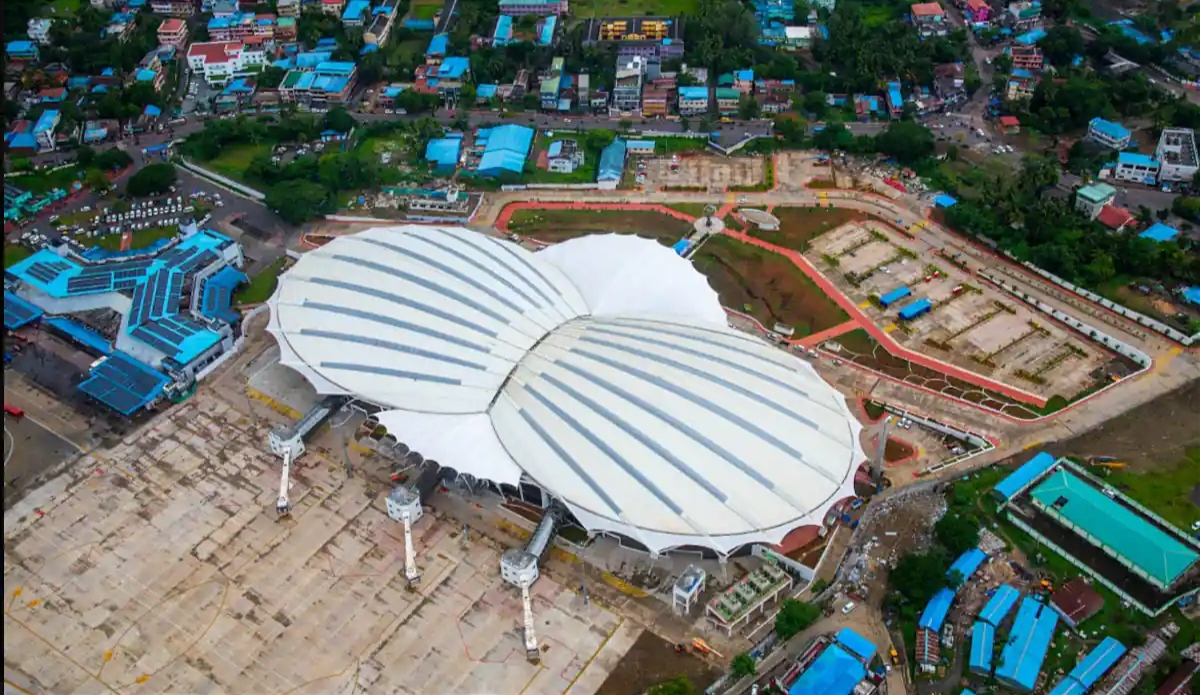
- Aerial view of the airport
- IATA: IXZ; ICAO: VOPB; WMO: 43333

Summary
- Airport type: Public/Military
- Owner: Government of India
- Operator: Airports Authority of India
- Serves: Andaman and Nicobar Islands
- Location: Port Blair, South Andaman, Andaman and Nicobar Islands, India
- Opened: 20 January 2000; 26 years ago
- Elevation AMSL: 4 m (13 ft)
- Coordinates: 11°38′28″N 092°43′47″E

Map
- Location of airport in Andaman and Nicobar Islands IXZ (India)

Runways
| Direction | Length | | Surface |
| Direction | m | ft | Surface |
|---|---|---|---|
| 04/22 | 3,290 | 10,794 | Asphalt |

Statistics (April 2025 - March 2026)
- Passengers: 18,16,485 (▲9.6%)
- Aircraft movements: 15,481 (▲23.6%)
- Cargo tonnage: 9,326.7 (▲18%)
- Source: Airports Authority of India

Veer Savarkar International Airport (IATA: IXZ, ICAO: VOPB) is the primary airport serving the Andaman and Nicobar Islands of India. It is located about 2 km (1.2 mi) south of Port Blair, the capital of the islands. It opened in 2000 and was named after Indian politician Vinayak Damodar Savarkar in 2002.

The airport operates as a civil enclave, sharing airside facilities with INS Utkrosh of the Indian Navy. While the civilian terminals are operated by the Airports Authority of India, air traffic operations are overseen by the Indian Navy.

== History ==
In 1937, the British Indian government established a temporary air strip at Port Blair for handling fighter aircraft. During the Second World War, British Overseas Airways Corporation (BOAC) operated routes connecting the Indian subcontinent with the Malay Peninsula via Burma and Siam. In mid-1941, alternate routes had to be planned due to the advancement of the Japanese forces, which involved flying from Calcutta to Port Blair and onward to Dutch East Indies. In December 1941, the alternate routes were activated after the Japanese invaded Siam, and the Port Blair airport served as a refueling stop for the allied aircraft. After the Japanese captured the Andaman and Nicobar Islands in June 1942, the runway was paved and the air strip was improved to make it capable of handling passenger flights. However, bombings during the war damaged the airport, and made it non-functional.

After the Indian Independence, the Government of India permitted Airways India to operate non-scheduled passenger flights using a Catalina aircraft between Calcutta and Port Blair in 1955. Regular commercial services to the airport were started by the Indian Airlines in 1960. The control of the aircraft operations at the airport was handed over to the Indian Navy in 1984. In 2002, the airport was renamed after Indian ideologue and politician Vinayak Damodar Savarkar. Plans for starting international flights from the airport were proposed in the late 1980s. However, the airport did not see a regular international service until 2024, when Air Asia launched services to Kuala Lumpur, which was discontinued less than a year later.

== Infrastructure ==
The airport has a single 3,290 m (10,790 ft)–long runway equipped with Visual approach slope indicator. There are six parking bays, capable of handling narrow body aircraft.

=== Terminals ===
The old terminal was spread over an area of 6,100 m^{2} (66,000 sq ft) and had a capacity to handle 400 passengers simultaneously. It had nine check-in counters and two boarding gates. In 2019, plans were announced for the construction of a new terminal at a cost of ₹7.07 billion (equivalent to ₹9.6 billion or US$100 million in 2026). It was completed in June 2023 and was inaugurated on 18 July 2023. The 40,837 m^{2} (439,570 sq ft) terminal has three floors–one each for arrivals, departures, and waiting. It is equipped with 28 check-in counters, four conveyor belts and three aerobridges, and is capable of handling 1,200 passengers (600 domestic and 600 international) per hour.

== Airlines and destinations ==
| Airlines | Destinations |
|---|---|
| Air India | Delhi |
| Air India Express | Bengaluru, Bhubneshwar, Chennai, Delhi, Kolkata |
| Akasa Air | Chennai, Kolkata |
| IndiGo | Bengaluru, Chennai, Hyderabad, Kolkata, Mumbai |
| SpiceJet | Kolkata |
