= Ko Racha =

Island group in Phuket, Thailand

Coordinates: 7.6106°N 98.3632°E

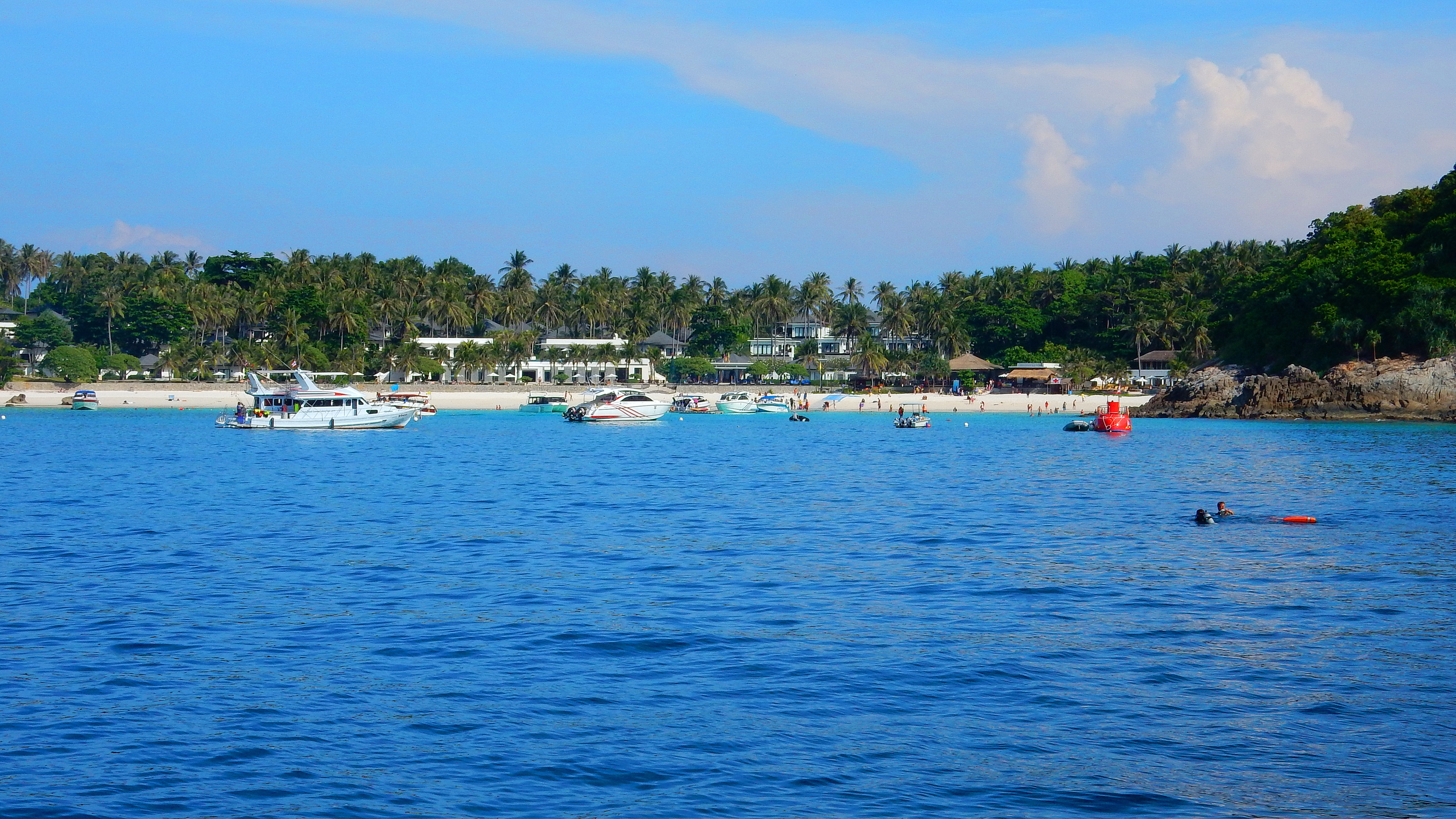
Ko Racha Yai

Ko Racha (or Ko Raya) is a small island group of two islands: Ko Racha Noi (or Ko Raya Noi) (3.06 square kilometres; 1.18 sq mi) and Ko Racha Yai (or Ko Raya Yai) (4.5 square kilometres; 1.7 sq mi), located off the coast of Phuket Island, in the Phuket province of Thailand. The islands are one of the local tourist destinations.
