= Intelligence, Surveillance and Reconnaissance =

Intelligence, surveillance and reconnaissance may refer to:

- Joint Functional Component Command for Intelligence, Surveillance and Reconnaissance, U.S.A.
- Intelligence, surveillance, target acquisition, and reconnaissance (ISTAR)

== See also ==
- 70th Intelligence, Surveillance and Reconnaissance Wing, USAF
