= Chatham Saw Mill =

Saw mill in Andaman and Nicobar Islands, India

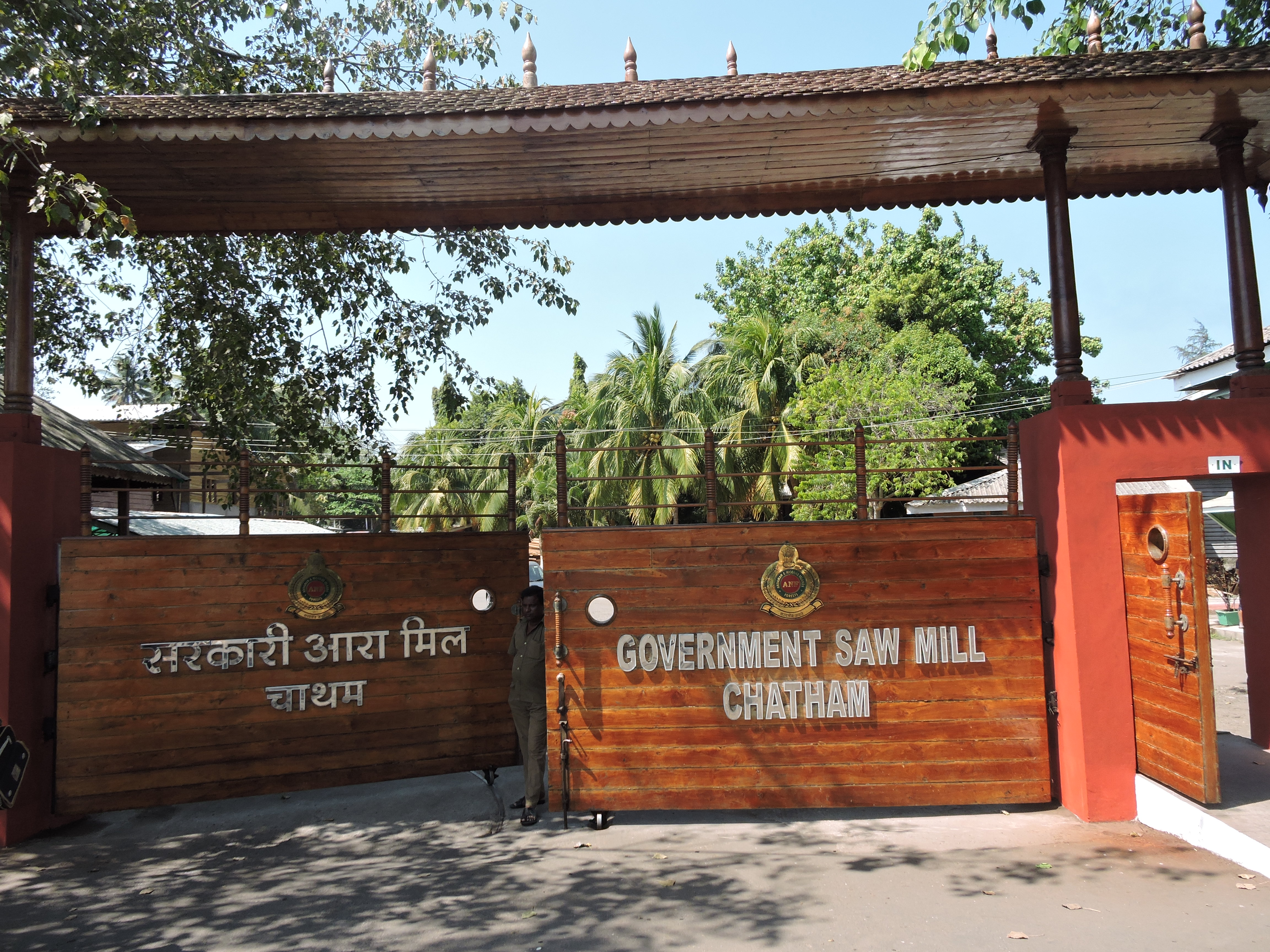
- Formerly: British Imperial Saw Mill (1883–1947); Andaman State Timber Mill (1947–1957)
- Company type: State-owned enterprise
- Industry: Wood processing
- Founded: 1883; 143 years ago
- Headquarters: Chatham Island, Andaman and Nicobar Islands, India
- Products: Timber
- Revenue: ₹180 million (US$1.9 million) (FY 2023–24)
- Operating income: ₹32 million (US$330,000) (FY 2023–24)
- Net income: ₹18 million (US$190,000) (FY 2023–24)
- Total assets: ₹1.2 billion (US$13 million) (including heritage assets)
- Owner: Government of Andaman and Nicobar Islands
- Number of employees: 342 (2024)
- Parent: Ministry of Environment, Forest and Climate Change
- Subsidiaries: Andaman Timber Museum (est. 2005)
- Website: forest.andaman.gov.in/chatham-mill

Chatham Saw Mill is a saw mill located in the Chatham island in the Indian union territory of Andaman and Nicobar Islands. It was set up under the British Raj in 1883 to produce timber for local construction works, as well as buildings in Britain.
