= Shibpur, Diglipur =

Shibpur
- Village
- Location in Andaman & Nicobar Islands, India Shibpur (India)
- Coordinates: 13.237982°N 93.039844°E
- Country: India
- State: Andaman & Nicobar Islands
- District: North and Middle Andaman district

Languages
  - Official: Bengali, Hindi, English
- Time zone: UTC+5:30 (IST)
- Postal code: 744202

Shibpur is a village located on North Andaman Island of the Andaman & Nicobar Islands in India. Administratively, it is a part of Diglipur tehsil of North and Middle Andaman district.

There is a 1 km long Indian Navy airstrip next to the village at INS Kohassa.
