= INS Jarawa =

Naval base of the Indian Armed Forces

Coordinates: 11°40′27.49″N 92°44′8.3″E

INS Jarawa(Indian Navy )
- Sri Vijaya Puram, Andaman & Nicobar Islands
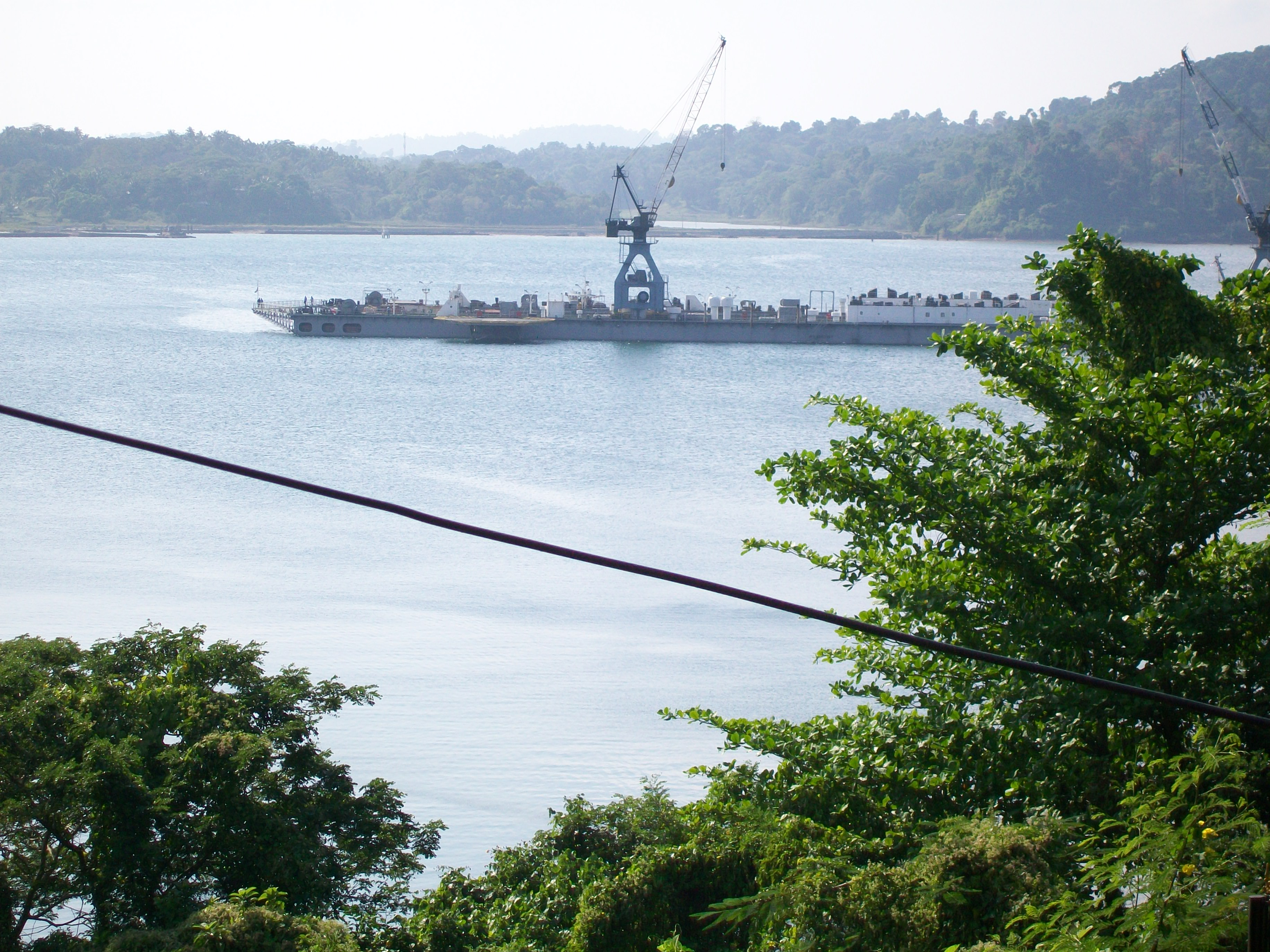
- Floating Dock Navy (FDN-1) at INS Jarawa

Site information
- Type: Naval station
- Controlled by: Indian Navy

Site history
- Built: 1964
- In use: 1964-present

Garrison information
- Occupants: Andaman and Nicobar Command

INS Jarawa is a naval base of the Indian Armed Forces under the joint-services Andaman and Nicobar Command located in Sri Vijaya Puram in the Andaman & Nicobar Islands. It was commissioned in 1964.

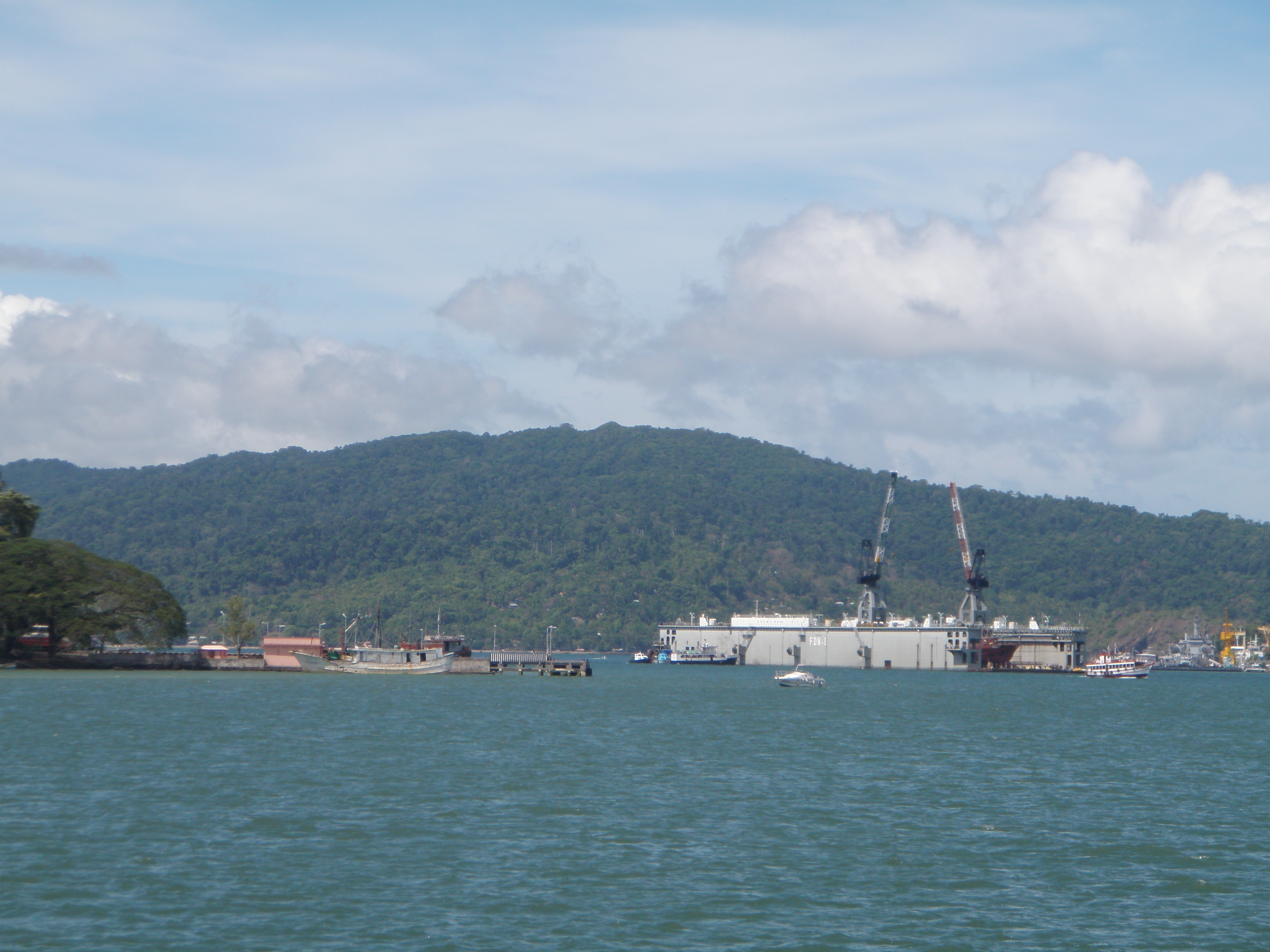
Floating Dock FDN-1 at INS Jarawa.

INS Utkrosh is an adjacent naval air station. INHS Dhanvantari is a naval hospital on the base. A Floating Dock Navy (FDN-1) of nearly 40,000 tonnes is also operated to dock many vessels under the A&N Command. A second, smaller floating dock (FDN-2) was also ordered in 2010.

== History ==
After the 1962 Sino-Indian War, the Navy was tasked with the defence of the Andaman & Nicobar Islands. Preparations for setting up naval establishments on the islands started in November 1962. In mid 1963, the first naval garrison of 5 officers and 156 sailors arrived in Sri Vijaya Puram (then Port Blair). After the Seaward class defense boats were deployed to the islands, a maintenance and repair facility was created to support these small craft. INS Jarawa was then commissioned in 1964 as the base to oversee all naval operations on the islands. The base is named for the indigenous adivasi Jarawa tribe of the Andaman islands.

INS Magar, an amphibious warfare ship, was the first major vessel to have INS Jarawa as its home port. Construction of a naval wharf for the base started in 1968. Comprehensive ship repair facilities were commissioned at the base in 1979.

On 6 November 2002, the 180 meter long floating drydock FDN1 sank in 24 meters of water off Sri Vijaya Puram . Only the dock crane tops remained above water. A Svitzer Salvage team from Singapore and The Netherlands, aided by the salvage vessel Perdana Sakti, was engaged to refloat the drydock. After a 3-day lifting operation, the drydock was returned to the Indian Navy on 15 February 2003.

== Band ==
The INS Jarawa Band is currently attached to the ship and based in Sri Vijaya Puram . The band was created in 1985 and has been a key component of military-civil relations in the city. It performed at various venues such as Raj Niwas, Port Blair, Netaji Subhash Chandra Bose Island, Marina Park. It also performs its standard music at Republic Day and Independence Day parades as well as during international events and good-will visits of Indian and foreign warships.

== See also ==
Indian navy

- List of Indian Navy bases
- List of active Indian Navy ships

Integrated commands and units

- Armed Forces Special Operations Division
- Defence Cyber Agency
- Integrated Defence Staff
- Integrated Space Cell
- Indian Nuclear Command Authority
- Indian Armed Forces
- Special Forces of India

Other lists

- Strategic Forces Command
- List of Indian Air Force stations
- List of Indian Navy bases
- India's overseas military bases
