= INS Utkrosh =

INS Utkrosh भानौपो उत्क्रोश
- IATA: IXZ; ICAO: VOPB

Summary
- Airport type: Naval Air Station
- Operator: Indian Navy
- Location: Port Blair, Andaman & Nicobar Islands, India
- Elevation AMSL: 14 ft / 4 m
- Coordinates: 11°38′28″N 092°43′47″E
- Interactive map of INS Utkrosh

Runways
| Direction | Length | | Surface |
| Direction | m | ft | Surface |
|---|---|---|---|
| 04/22 | 3,290 | 10,795 | Asphalt |
- Source: DAFIF

INS Utkrosh (IATA: N/A, ICAO: VOPB), is an Indian naval air station under the joint-services Andaman and Nicobar Command of the Indian Armed Forces. It is located near naval base INS Jarawa on Port Blair, the capital city of the Andaman and Nicobar Islands.

It shares airside facilities with Veer Savarkar International Airport which handles civilian traffic.

== History ==
The airfield at Port Blair was transferred from the Directorate General of Civil Aviation to the Indian Navy on 9 March 1984. It was initially commissioned as INS Jarawa II.

On 11 May 1985, the air station was formally commissioned as INS Utkrosh by then Defence Minister of India, P. V. Narasimha Rao, making it the first naval air station in the Andaman and Nicobar Islands. The first Commanding Officer of the Station was Cdr SS Kahlon. Its location makes it an important strategic station for protecting India's maritime interests in the Bay of Bengal. It also serves as an important facility for undertaking humanitarian operations, such as disaster relief and evacuation of medical emergencies from the remote islands.

The facilities at INS Utkrosh have been significantly upgraded. The runway has been lengthened to almost 11,000 feet (3,400 m). Except for the civilian terminal operated by the Airports Authority of India, all other air traffic operations over Port Blair are undertaken by INS Utkrosh. The geography makes this a difficult airfield for aircraft, as a hillock at one end means that planes can land or take off only in one direction. Winds change here every six months, so pilots have to either take off or land with strong tail winds.

== Units ==
Naval Air Squadrons based at INS Utkrosh include:

- INAS 318, a reconnaissance squadron operating Dornier 228 aircraft
- INAS 321, operating HAL Chetak helicopters
- INAS 325, operating HAL Dhruv Mk.III MR helicopters
- a Training squadron operating Pipistrel Alpha Trainer aircraft

== See also ==
Indian Navy

- List of Indian Navy bases
- List of active Indian Navy ships

Integrated commands and units

- Armed Forces Special Operations Division
- Defence Cyber Agency
- Integrated Defence Staff
- Integrated Space Cell
- Indian Nuclear Command Authority
- Indian Armed Forces
- Special Forces of India

Other lists

- Strategic Forces Command
- List of Indian Air Force stations
- List of Indian Navy bases
- India's overseas military bases
