= Nicobarese people =

Ethnic group of India

Nicobarese
Total population
- 28,912

Regions with significant populations
- Nicobar Islands, India

Languages
- Nicobarese languages

Religion
- Majority:- Christianity(95%); Minority:- Animism, Islam, Buddhism, Hinduism

Related ethnic groups
- Shompen people Austroasiatic people

The Nicobarese people are an Austroasiatic-speaking people of the Nicobar Islands, a chain of islands in the Bay of Bengal north of Sumatra, forming part of the union territory of Andaman and Nicobar Islands, India. The Nicobar Archipelago consists of 19 islands, of which only 12 are inhabited: Car Nicobar, Chowra, Bompuka, Teressa, Nancowry, Pulomilo, Great Nicobar, Kamorta, Katchal, Trinket, Kondul, and Little Nicobar . The largest and main island is Great Nicobar. The term "Nicobarese" refers to the dominant tribes of the Nicobar Islands and are most significant tribal population in the Andaman and Nicobar Islands due to their large numbers and the very wide area they occupy as compared to all the Andaman tribes put together. Each island's inhabitants have specific names, but collectively they are known as the Nicobarese. They call themselves "Holchu," which means "friend." The life of the Nicobarese revolves around nature. The socio-economic conditions of the people of Nancowry islands play an important role in the religious practices and social life of the Nicobarese community.

The Nicobarese are a designated Scheduled Tribe in India.

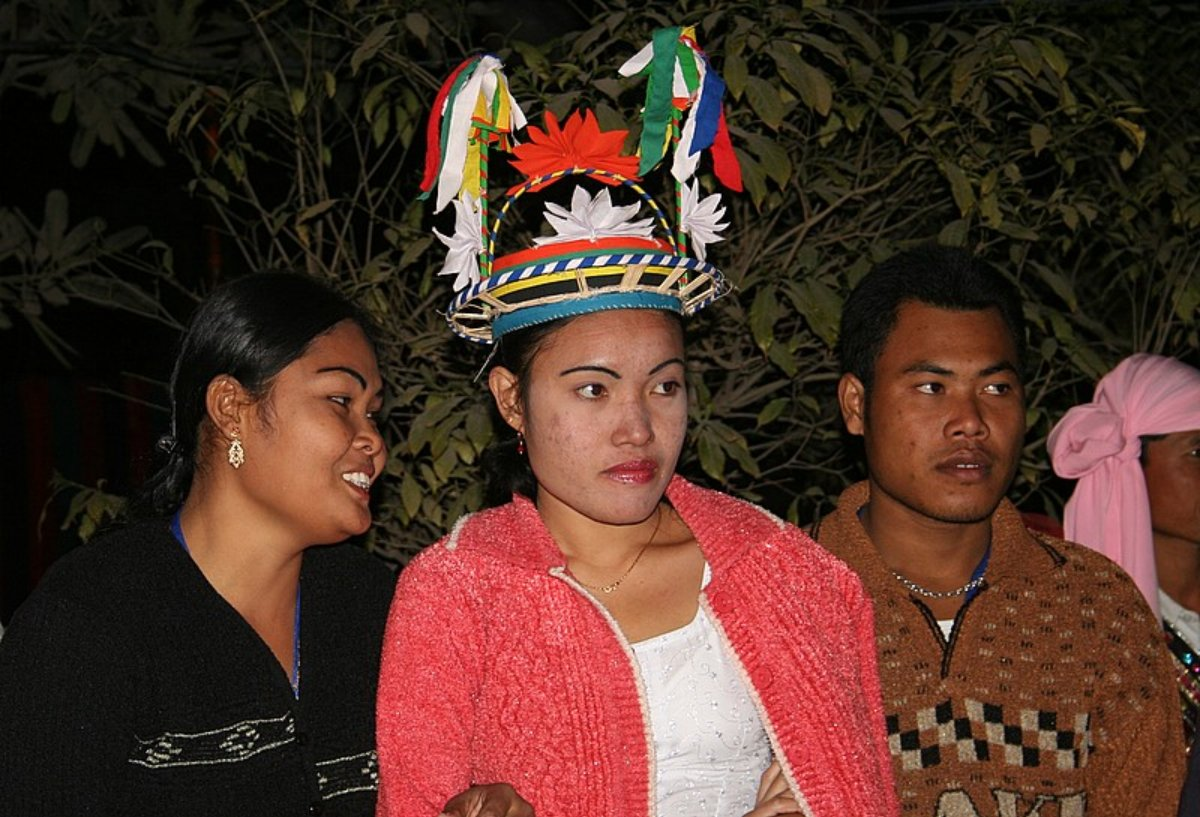
A group of Nicobarese dancers

== History ==
The Nicobarese may not have been the last people to live on the islands; they appear to have shared the islands with the Shompen who came to the islands earlier. The islands have been under the power of various Asian empires in the 16th century, Denmark from 1754–1869, the United Kingdom from 1869–1947, and India from 1947. Today they are administered by India as part of the Union Territory of the Andaman and Nicobar Islands.

== Language ==
The Nicobarese language is part of the Austroasiatic language family. All of the different islands speak different dialects of the Nicobarese language. The separate islands are categorized into four groups, although most of the people understand the Car Nicobar dialect.

- Car: Car (Pū)
- Chaura–Teressa: Chaura (Tutet/Sanënyö), Teressa (Taih-Long/Lurö)
- Central: Nancowry (Nang-kauri/Mūöt), Camorta, Katchal (Tehnu)
- Southern: Southern Nicobarese (Sambelong)

== Religion ==
Most of the people of the islands are of the Christian religion, which was taught to them by a man named John Richardson who translated the New Testament into Nicobarese. Besides Christianity, other Nicobarese follow the traditional religion of the islands, which is animistic in nature. They believe in spirits, ghosts, and the existence of the soul. A person becomes a ghost after their death when their soul leaves their body and the ghosts of all the Nicobarese are all around the islands. They believe that the spirits are responsible for all of the unfortunate occurrences on the islands, in the event of which shamans are called upon to handle the bad spirits.

== Art ==
Their painted sculptures are related to the oral tradition and the myth of Nicobarese origins. In their conception of the world, they inhabit the kingdoms of the sea, the earth and the sky, which they cross through the magic-religious sphere. These anthropomorphic creations are the spirits of living beings, natural elements, even everyday objects. They live with human beings or visit them from another world. In the houses, the spirits of the ancestors of the family inhabit the sculptures and are thus an integral part of the domestic environment: the inhabitants of today live in harmony with those of the other worlds, represented by the images.

== Society ==
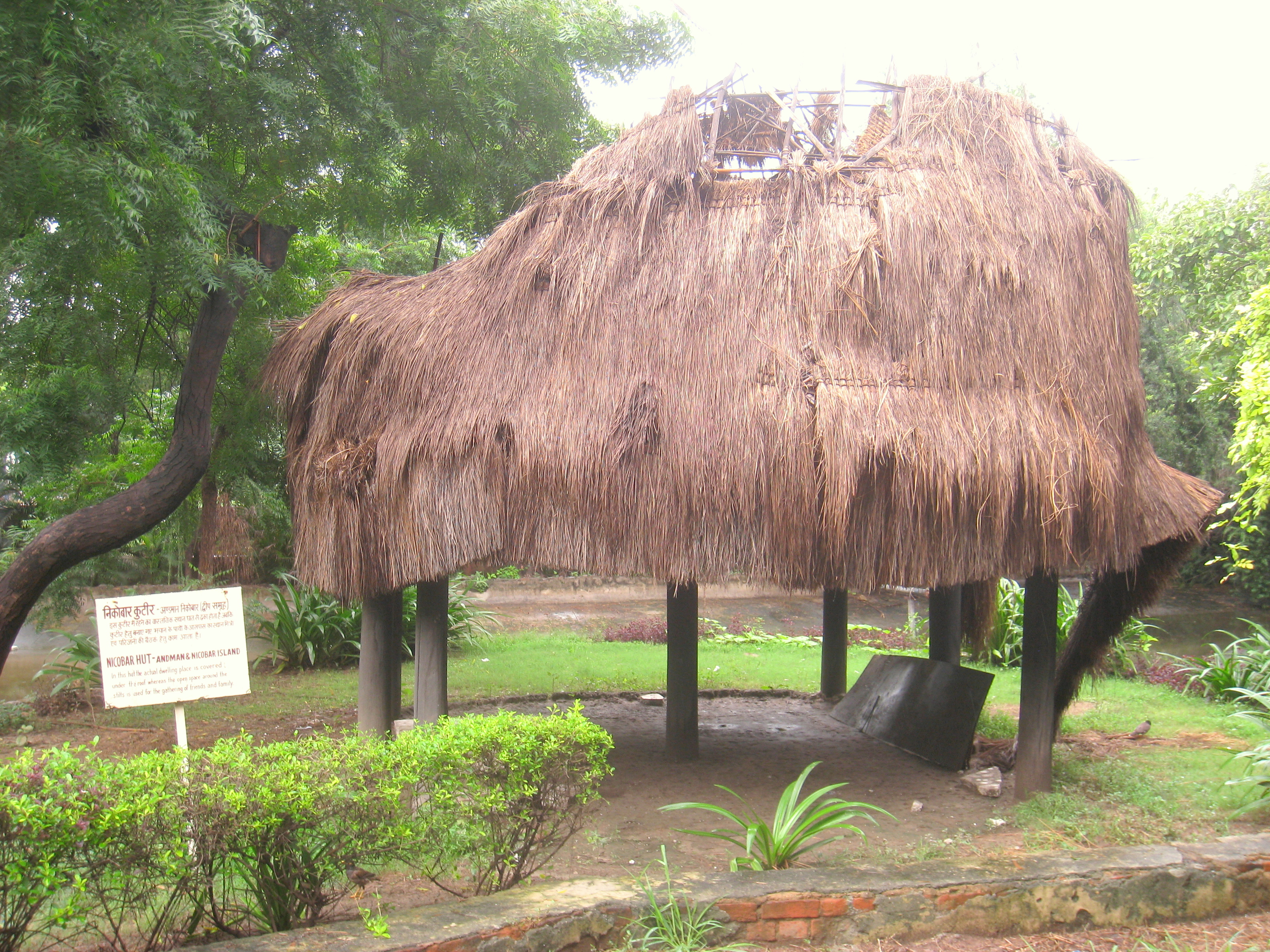
A traditional Nicobar hut

The Nicobarese are headed by a matriarchal chief. The first matriarchal chief of the Nicobarese was Islon who married Mewalal, tahsildar of Nancowry in 1941–42, and became the most influential person in the Nicobar Islands.

On the Nicobar Islands, men and women have approximate equal status. The women can choose their husbands, and after marriage they are free to live with either of the couple's parents. The Nicobarese men value the women economically because they not only take care of household duties, but also tend to the plantations and gardens.

The villages on the islands consist of sporadically placed huts strewn about in designated areas. The huts are normally round with dome-shaped roofs. They are typically raised above the ground and have ladders that the residents pull up after they climb into the huts at night.

== Economy ==
The Nicobarese have a traditionally horticultural economy; they base their monetary existence on the growing of coconuts, pandanus, areca nut palms, bananas, mangoes and other fruits. They also hunt, fish, raise pigs, make pottery and make canoes. Many of the older Nicobarese are illiterate, however today the younger Nicobarese receive free education through the government. Nicobarese are becoming educated over time and they are seen in multiple government jobs as doctors, teachers, policemen and clerks, among other occupations. The recent publication on the intensive ethnographic details of Nicobarese life highlights the different dynamics of their past and present lifestyles.

== Notable people ==
- John Richardson, Anglican bishop and politician, 1st MP of Andaman and Nicobar Islands Lok Sabha constituency
- Edward Kutchat, tribal leader
- Deborah Herold, cyclist
- Esow Alben, cyclist

== See also ==
- Andamanese people
