= Effect of the 2004 Indian Ocean earthquake on India =

Effect of 2004

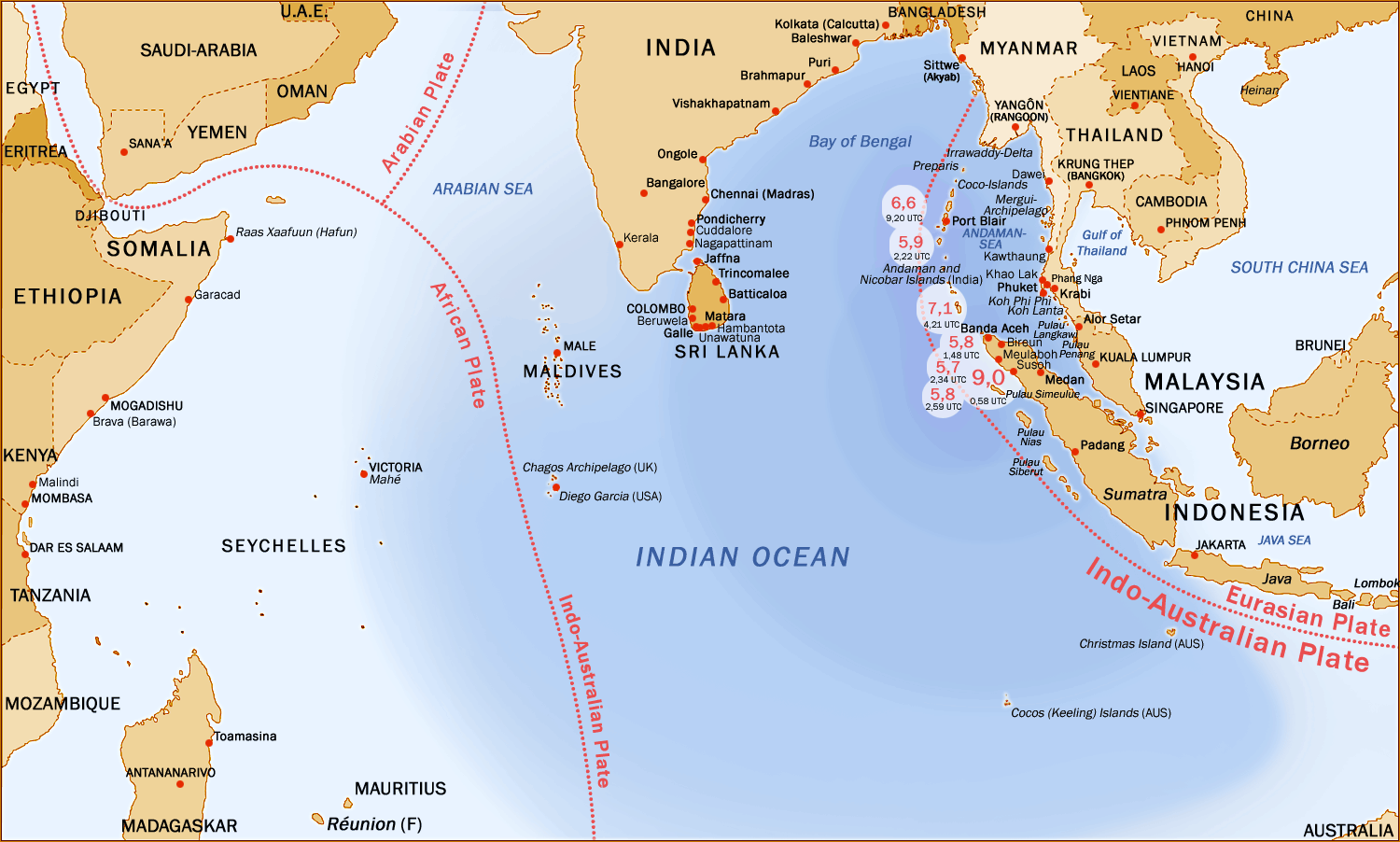
Countries affected by the 2004 Indian Ocean earthquake

According to official estimates in India, 10,749 people were killed, 5,640 people were missing and thousands of people became homeless when a tsunami triggered by the 2004 Indian Ocean earthquake near the Indonesian island of Sumatra struck the southern coast on 26 December 2004. The earthquake registered 9.2–9.3 M_{w} and was the largest in five decades. It was followed by strong aftershocks on the Andaman and Nicobar Islands. The death toll of the earthquake was 1,500 people.

== Affected states and regions ==
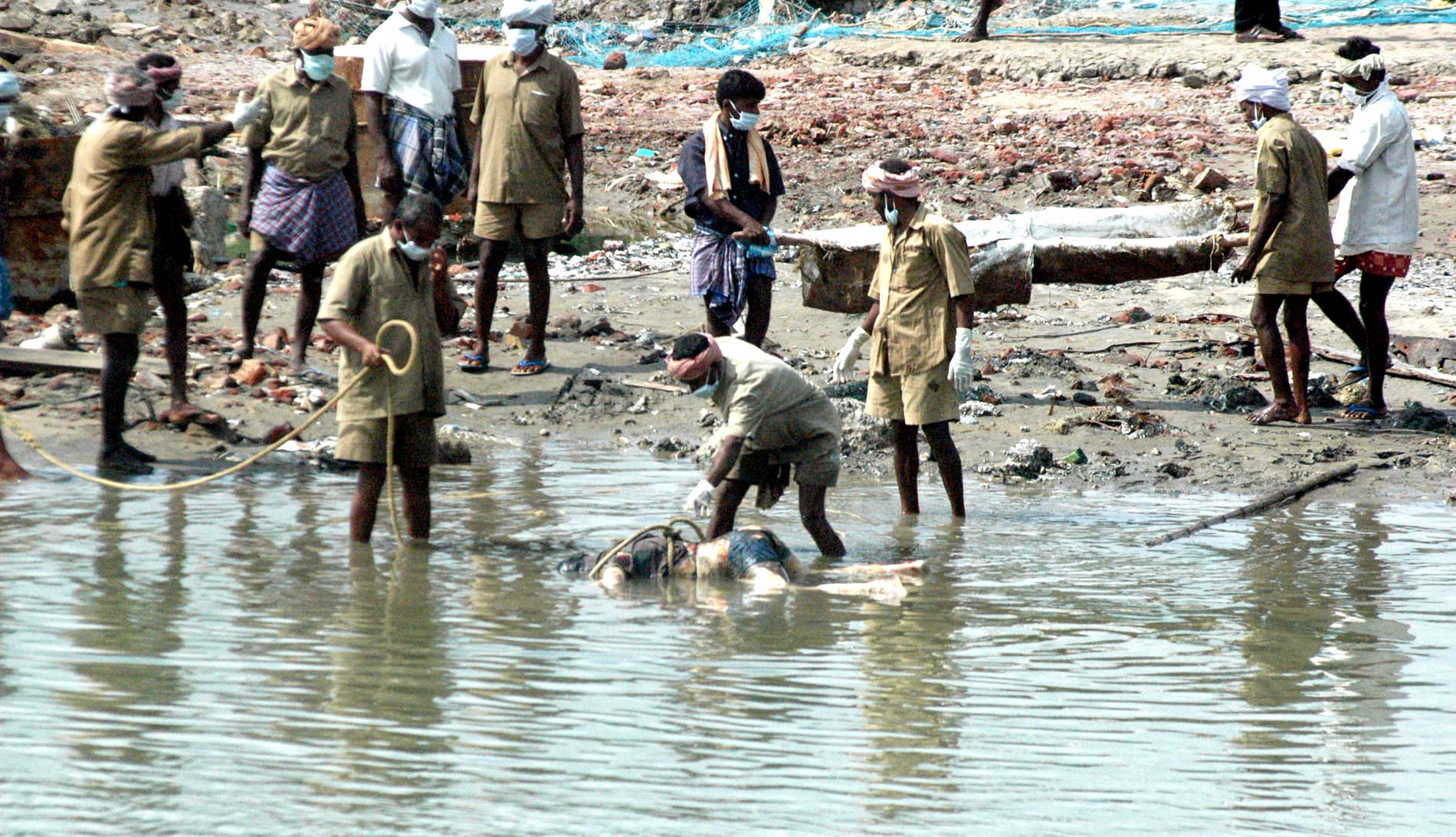
A Body is being retrieved after few days of ordeal at Nagapattinam on 2 January 2005

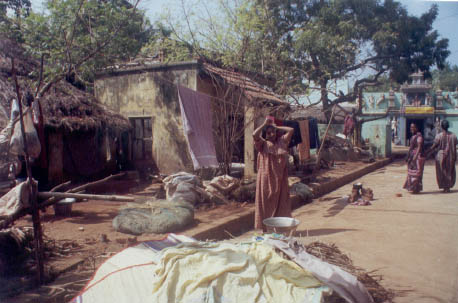
A scene of devastation caused by Tsunami waves in Kalapet village near Pondicherry

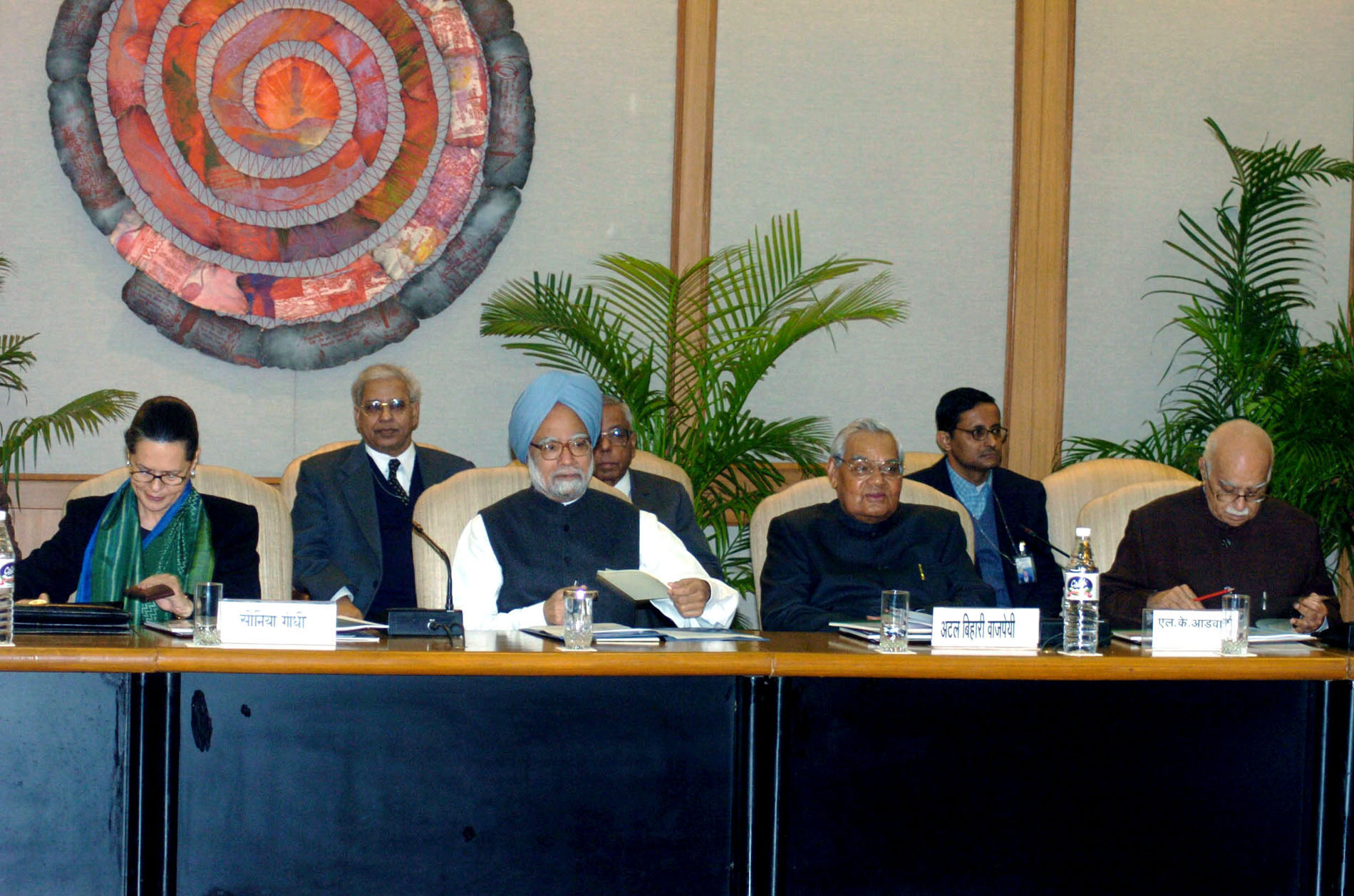
An All Party Meeting, featuring Prime Minister Manmohan Singh, Congress chairperson & convenor of the ruling UPA alliance Sonia Gandhi alongside BJP leaders Atalbihari Vajpayee & L. K. Advani to discuss Relief and Rehabilitations Measures of Tsunami Tragedy held in New Delhi on 9 January 2005

This disaster affected a total of fourteen regions. The Andaman and Nicobar Islands comprise 572 islands (land masses at low and high tide), of which 38 are inhabited by people from the mainland and indigenous tribes. The islands were just north of the earthquake epicentre, and the tsunami reached a height of 15 metres (49 ft) in the southern Nicobar Islands. The official death toll was 1,310, with about 5,600 missing. The unofficial death toll (including those missing and presumed dead) was estimated at 7,000. This ocean earthquake goes down in history as the deadliest of all time. It took the lives of over 230,000 victims throughout the fourteen regions and wounded more than double this number. The Great Nicobar and Car Nicobar islands were the worst hit among all the islands because of their proximity to the quake and relatively flat terrain. Aftershocks rocked the area, and one-fifth of the population of the Nicobar Islands was reported dead, injured or missing. Chowra Island lost two-thirds of its population of 1,500. Entire islands were submerged, and Trinket Island was divided in two. Communications were cut to the Nancowry group of islands, some of which were submerged.

On Car Nicobar, 111 Indian Air Force personnel and their family members were washed away when the tsunami severely damaged their air base. St. Thomas Cathedral (also known as the John Richardson church after John Richardson, an Anglican missionary and member of parliament) was washed away. The church, established in 1930 was one of the oldest and prominent churches in the region. A cricket stadium named after John Richardson and a statue dedicated to him were also washed away.

Most of the population of the Andaman Islands are people from the South Asian mainland, primarily Bengali Hindu refugees from East Bengal and Tamil Hindu refugees from Sri Lanka & Myanmar. The natives of the Andaman and Nicobar Islands are endangered tribal groups, such as the Jarawa, Sentinelese, Shompen, Onge and the Great Andamanese. They are anthropologically-significant as some of the world's most primitive tribes. Most have maintained their lifestyle for centuries, and government policy is one of non-interference. Most of the native islanders reportedly survived the tsunami because they lived on higher ground or far from the coast. The Onge (with a 2001 census population of 96), Jarawa (240), Sentinelese (39) and Great Andamanese (43) were reached by survey teams. The Sentinelese, on an island reserve, are hostile to outsiders and shot arrows at helicopters sent to check on them. On the Nicobar Islands the Nicobarese, a tribe with a Southeast Asian heritage (2001 population 28,653), lost about 656 lives with 3,000 missing. Surveys were conducted on the Shompen (2001 census count of 398) located on Great Nicobar island.

India's only active volcano, Barren 1 (on Barren Island 135 km (84 mi) northeast of Port Blair), erupted on 30 December due to increased seismic activity. The population was evacuated, and there were no casualties. Indira Point (6°45’10″N and 93°49’36″E), the southernmost point of the Great Nicobar Island and India itself, subsided 4.25 metres (13.9 ft) in the tsunami and its lighthouse was damaged.

== Meteorological and seismic reports ==
The Indian Meteorological Department warned people in coastal areas to exercise caution due to rough seas and tsunami. The Indian government issued a tsunami alert across India's coastal areas, triggering a panic which required clarifications.

== Ex gratia payments ==
Government	Ex gratia
Government of India	The Prime Minister Manmohan Singh announced an ex-gratia payment of Rs. 100,000 (one lakh rupees) to the next of kin of each deceased. The payment will be made from the Prime Minister's National Relief Fund.
Government of Tamil Nadu	The Chief Minister J. Jayalalitha announced an ex-gratia payment of Rs. 100,000 (one lakh) to the family of each victim.
Government of Kerala	The Chief Minister Oommen Chandy declared an Ex gratia payment of Rs. 50,000 to the next kin of those killed; assistance of Rs. 10,000 to the families of the deceased to meet funeral expenses
Union Territory of Puducherry	Chief Minister N. Rangasamy announced an ex gratia payment of Rs 100,000 (one lakh) to the next of kin of those killed. The administration would also pay an ex gratia Rs 5000 towards funeral expenses. For those injured in the disaster, the administration would provide Rs 5000. A sum of Rs 10,000 would enable the homeless to rebuild their homes.

== See also ==
- Disaster management in India
- Disaster Management Act, 2005
