= Great Nicobar Subdivision =

Administrative division of the Indian district of Nicobar

- Location within Andaman and Nicobar Islands

Geography
- Location: Bay of Bengal
- Coordinates: 7.20°N 93.73°E
- Archipelago: Nicobar Islands
- Adjacent to: Indian Ocean
- Total islands: 13
- Major islands: Great Nicobar; Little Nicobar; Kondul; Meroe; Pulomilo
- Area: 1,066 km^{2} (412 sq mi)
- Highest elevation: 642 m (2106 ft)
- Highest point: Mount Thullier

Administration
- India
- District: Nicobar
- Island group: Nicobar Islands
- Subdivisions of India: Great Nicobar Subdivision
- Largest settlement: Campbell Bay (pop. 5740)

Demographics
- Population: 8367 (2014)
- Pop. density: 7.8/km^{2} (20.2/sq mi)
- Ethnic groups: Hindu, Nicobarese

Additional information
- Time zone: IST (UTC+5:30)
- PIN: 744301
- Telephone code: 03192
- ISO code: IN-AN-00
- Official website: www.and.nic.in
- Literacy: 84.4%
- Avg. summer temperature: 30.2 °C (86.4 °F)
- Avg. winter temperature: 23.0 °C (73.4 °F)
- Sex ratio: 1.2♂/♀
- Census Code: 35.638.0003
- Official Languages: Hindi, English, Tamil; Car (regional)

Great Nicobar Subdivision is one of the three local administrative divisions of the Indian district of Nicobar, part of the Indian union territory of Andaman and Nicobar Islands. It is located in the Southern Nicobar Islands.

== Demography ==
It is a multilingual tehsil. Population of major languages are:

Tamil 1,091

Telugu 1,052

Nicobarese 1,003

Hindi 1,088

Kurukh 903

Sadri 817

Bengali 584

Malayalam 339

Punjabi 334

Santali 209

Mundari 177

Marathi 151

Munda 116

Kharia 116.

Languages of Great Nicobar tehsil (2011)
1. Tamil (13.0%)
2. Telugu (12.6%)
3. Nicobarese (12.0%)
4. Hindi (10.9%)
5. Kurukh (10.8%)
6. Sadri (9.76%)
7. Bengali (6.98%)
8. Malayalam (4.05%)
9. Punjabi (3.99%)
10. Santali (2.50%)
11. Mundari (2.12%)
12. Marathi (1.80%)
13. Munda (1.39%)
14. Kharia (1.38%)
15. Others (6.76%)

== Administration ==
The subdivision includes two tehsils:

- Campbell Bay, which includes the southern part of Great Nicobar and its HQ is Campbell Bay
- Little Nicobar, which includes the northern part of Great Nicobar, as well as nearby islands, and its HQ is at Afra Bay

== Image gallery ==
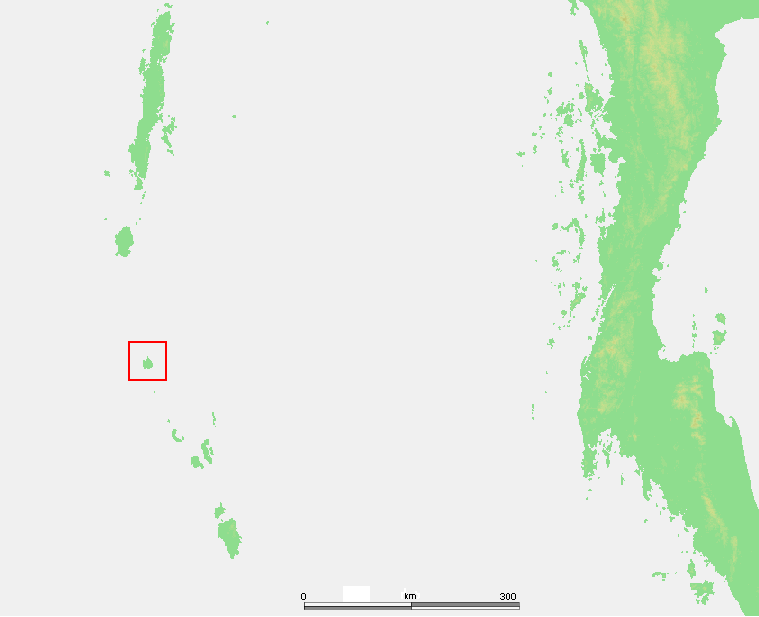
Location of Car Nicobar island
