= Nancowry =

Nancowry may refer to:

- Nancowry Island, Andaman and Nicobar Islands, India
  - Nancowry Subdivision, Nicobar district, Andaman and Nicobar Islands, India
    - Nancowry tehsil
  - Nancowry language, an Austroasiatic (Nicobarese) language of Nancowry
