= Chaura =

Chaura or Chowra may refer to:

- Chaura Island, one of the Nicobar Islands in the Indian Ocean
- Chaura language, an Austroasiatic language spoken there
- common name for Gaultheria mucronata

== See also ==
- Choura, a village in Punjab, India
