= Meroe Island =

Indian island

- Location within Andaman and Nicobar Islands Location within Bay of Bengal

Geography
- Location: Bay of Bengal
- Coordinates: 7.518°N 93.545°E
- Archipelago: Nicobar Islands
- Adjacent to: Indian Ocean
- Total islands: 1
- Major islands: Meroe Island
- Area: 1.1 km^{2} (0.42 sq mi)
- Length: 1.5 km (0.93 mi)
- Width: 0.9 km (0.56 mi)
- Coastline: 4.5 km (2.8 mi)
- Highest elevation: 10 m (30 ft)

Administration
- India
- District: Nicobar
- Island group: Nicobar Islands
- Subdivisions of India: Great Nicobar Subdivision
- Taluk: Little Nicobar

Demographics
- Population: 0 (2014)
- Pop. density: 0/km^{2} (0/sq mi)
- Ethnic groups: Nicobarese

Additional information
- Time zone: IST (UTC+5:30)
- PIN: 744301
- Telephone code: 03192
- ISO code: IN-AN-00
- Official website: www.and.nic.in
- Literacy: 84.4%
- Avg. summer temperature: 32.0 °C (89.6 °F)
- Avg. winter temperature: 28.0 °C (82.4 °F)
- Sex ratio: ♂/♀
- Census Code: 35.638.0002
- Official Languages: Hindi, English, Tamil; Car (regional)

Meroe Island is an island of India, located in the Bay of Bengal.

== Administration ==
The island belongs to the township of Great Nicobar of Little Nicobar Taluk.

== Flora and fauna ==
This island is known for its rich fish life.

== Image gallery ==
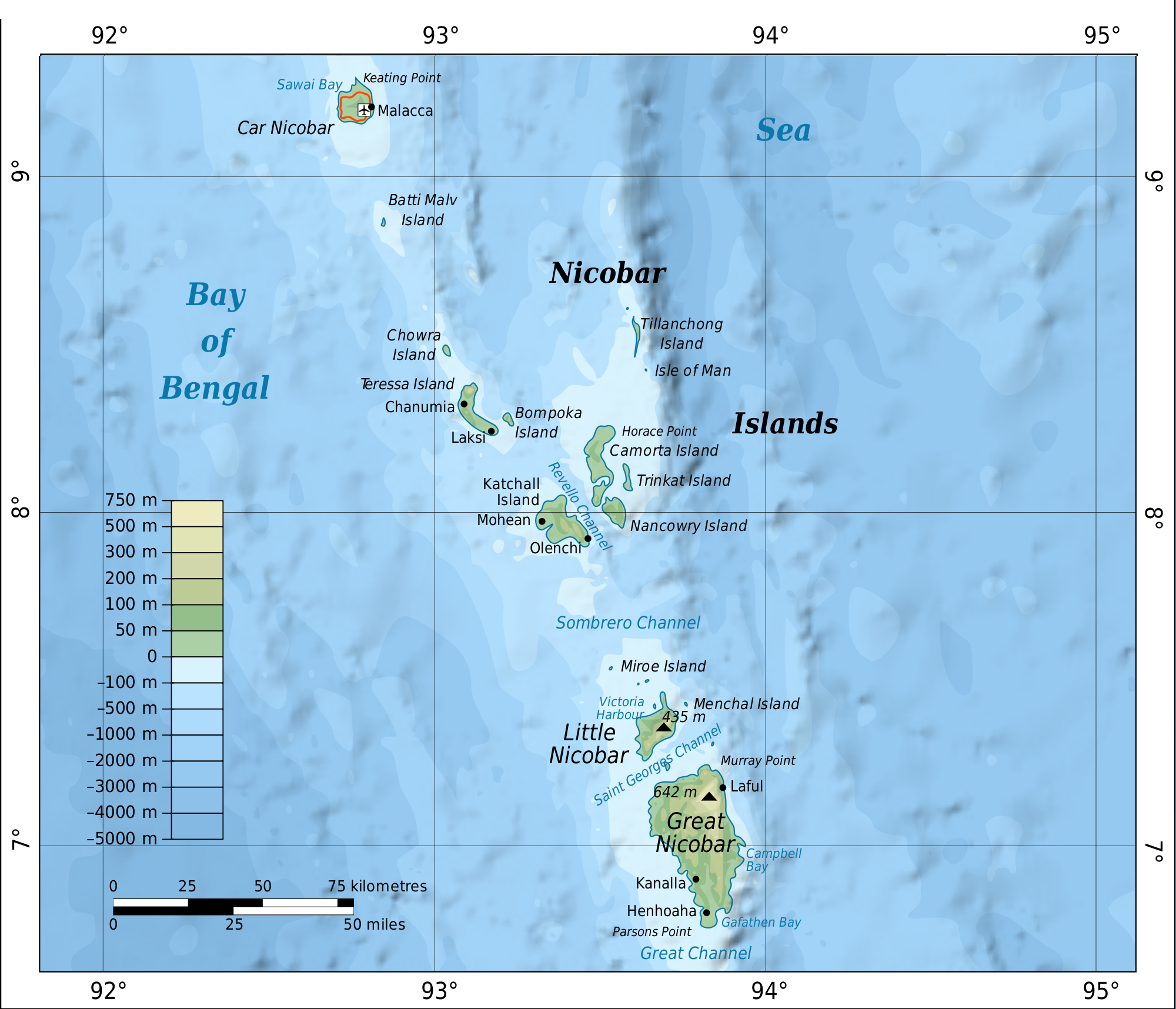
Map

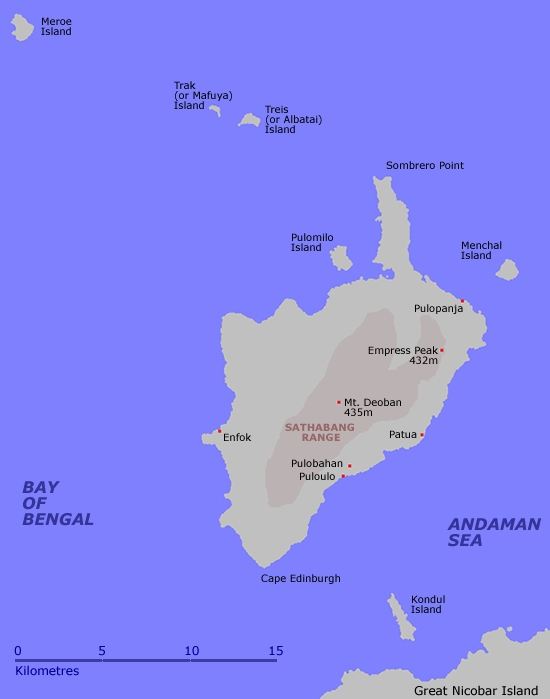
Map 2
