= Central Nicobarese languages =

Nicobarese language of India

Central Nicobarese
- Geographic distribution: Camorta, Nancowry, Katchal, & Trinket Islands, India
- Native speakers: (10,100 cited 2001)
- Linguistic classification: Austroasiatic: Nicobarese; Central Nicobarese
- Subdivisions: Camorta; Nancowry; Katchal (Tehnu)

Language codes
- ISO 639-3: ncb
- Glottolog: cent1990
- ELP: Central Nicobarese

Central Nicobarese is a group of Nicobarese languages spoken by 10,000 people (as of the 2001 census) on the Nicobar Islands. The varieties spoken on the various islands apart from Trinket are not mutually intelligible, and are considered separate languages:

- Nancowry (Nankwari)
- Camorta (Kamorta)
- Katchal (Tehnu)
