= Bompuka Island =

Native name: Poahat
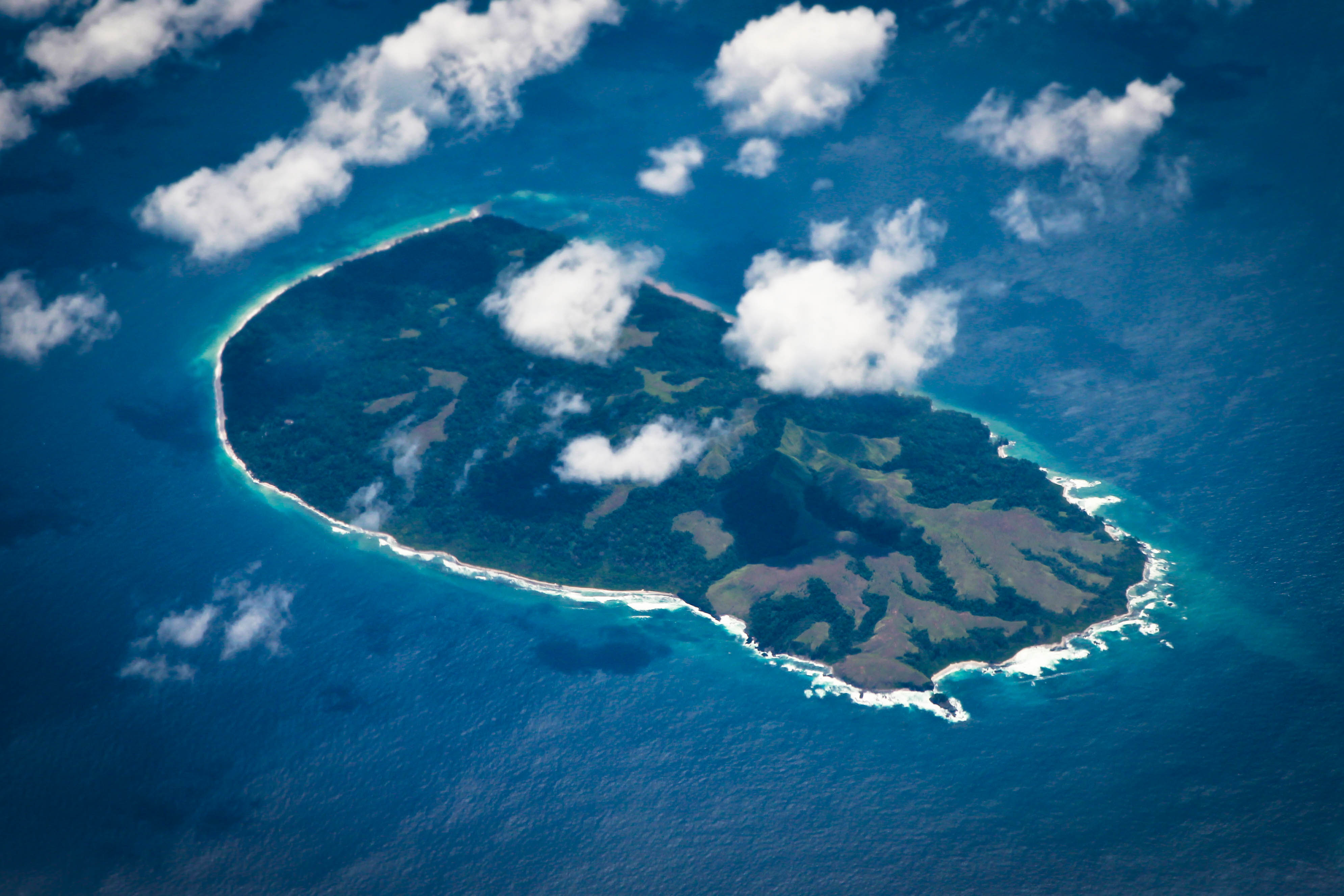

- Location within Andaman and Nicobar Islands

Geography
- Location: Bay of Bengal
- Coordinates: 8.24°N 93.235°E
- Archipelago: Nicobar Islands
- Adjacent to: Indian Ocean
- Total islands: 1
- Major islands: Bompuka
- Area: 9.31 km^{2} (3.59 sq mi)
- Length: 4.5 km (2.8 mi)
- Width: 2.5 km (1.55 mi)
- Coastline: 13.3 km (8.26 mi)
- Highest elevation: 193 m (633 ft)
- Highest point

Administration
- India
- District: Nicobar
- Island group: Nicobar Islands
- Subdivisions of India: Nancowry Subdivision
- Largest settlement: Poahat (pop. 0)

Demographics
- Population: 0 (2014)
- Pop. density: 0/km^{2} (0/sq mi)
- Ethnic groups: Hindu, Nicobarese

Additional information
- Time zone: IST (UTC+5:30)
- PIN: 744301
- Telephone code: 03192
- ISO code: IN-AN-00
- Official website: www.and.nic.in
- Literacy: 84.4%
- Avg. summer temperature: 32.0 °C (89.6 °F)
- Avg. winter temperature: 28.0 °C (82.4 °F)
- Sex ratio: ♂/♀
- Census Code: 35.638.0002.645045
- Official Languages: Hindi, English, Tamil; Teressa (regional)

Bompuka Island, also known as Poahat, is an island of India, in the Andaman and Nicobar Islands.

== Geography ==
The Island is located 3.5 km east from Teressa. The island has dense forest and some portions have grass. There is thick coconut palm growth on the shores around the island. Abandoned Poahat Village lies on the W side of the island. The portion of sea between the Teressa and Bompuka islands provides a good shelter for ships.

== Demographics ==
The Island had 2 villages: Poahat at the north, and Yatkirana at the south. Both abandoned. The former villagers still maintain Coconut, Tuber Crops as seasonal villagers from Teressa come to live on the island for a short period, carrying all requirements from Teressa Island. According to the 2011 census of India, Bompuka Island has 0 households. The Entire population of 21 people moved to Teressa following the tsunami, although they have attempted to restore habitation on the island, unsuccessfully.

== Administration ==
The island belongs to the township of Nancowry of Teressa Taluk.

== Image gallery ==
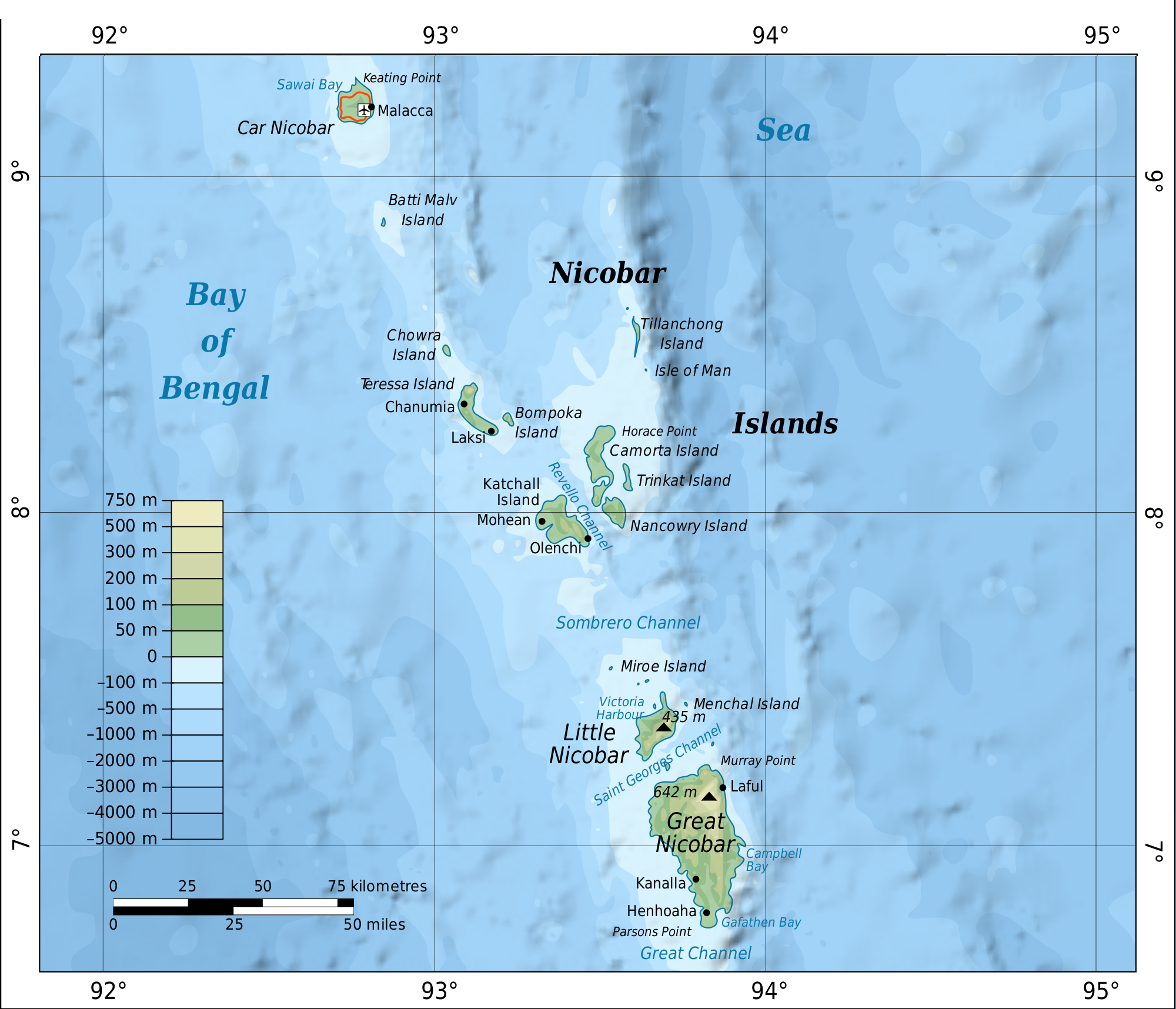
Map of the Nicobar Islands

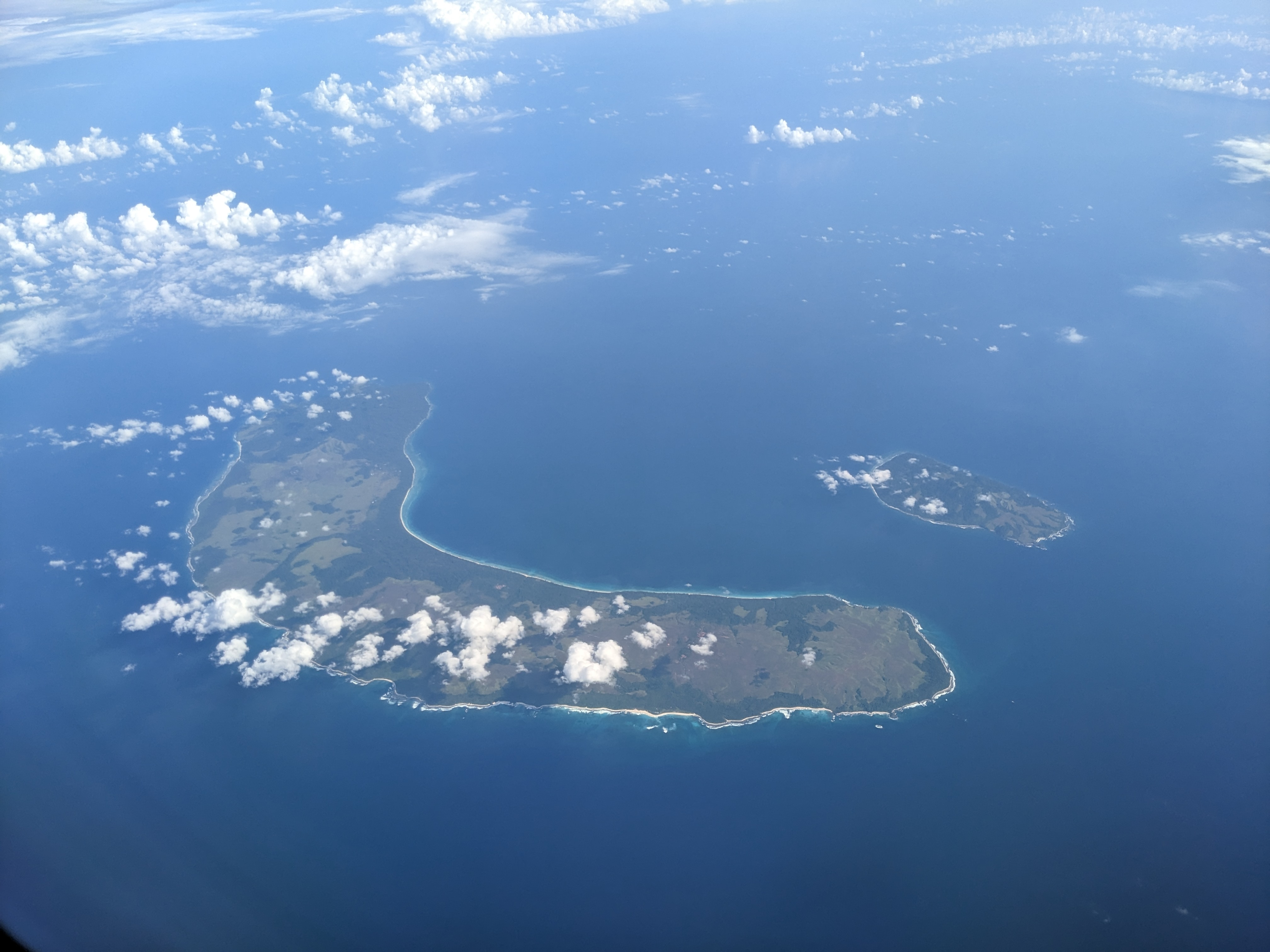
Bompuka Island (right), seen next to Teressa Island (left)
