= Kondul Island =

Native name: Tamengshe
- Location within Andaman and Nicobar Islands

Geography
- Location: Bay of Bengal
- Coordinates: 7.215°N 93.715°E
- Archipelago: Nicobar Islands
- Adjacent to: Indian Ocean
- Total islands: 1
- Major islands: Kondul
- Area: 1.55 km^{2} (0.60 sq mi)
- Length: 2.6 km (1.62 mi)
- Width: 1 km (0.6 mi)
- Coastline: 7.5 km (4.66 mi)
- Highest elevation: 92 m (302 ft)
- Highest point: Tamengshe

Administration
- India
- District: Nicobar
- Island group: Nicobar Islands
- Subdivisions of India: Great Nicobar Subdivision
- Taluk: Little Nicobar
- Largest settlement: Mayaiya (pop. 2)

Demographics
- Population: 2 (2016)
- Pop. density: 1.3/km^{2} (3.4/sq mi)
- Ethnic groups: Nicobarese

Additional information
- Time zone: IST (UTC+5:30)
- PIN: 744301
- Telephone code: 03192
- ISO code: IN-AN-00
- Official website: www.and.nic.in
- Literacy: 84.4%
- Avg. summer temperature: 32.0 °C (89.6 °F)
- Avg. winter temperature: 28.0 °C (82.4 °F)
- Sex ratio: ♂/♀
- Census Code: 35.638.0002
- Official Languages: Hindi, English, Tamil; Southern Nicobarese (regional)

Kondul Island is a small island off the Nicobar Islands in India.

== History ==
Kondul Island was affected by the 2004 Indian Ocean earthquake and tsunamidisaster. After the tsunami, the surviving population migrated to Great Nicobar. In 2015 2 elders returned to the island and they renovated the jetty. Poachers from Myanmar are doing illegal fishing around the island regularly.

== Geography ==
The island is located in the Bay of Bengal, halfway between Great Nicobar and Little Nicobar in the St. George's Channel, and measures 2.6 km long and 0.95 km of maximum width for an area of 1.55 km^{2} (0.60 sq mi).

=== Climate ===
It has a Tropical rainforest climate as even the driest months have rainfall greater than 60mm.

Climate data for Kondul Island (1981–2010, extremes 1953–2003)
Month	Jan	Feb	Mar	Apr	May	Jun	Jul	Aug	Sep	Oct	Nov	Dec	Year
Record high °C (°F)	31.8 (89.2)	38.4 (101.1)	36.2 (97.2)	35.2 (95.4)	35.0 (95.0)	33.6 (92.5)	36.0 (96.8)	32.5 (90.5)	32.0 (89.6)	31.8 (89.2)	32.6 (90.7)	32.4 (90.3)	36.0 (96.8)
Mean daily maximum °C (°F)	28.9 (84.0)	29.1 (84.4)	30.1 (86.2)	30.7 (87.3)	30.7 (87.3)	30.6 (87.1)	30.2 (86.4)	29.8 (85.6)	29.4 (84.9)	28.9 (84.0)	28.8 (83.8)	29.0 (84.2)	29.7 (85.5)
Mean daily minimum °C (°F)	24.2 (75.6)	24.2 (75.6)	24.5 (76.1)	23.9 (75.0)	24.3 (75.7)	24.3 (75.7)	24.4 (75.9)	23.7 (74.7)	23.4 (74.1)	23.5 (74.3)	23.6 (74.5)	24.1 (75.4)	24.0 (75.2)
Record low °C (°F)	18.0 (64.4)	19.2 (66.6)	19.0 (66.2)	17.4 (63.3)	17.0 (62.6)	14.6 (58.3)	15.2 (59.4)	14.0 (57.2)	14.2 (57.6)	16.4 (61.5)	16.2 (61.2)	15.4 (59.7)	14.0 (57.2)
Average rainfall mm (inches)	111.0 (4.37)	70.1 (2.76)	78.1 (3.07)	121.0 (4.76)	255.5 (10.06)	214.0 (8.43)	247.4 (9.74)	252.2 (9.93)	297.6 (11.72)	289.4 (11.39)	271.8 (10.70)	249.5 (9.82)	2,457.7 (96.76)
Average rainy days	5.9	3.5	4.7	5.4	11.7	10.7	12.1	13.4	12.8	13.2	12.9	8.8	115.1
Average relative humidity (%) (at 17:30 IST)	84	84	83	86	88	87	88	86	87	90	89	87	86
Source: India Meteorological Department

== Administration ==
The island belongs to the township of Great Nicobar of Little Nicobar Taluk.

== Demographics ==
Mayaiya village is inhabited and has a radio antenna.

== Image gallery ==
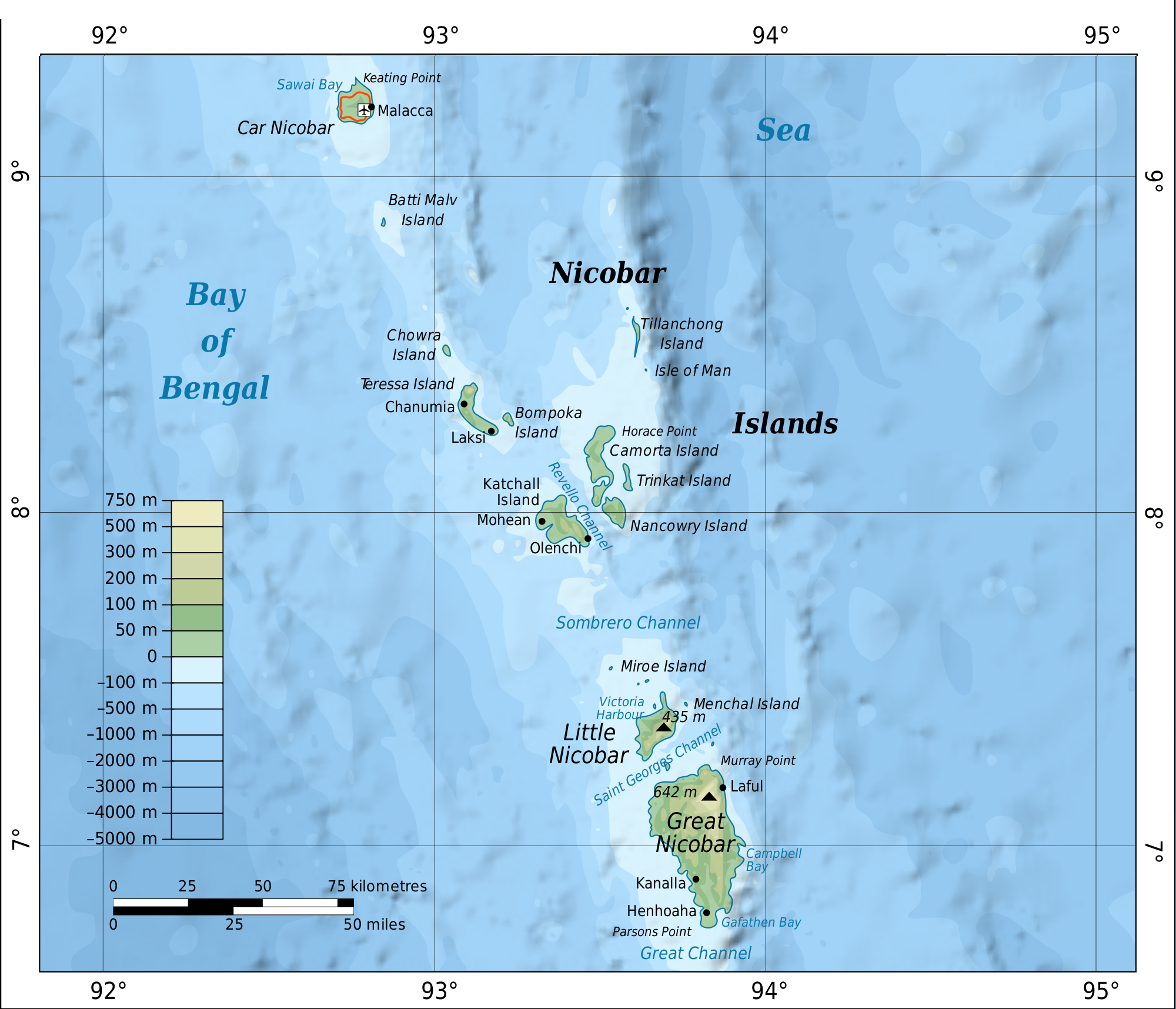
Map

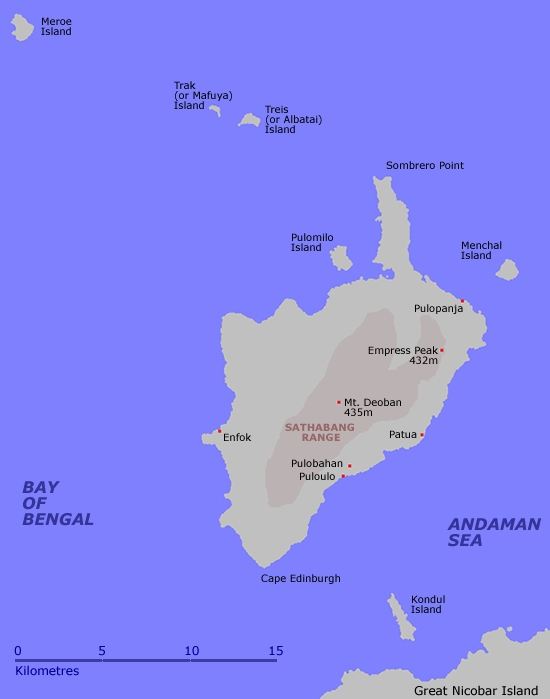
Map 2
