= Teressa language =

Nicobarese language spoken in India

Teressa
- Taih-Long
- Lurö
- Native to: India
- Region: Teressa (Luroo) and Bompoka Islands, Nicobars
- Native speakers: (2,100 cited 2001 census)
- Language family: Austroasiatic: Nicobarese; Chaura–Teressa; Teressa
- Dialects: Bompoka

Language codes
- ISO 639-3: tef
- Glottolog: tere1272
- ELP: Teressa
- Coordinates: 8.24°N 93.13°E

Teressa, or Taih-Long (native name: Lurö) is one of the Nicobarese languages spoken on the Teressa Island of Nicobar Islands in India. Bompoka dialect (Pauhut) is distinct. As of 2001, there are 2,080 speakers.

Teressa belongs to the Nicobarese branch of the Austroasiatic languages in which it forms a subgroup with the Chaura language.
