= Pulomilo Island =

Indian island in the Bay of Bengal

Pulomilo
Native name: Pilomillow, Pulo Milo
- Location within Andaman and Nicobar Islands

Geography
- Location: Bay of Bengal
- Coordinates: 7.4°N 93.69°E
- Archipelago: Nicobar Islands
- Adjacent to: Indian Ocean
- Total islands: 1
- Major islands: Pulomilo
- Area: 0.82 km^{2} (0.32 sq mi)
- Length: 1.3 km (0.81 mi)
- Width: 0.9 km (0.56 mi)
- Coastline: 4.8 km (2.98 mi)
- Highest elevation: 10 m (30 ft)

Administration
- India
- District: Nicobar
- Island group: Nicobar Islands
- Subdivisions of India: Great Nicobar Subdivision
- Taluk: Little Nicobar
- Largest settlement: Pulomilo (pop. 20)

Demographics
- Population: 20 (2014)
- Pop. density: 0/km^{2} (0/sq mi)
- Ethnic groups: Hindu, Nicobarese

Additional information
- Time zone: IST (UTC+5:30)
- PIN: 744301
- Area code: 03192
- ISO code: IN-AN-00
- Official website: www.and.nic.in
- Literacy: 82.35%
- Avg. summer temperature: 32.0 °C (89.6 °F)
- Avg. winter temperature: 28.0 °C (82.4 °F)
- Sex ratio: ♂/♀
- Census code: 35.638.0002.645140
- Official Languages: Hindi, English, Tamil; Southern Nicobarese (regional)

Pulomilo is an island in the Nicobar district of Andaman and Nicobar Islands, India, and is home to a village of the same name. It is located just north of Little Nicobar Island.

== History ==
=== Impact of the 2004 earthquake and tsunami ===
Pulomilo was devastated by the 2004 Indian Ocean earthquake and tsunami. There were initial fears that the entire population had drowned, but later reports showed that the island had been evacuated.

One-hundred-five people were killed in the 2004 disaster on Pulomilo, representing 49.1% of the island's population. Of the 109 survivors, 15 (13.8%) had suffered an injury severe enough to be reportable and almost half (41 individuals) experienced diarrhoea, dysentery, fever, or a respiratory infection.

Besides the human losses, Pulomilo's economy and infrastructure were also devastated. Before the tsunami, Pulomilo residents enjoyed a few hours of electricity each night, and the village accommodated a small police post and radio house staffed on a rotational basis. The tsunami swept away most structures on the island.

Not only were buildings shattered, but the tsunami also severely eroded the villagers' ability to sustain themselves. It destroyed twenty-two of the islanders' outrigger canoes and eight boats, leaving only two embarkations in working order, and killed 823 livestock animals, including 239 pigs belonging to 25 families.

== Geography ==
Pulomilo Island has a size of 0.82 km^{2} (0.32 sq mi). Before the 2004 Indian Ocean earthquake and tsunami, Pulomilo was connected to the Little Nicobar island. After the earthquake and tsunami, it became an island, as most of its land — except a small hilltop — was eroded or submerged. Most of the island is covered in forests of casuarina, pandanus, and coconut palm.

== Administration ==
Pulomilo island belongs to the township of Great Nicobar of Little Nicobar Taluk.

== Economics ==
Pulomilo island's main production crop is coconut in the form of copra. The island has no electricity, and the primary mode of transport is by boat.

=== Tourism ===
Pulomilo also receives a tiny share of the Nicobar tourist trade. One late 20th-century visitor described Pulomilo as a "stunning, magnificent Island" marked by "lush, green, rain-washed coconut plantations" beyond "a golden sandy beach, behind which lay stilted thatched huts"

== Demographics ==
Pulomilo Island's sole settlement is the village of Pulomilo. According to the 2011 census data, Pulomilo has a total population of 20 individuals in 5 households.

The primary language spoken among the residents is the Channai Payuh dialect of Nicobari and most are Christians. The effective literacy rate (i.e. the literacy rate of the population excluding children aged 6 and below) is 82.35%.

== Image gallery ==
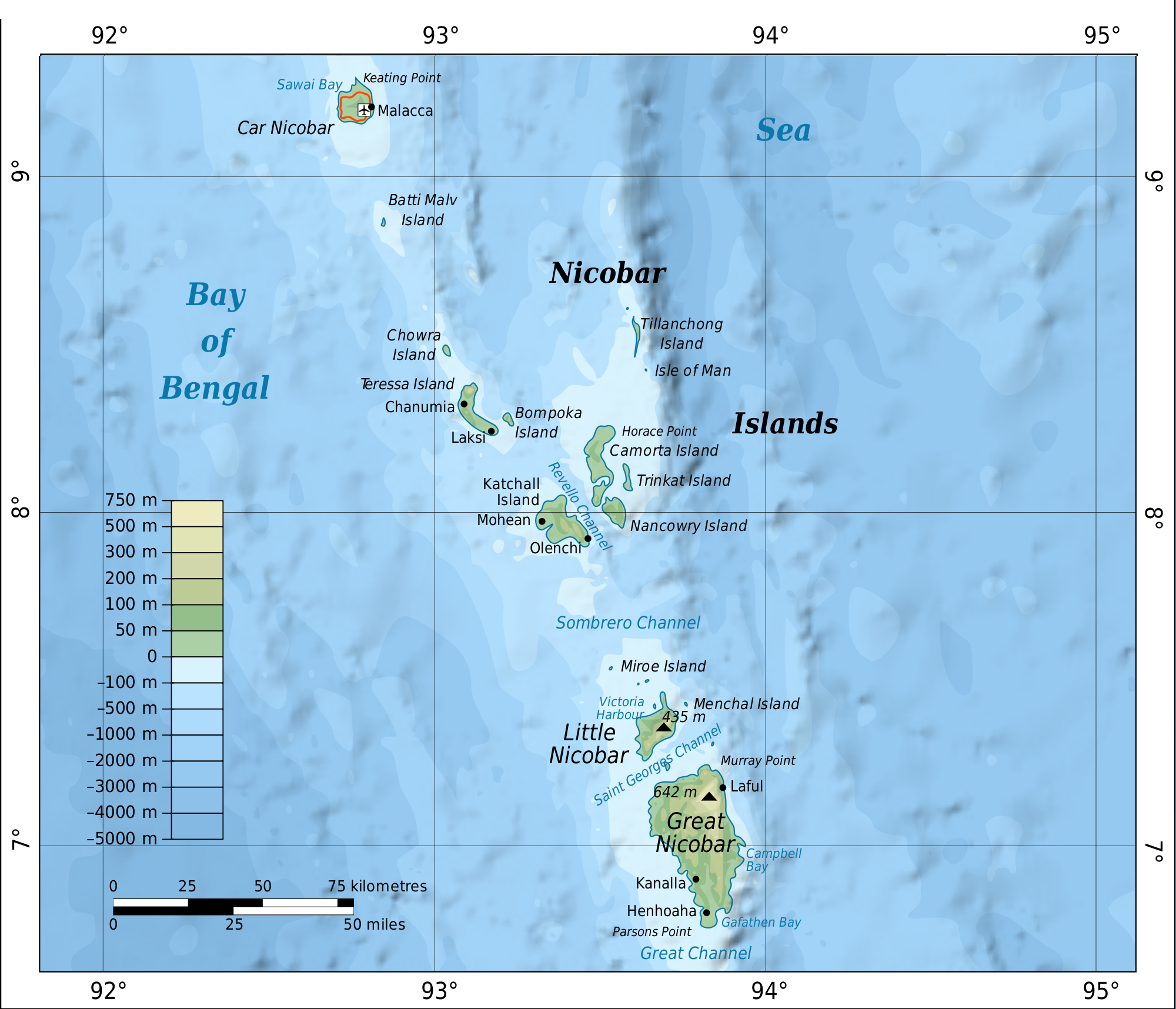
Map

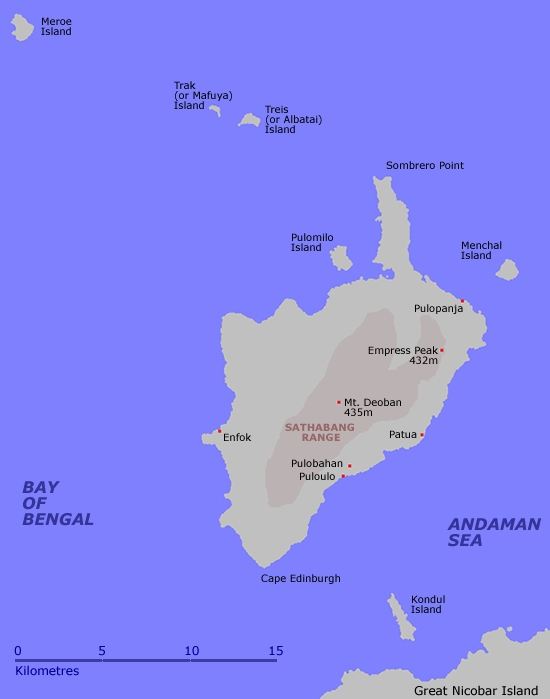
Pulomilo is located to the north-west of the Little Nicobar Island
