= Edward Kutchat =

Indian tribal leader

- Born: Car Nicobar, Andaman and Nicobar Islands, India
- Occupation: Tribal leader
- Awards: Padma Shri

Edward Kutchat was an Indian tribal leader and the Chief of the Tribal Council of Car Nicobar island. He was featured in the media for cooperating with the Indian Government by offering his land for the expansion of airfields in Car Nicobar island, in exchange for the jacket worn by Jawaharlal Nehru, on a visit to the island. He was also reported to have assisted Nicobarese people in promoting their business. The Government of India awarded him the fourth highest civilian honour of Padma Shri in 1989.

== See also ==
- Nehru jacket
- Nicobarese people
