= Katchal language =

Nicobarese language of the Nicobar Islands, India

Katchal
- Tehnu
- Native to: Nicobar Islands, India
- Region: Katchal & formerly Trinket Islands
- Native speakers: (5,700 cited 2001 census)
- Language family: Austroasiatic: Nicobarese; Central; Katchal

Language codes
- ISO 639-3: –
- Glottolog: katc1248 Katchal trin1269 Trinkut

Katchal (Katchall, Katchál, Kachel), or Tehnu (Tēhnyu), is a Nicobarese language spoken in the central Nicobar Islands. Apart from the dialect of Trinket (Trinkat, Trinkut, or Lâfūl), it is not mutually intelligible with the other Central Nicobarese languages. The population of Trinket was evacuated to Nancowry and Camorta after the 2004 tsunami, and can be expected to disappear as speakers assimilate.
