= Camorta language =

Nicobarese language of India

Camorta
- Kamorta
- Native to: Nicobar Islands, India
- Region: Camorta Island
- Native speakers: (3,400 cited 2001 census)
- Language family: Austroasiatic: Nicobarese; Central; Camorta

Language codes
- ISO 639-3: (covered by Central Nicobarese ncb)
- Glottolog: camo1249

Camorta (Kamorta) is a Nicobarese language spoken in the central Nicobar Islands. It is not mutually intelligible with the other Central Nicobarese languages.

It is considered by Ethnologue as a dialect of the Central Nicobarese language.
