= Afra Bay =

- village
- Location in Andaman and Nicobar Islands, India Afra Bay (India)
- Coordinates: 7°11′10″N 93°44′05″E
- Country: India
- State: Andaman and Nicobar Islands
- District: Nicobar
- Tehsil: Great Nicobar
- Elevation: 2 m (6.6 ft)

Population (2011)
  - Total: 138
- Time zone: UTC+5:30 (IST)
- 2011 census code: 645166

Afra Bay is a village in the Nicobar district of Andaman and Nicobar Islands, India. It is located in the Great Nicobar Subdivision on Little Nicobar Tehsil.

== Demographics ==
According to the 2011 census of India, Afra Bay has 29 households. The effective literacy rate (i.e. the literacy rate of population excluding children aged 6 and below) is 57.14%.

Demographics (2011 Census)
	Total	Male	Female
Population	138	72	66
Children aged below 6 years	19	8	11
Scheduled caste	0	0	0
Scheduled tribe	135	69	66
Literates	68	45	23
Workers (all)	12	11	1
Main workers (total)	6	6	0
Main workers: Cultivators	0	0	0
Main workers: Agricultural labourers	1	1	0
Main workers: Household industry workers	0	0	0
Main workers: Other	5	5	0
Marginal workers (total)	6	5	1
Marginal workers: Cultivators	0	0	0
Marginal workers: Agricultural labourers	2	1	1
Marginal workers: Household industry workers	0	0	0
Marginal workers: Others	4	4	0
Non-workers	126	61	65
