= Choura =

Coordinates: 22°59′N 80°55′E

- Village
- Interactive map of Choura
- Country: India
- State: Punjab
- District: Gurdaspur
- Tehsil: Dera Baba Nanak
- Region: Majha

Government
  - Type: Panchayat raj
  - Body: Gram panchayat

Area
  - Total: 222 ha (550 acres)

Population (2011)
  - Total: 538; 296/242 ♂/♀
  - Scheduled Castes: 32; 16/16 ♂/♀
  - Total Households: 90

Languages
  - Official: Punjabi
- Time zone: UTC+5:30 (IST)
- Telephone: 01871
- ISO 3166 code: IN-PB
- Website: gurdaspur.nic.in

Choura is a village in Dera Baba Nanak in Gurdaspur district of Punjab State, India. It is located 10 kilometres (6.2 mi) from sub district headquarter and 40 kilometres (25 mi) from district headquarter. The village is administrated by Sarpanch an elected representative of the village.

== Demography ==
As of 2011, the village has a total number of 90 houses and a population of 538 of which 296 are males while 242 are females. According to the report published by Census India in 2011, out of the total population of the village 32 people are from Schedule Caste and the village does not have any Schedule Tribe population so far.

== See also ==
- List of villages in India
