= Nancowry language =

Nicobarese language of the Nicobar Islands, India

Nancowry
- Nang-kauri
- Mūöt
- Pronunciation: [mɯːət]
- Native to: Nicobar Islands, India
- Region: Nancowry Island (Mūöt)
- Native speakers: (930 cited 2001 census)
- Language family: Austroasiatic: Nicobarese; Central; Nancowry

Language codes
- ISO 639-3: –
- Glottolog: nanc1247
- Muot is classified as Critically Endangered according to the UNESCO Atlas of the World's Languages in Danger

Nancowry (Nancoury, Nankwari, Mūöt) is a Nicobarese language spoken on the Nancowry Island in the central Nicobar Islands. It is not mutually intelligible with the other Central Nicobarese languages, and is distantly related to Vietnamese and Khmer.

== Phonology ==
=== Consonants ===
	Labial	Alveolar/ Retroflex	Palatal	Velar	Glottal
Plosive	p	t̪	c	k	ʔ
Nasal	m	n̪	ɲ	ŋ	
Fricative	f ʋ	s			h
Tap		ɾ			
Approximant		l	j		

- The labial glide written variously v and w is written ʋ.

=== Vowels ===
	Front	Central	Back
Close	i	ɯ	u
Close-mid	e		o
Open-mid	ɛ	ə	ɔ
Open	æ	a	

== Vocabulary ==
Paul Sidwell (2017) published in ICAAL 2017 conference on Nicobarese languages.

Word	Nancowry	proto-Nicobarese
hot	táɲ	*taɲ
four	koan	*foan
child	kúan	*kuːn
lip	manúɲ	*manuːɲ
dog	ʔám	*ʔam
night	hatə́m	*hatəːm
male	kóɲ	*koːɲ
ear	náŋ	*naŋ
one	hĩaŋ	*hiaŋ
belly	wíaŋ	*ʔac
sun	hɛ́ŋ	-
sweet	síaŋ	-
deep	cijáw	-
thigh	pulóʔ	-
python	tulán	-
road	kají	-
yawn	hiŋáp	-
centipede	kaʔiáp	-
dream	ʔinfuá	-
tongue	kaliták	-
overflow	yuait-nga	*roac
nose	moah	*moah
breast	toah	*toah
to cough	oōàh	*ʔoah
arm	koâl	*koal
in, inside	oal, òl	*ʔoal
four	fōan	*foan
elbow	det-ongkēang	*keaŋ

== Morphology ==
Presence of a coda-copy-infixation system. Stock of lexical roots is reduced by active word taboo and hence rely on derivation extensively.

- kóɲ - 'male, husband'
- ʔumkóɲ -'to turn into a man'
- mumkóɲ - 'eunuch'
- ʔinkóɲtet - 'widower'
- kóɲu - 'to marry, to have a man'
- kamóɲu - 'married women'

Shared morphological alternations: the old AA causative has two allomorphs, prefix ha- with monosyllabic stems, infix -um- in disyllabic stems (note: *p > h onset in unstressed σ).

- ŋok - 'to eat' / haŋok 'to feed'
- cim - 'to cry' / hacim 'to make someone cry'
- lapəʔ - 'pretty' / lumpəʔ 'to make someone pretty'
- karuʔ - 'large' / kumdruʔ 'to enlarge'

Pronouns
Person	Singular	Dual	Plural
1st	cə̃ˑ ~ cɯ̃ˑə	xãˑʔ (incl.) ci ʔaˑj (excl.)	xeˑʔ (incl.) ci ʔəˑj (excl.)
2nd	mɛ̃ˑ	ʔinãˑ	ʔifeˑ
3rd	ʔə̃ˑn	ʔunãˑ	ʔufeˑ
Dem- Prox	nɛˑʔ	-	ʔiˑn
Dem- Dist	ʔãˑn	ŋãˑŋ	kəˑʔ
