= John Richardson (bishop of Car Nicobar) =

Indian Anglican bishop and politician (1896–1978)

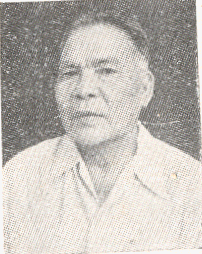
John Richardson in 1952

John Richardson (6 June 1896 – 3 June 1978) was an Indian Anglican bishop and politician.

== Childhood and youth ==
Richardson was born into a Car Nicobarese family and named Ha Chev Ka. In 1906 he was sent to Burma, to attend school at S.P.G. Mission in Mandalay. He was confirmed by Field Marshal Archibald Montgomery-Massingberd's father at S.P.G. Mission. In Rangoon Richardson became the first Nicobarese to be ordained as an Anglican priest. He returned to Car Nicobar and worked as a teacher in 1912. He was married in 1913.

He served as Honorary Tehsildar between 1925 and 1945. He worked as Conservator of Port between 1920 and 1933. Richardson authored the first Car Nicobarese language primer in 1923, using a modified version of Latin script.

== Second World War ==
During the Japanese occupation of the Andaman and Nicobar islands, Richardson emerged as the foremost leader of the Nicobarese community. Initially Richardson was designed as 'Chief Headman' of the island by the Japanese, ordering him to provide supply of labourers. But soon thereafter he fell out of grace with the occupying forces. He was jailed and tortured. Two of his sons were killed. Richardson himself was sentenced to death twice. After the first death sentence the community threatened the Japanese troops with rebellion. Richardson was awaiting the execution of death penalty the second time when the war abruptly ended. In the midst of the war, Richardson married a second time on 6 May 1943.

Richardson founded a cooperative movement in 1947. He was also the founder of the Nicobarese Athletic Association. He instituted village councils and tribal councils across the island.

== Bishop ==
On 15 January 1950 Richardson was named Assistant Bishop with special care for the Andaman and Nicobar Islands of the Diocese of Calcutta, following a unanimous decision of the General Council of the Anglican Church in India, Burma and Ceylon.

== Parliamentarian ==
In 1952 Richardson was nominated by the President of India to represent the Andaman and Nicobar Islands in the 1st Lok Sabha (the lower house of the parliament of India). At the time he was the sole Anglican bishop to have served as member of the lower house of a national parliament.

== Later years ==
Richardson lived in Mus village. Richardson received Padma Shri medal in 1965. Richardson served as Assistant Bishop of Calcutta (for Car Nicobar) until 1966, when the new Diocese of Andaman and Nicobar was erected. He became an assistant bishop of that diocese and served until 1977. He translated the bible into Nicobarese, which was published in 1970.

He was awarded Padma Bhusan in 1975. Richardson died on 3 June 1978.

== Legacy ==
After his death, his church became a point of pilgrimage. The local population erected a statue of him. In February 1985 President Zail Singh paid his respect to Richardson during a visit to the islands, as did Prime Minister Rajiv Gandhi during a visit in January 1987.

Richardson's statue and church were badly damaged in the 2004 Indian Ocean tsunami. One of Richardson's sons and one of his grandsons died in the tsunami. The local community later rebuilt the church. A new statue was inaugurated in Car Nicobar in 2011, unveiled by the Lieutenant Governor Bhopinder Singh.

There is a hospital on Car Nicobar named 'Bishop John Richardson District Hospital'.

Richardson's wife Ethel died on 28 January 2016 at the age of 105 years and 192 days
