= Southern Nicobarese language =

Language spoken on Southern Nicobar Islands

Southern Nicobarese
- Sambelong
- Native to: India
- Region: Little Nicobar, Great Nicobar
- Native speakers: (7,500 cited 2001 census)
- Language family: Austroasiatic: Nicobarese; Southern; Southern Nicobarese
- Dialects: Great Nicobarese; Little Nicobarese

Language codes
- ISO 639-3: nik
- Glottolog: sout2689
- ELP: Southern Nicobarese
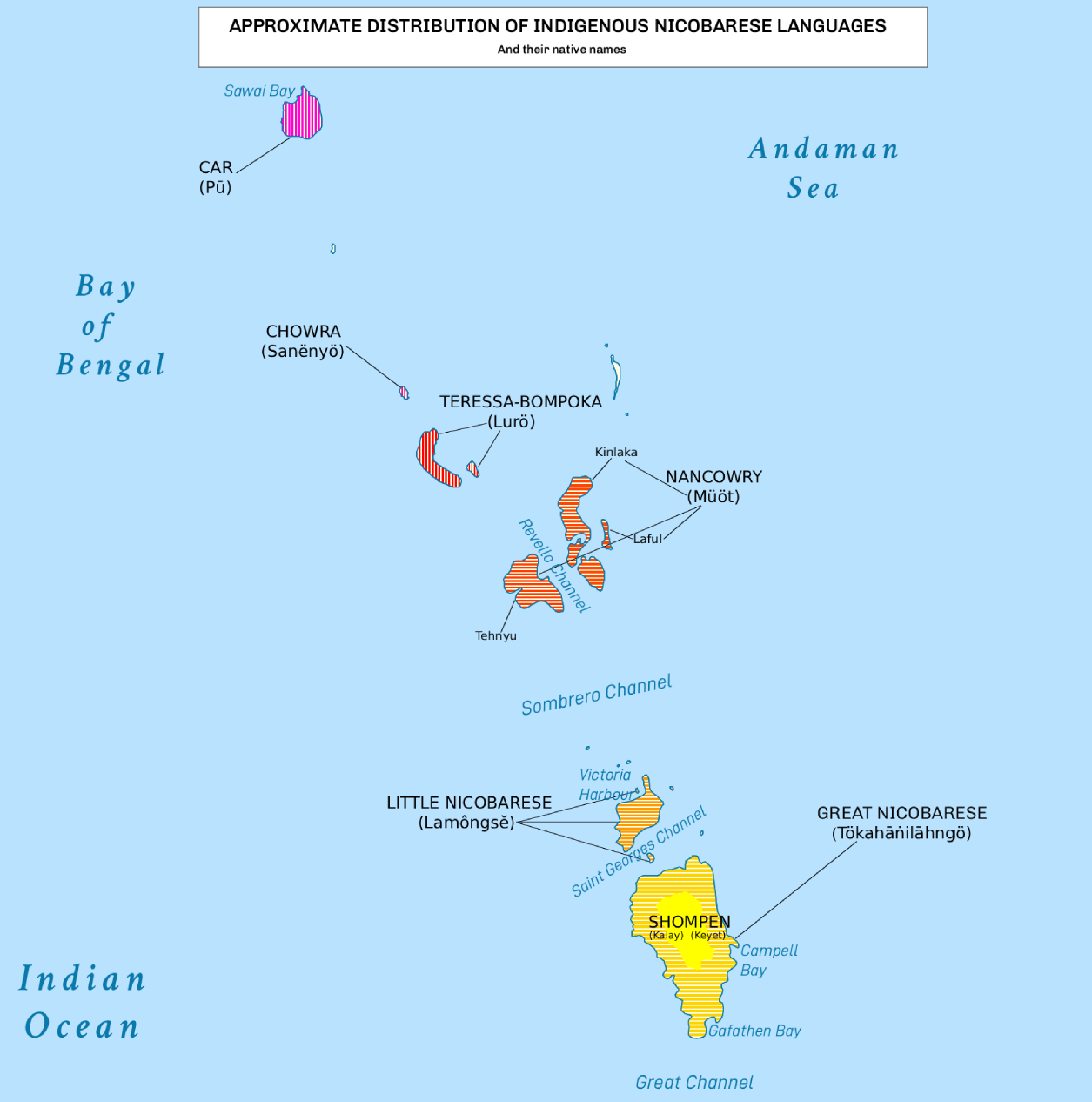
- Great Nicobarese and Little Nicobarese

- Location in the Bay of Bengal.
- Coordinates: 6.83°N 93.80°E

Southern Nicobarese is a Nicobarese language, spoken on the Southern Nicobar Islands of Little Nicobar (Lamôngsĕ), Great Nicobar (Tökahāṅilā), and small neighboring islands, Kondul and Pulo Milo (Milo Island) each of which have own dialects.

== Distribution ==
Parmanand Lal (1977:23) reported 11 Nicobarese villages with 192 people in all, located mostly along the western coast of Great Nicobar Island. Pulo-babi village was the site of Lal's extensive ethnographic study.

- Batadiya
- Chinge
- Ehengloy
- Kakaiyu
- Kashindon
- Kopenhaiyen
- Koye
- Pulo-babi
- Pulo-baha
- Pulo-kunyi
- Pulo-pucca

Lal (1977:104) also reported the presence of several Shompen villages in the interior of Great Nicobar Island.

- Dakade (10 km northeast of Pulo-babi, a Nicobarese village; 15 persons and 4 huts)
- Puithey (16 km southeast of Pulo-babi)
- Tataiya (inhabited by the Dogmar River Shompen group, who had moved from Tataiya to Pulo-kunyi between 1960 and 1977)

== Vocabulary ==
Paul Sidwell (2017) published in ICAAL 2017 conference on Nicobarese languages.

Word	Southern Nicobarese	proto-Nicobarese
hot	tait	*taɲ
four	fôat	*foan
child	kōˑan	*kuːn
lip	paṅ-nōˑin	*manuːɲ
dog	âm	*ʔam
night	hatòm	*hatəːm
male	(otāˑha)	*koːɲ
ear	nâng	*naŋ
one	heg	*hiaŋ
belly	wīˑang	*ʔac
sun	hēg	-
sweet	shai(t)	-

== See also ==
- Shompen language, also spoken on Great Nicobar
