= Chaura language =

Austroasiatic language of Southeast Asia

Chaura
- Tutet
- Sanënyö
- Native to: India
- Region: Chaura Island (Sanenya), Nicobars
- Native speakers: (5,900 cited 2001 census)
- Language family: Austroasiatic: Nicobarese; Chaura–Teressa; Chaura

Language codes
- ISO 639-3: crv
- Glottolog: chau1258
- ELP: Chaura
- Coordinates: 8.46°N 93.03°E

Chaura, or Tutet (Sanënyö) is one of the Nicobarese languages spoken on Chaura Island in the Nicobar Islands.
