= Nancowry Island =

Island in the central part of the Nicobar Islands chain

Native name: Mūöt Nickname: Nankovri
- Location within Andaman and Nicobar Islands Location within Bay of Bengal

Geography
- Location: Bay of Bengal
- Coordinates: 7.98°N 93.55°E
- Archipelago: Nicobar Islands
- Adjacent to: Indian Ocean
- Area: 47 km^{2} (18 sq mi)
- Length: 11.2 km (6.96 mi)
- Width: 7.5 km (4.66 mi)
- Coastline: 47 km (29.2 mi)
- Highest elevation: 162 m (531 ft)

Administration
- India
- District: Nicobar
- Island group: Nicobar Islands
- Subdivisions of India: Nancowry Subdivision
- Taluk: Nancowry tehsil
- Largest settlement: Mayo (Malacca) Point (pop. 516)

Demographics
- Population: 1019 (2011)
- Pop. density: 21.7/km^{2} (56.2/sq mi)
- Ethnic groups: Hindu, Nicobarese

Additional information
- Time zone: IST (UTC+5:30)
- PIN: 744301
- Telephone code: 03192
- ISO code: IN-AN-00
- Official website: www.and.nic.in
- Literacy: 84.4%
- Avg. summer temperature: 32.0 °C (89.6 °F)
- Avg. winter temperature: 28.0 °C (82.4 °F)
- Sex ratio: ♂/♀
- Census Code: 35.638.0002
- Official Languages: Hindi, English, Tamil; Nancowry (regional)

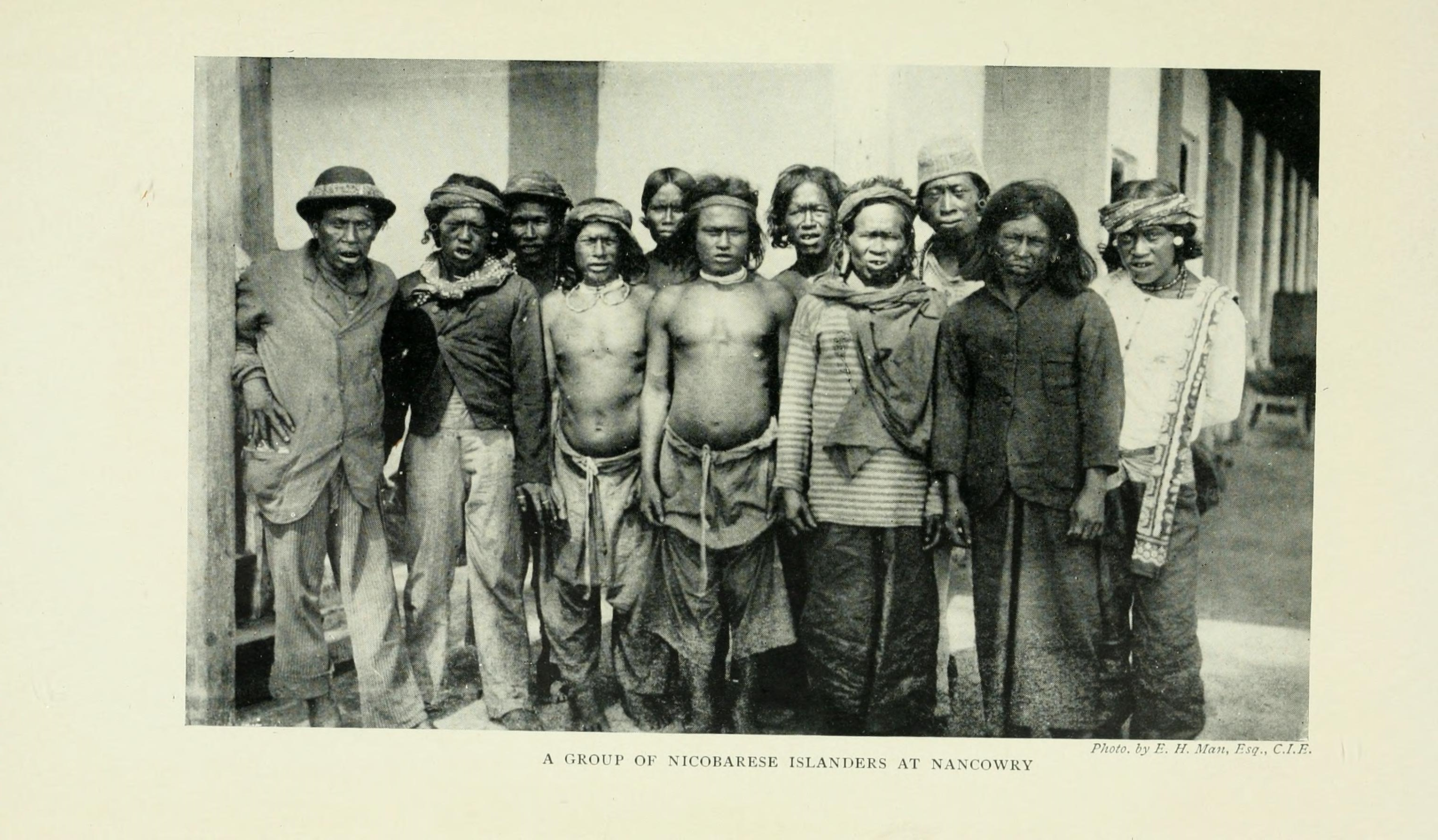
The people of Nancowry Island in 1915

Nancowry (Nancowry language: Mūöt, Hindi: नन्कोव्री Nankovrī) is an island in the central part of the Nicobar Islands chain, located in the northeast Indian Ocean between the Bay of Bengal and the Andaman Sea.

== History ==
In 1755, the government of Denmark formally claimed sovereignty over Nicobars, under the name Frederiksøerne ("Frederik Islands") and encouraged a mission established by the Moravian Brethren of Herrnhut. The Danes established a short-lived colony on the island which they named Ny Sjælland ("New Zealand").

Along with Kamorta Island, which lies just to the north, Nancowry Island forms the "magnificent land-locked" Nancowry Harbour, used by European sailors since at least the 17th century and described as "one of the safest natural harbours in the world" (). The harbour was apparently used as a base for piracy; in 1868, the British Navy entered the harbour in some force, destroying suspected pirate ships.

=== 2004 tsunami ===
The island, like many others in the Nicobar and Andaman islands, was severely affected by tsunamis generated by the 2004 Indian Ocean earthquake. According to reports from the Andaman and Nicobar Inspector General of Police, S.B. Deol, the Nancowry group of islands were among the worst-hit islands in the chain, with thousands missing and presumed dead. Post-tsunami satellite photos, and government situation reports indicate that while portions of Nancowry Island were affected, the adjoining islands of Katchall and Kamorta were more severely overrun. As of January 18, 2005, the government reported only 1 dead and 3 missing from Nancowry island, but 51 dead and 387 missing from Kamorta, and 345 dead and 4310 missing from Katchall.

== Geography ==
Nancowry Island has an area of 47 km^{2}, and located 160 km south-southeast of Car Nicobar, the northernmost Nicobar island. Nancowry, like the Nicobar islands generally, is under the sovereignty of the nation of India. It is also part of the Nicobar and Andaman Tribal Reserve Area, which bars non-native people from visiting or conducting business on the island without permission in hopes of preserving the threatened native communities that live there.

== People, Culture and Religion ==
Nancowry Island, part of the southern islands in the central Nicobar group, holds significant importance. Its inhabitants, the Nicobarese, have a lifestyle deeply connected to nature. Their diet primarily includes sea fish, wild pigs, edible roots, coconuts, bananas, and pandanus. However, noticeable changes are taking place due to frequent contact with the mainlanders. The Andaman & Nicobar Administration recently unveiled a development draft for Nancowry and nine other islands. These plans aim to preserve ecosystems while promoting sustainable tourism infrastructure, incorporating maps that designate areas for eco-tourism, conservation, and business activities.

The Nicobarese family on Nancowry Island typically consists of a husband, wife, and children, though extended family members like cousins and distant relatives are often part of the household. Each member plays a vital role in the community's social and economic welfare. Traditionally, the Nicobarese practiced animism and held beliefs in spirits. However, exposure to Christianity and increased interaction with mainlanders have gradually influenced and transformed their ancestral beliefs.

== Climate ==
The island features undulating meadows and hilly, grass-covered terrain. Sea breezes help to moderate its tropical climate. The typical temperature ranges between 23 °C and 30 °C, or roughly 70 °F and 80 °F. An average of 3,000 to 3,800 mm of rain falls on the area each year; the monsoon seasons—the northeast monsoon from October to December and the southwest monsoon from May to September—bring more rainfall.

Climate data for Nancowry Island (1991–2020, extremes 1952–2012)
Month	Jan	Feb	Mar	Apr	May	Jun	Jul	Aug	Sep	Oct	Nov	Dec	Year
Record high °C (°F)	34.4 (93.9)	36.4 (97.5)	35.6 (96.1)	39.2 (102.6)	38.6 (101.5)	34.1 (93.4)	32.7 (90.9)	33.0 (91.4)	34.7 (94.5)	36.2 (97.2)	34.1 (93.4)	36.0 (96.8)	39.2 (102.6)
Mean daily maximum °C (°F)	31.1 (88.0)	31.6 (88.9)	32.3 (90.1)	32.8 (91.0)	31.4 (88.5)	30.7 (87.3)	30.2 (86.4)	30.1 (86.2)	29.9 (85.8)	30.1 (86.2)	30.4 (86.7)	30.6 (87.1)	30.9 (87.6)
Mean daily minimum °C (°F)	24.3 (75.7)	24.8 (76.6)	25.1 (77.2)	25.4 (77.7)	25.1 (77.2)	25.3 (77.5)	25.0 (77.0)	24.7 (76.5)	24.4 (75.9)	24.3 (75.7)	24.4 (75.9)	24.4 (75.9)	24.8 (76.6)
Record low °C (°F)	18.4 (65.1)	19.0 (66.2)	18.2 (64.8)	19.6 (67.3)	18.9 (66.0)	19.2 (66.6)	19.2 (66.6)	19.0 (66.2)	17.8 (64.0)	18.6 (65.5)	18.8 (65.8)	18.7 (65.7)	17.8 (64.0)
Average rainfall mm (inches)	141.4 (5.57)	67.0 (2.64)	68.4 (2.69)	104.6 (4.12)	298.5 (11.75)	261.6 (10.30)	238.8 (9.40)	205.6 (8.09)	247.8 (9.76)	243.4 (9.58)	292.3 (11.51)	242.2 (9.54)	2,411.7 (94.95)
Average rainy days	6.4	3.9	3.7	6.6	13.9	12.8	13.2	12.5	13.8	14.4	14.3	10.4	125.8
Average relative humidity (%) (at 17:30 IST)	81	79	79	79	84	84	85	85	87	87	87	84	83
Source: India Meteorological Department

== Administration ==
The island belongs to Nancowry tehsil of the township of Nancowry.

== Image gallery ==
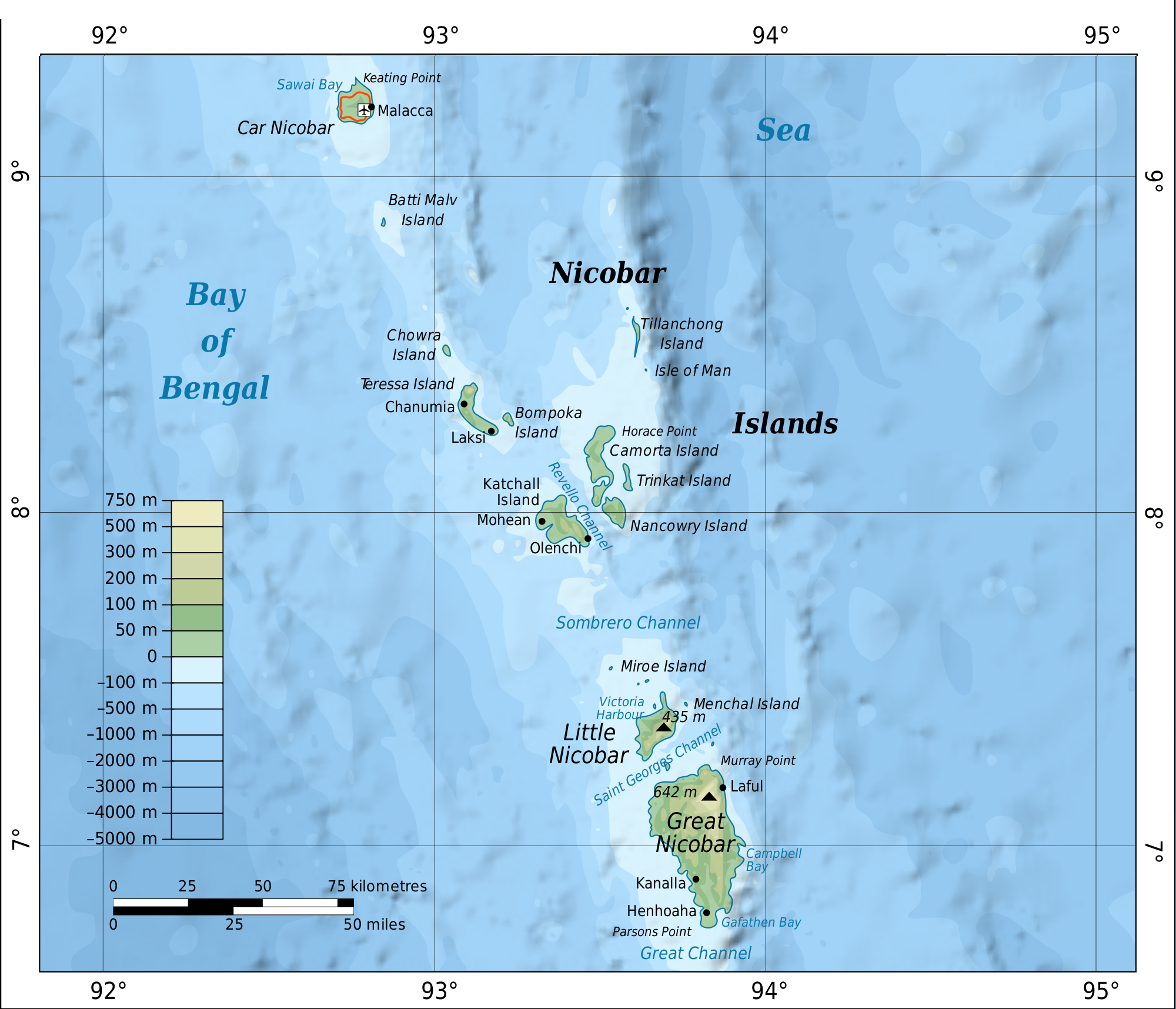
Map of the Nicobar Islands

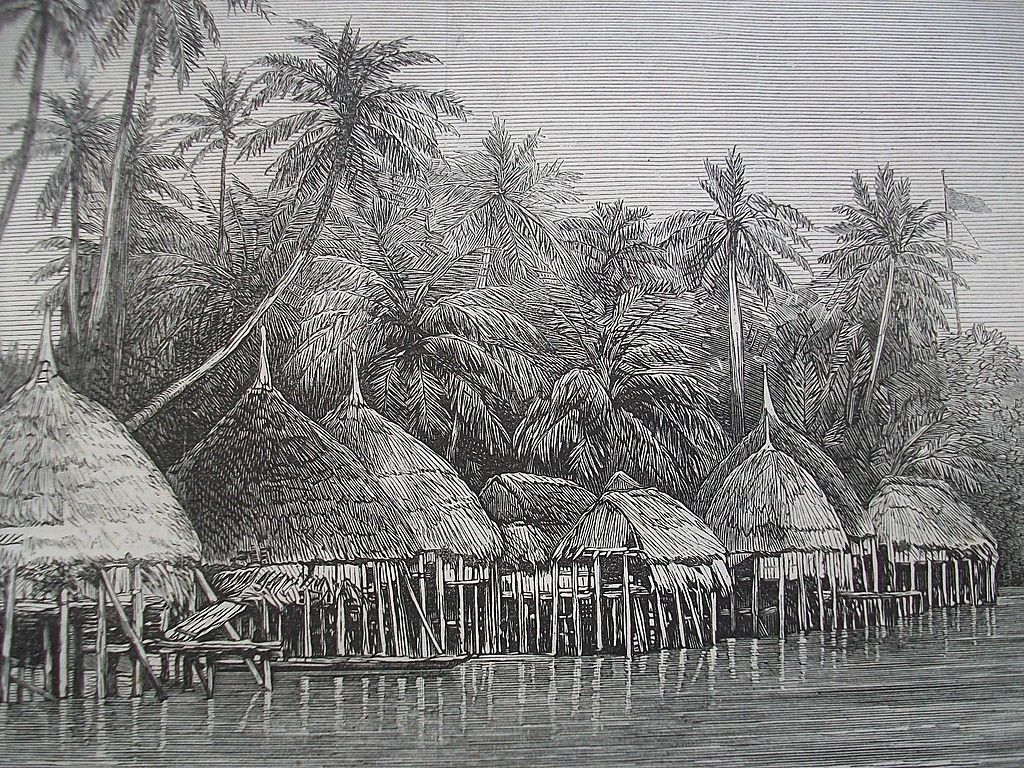
Malacca village 1870

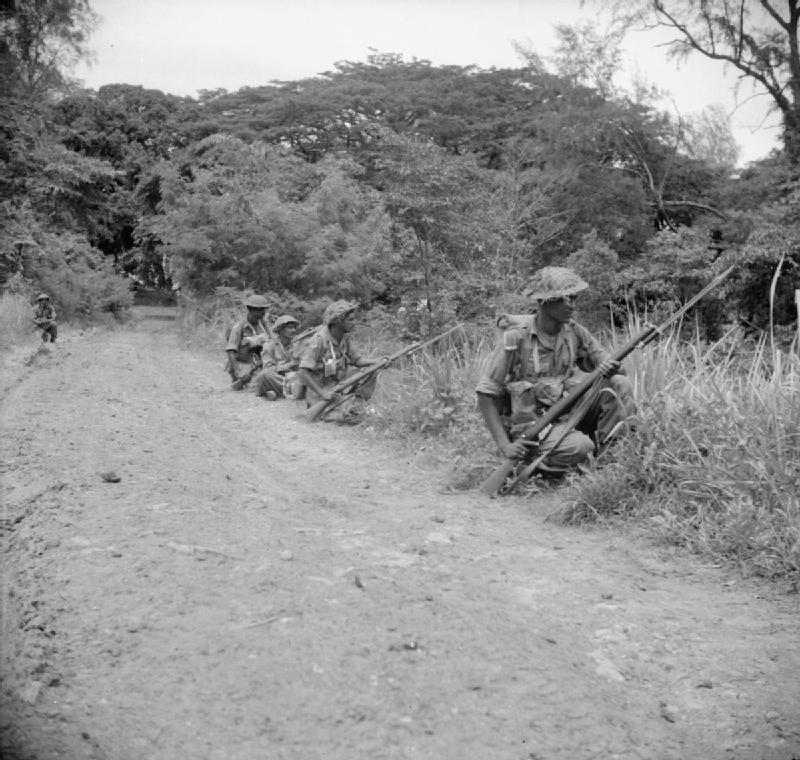
Rajput Regiment on patrol during World War II
