= Car language =

Austroasiatic language spoken in the Nicobar Islands, India

Car
- Pū, Pu
- Pronunciation: [puː]
- Native to: India
- Region: Nicobar Islands
- Native speakers: 37,000 (2005)
- Language family: Austroasiatic: Nicobarese; Car
- Writing system: Latin script

Language codes
- ISO 639-3: caq
- Glottolog: carn1240
- ELP: Car Nicobarese
- Pū is classified as Critically Endangered according to the UNESCO Atlas of the World's Languages in Danger

- Location within Andaman and Nicobar Islands Location within Bay of Bengal
- Coordinates: 9.19°N 92.77°E

Car (Pū) is the most widely spoken Nicobarese language of the Nicobar Islands in the Bay of Bengal.

Although a member of the Austroasiatic language family, it is typologically much more akin to nearby Austronesian languages such as Nias and Acehnese, with which it forms a linguistic area. Car is a VOS language and somewhat agglutinative. There is a quite complicated verbal suffix system with some infixes, as well as distinct genitive and "interrogative" cases for nouns and pronouns.

== Phonology ==
=== Consonants ===
	Labial	Alveolar/ Retroflex	Palatal	Velar	Glottal
Plosive	p	t	c	k	ʔ
Nasal	m	n	ɲ	ŋ	
Fricative	f v	s			h
Tap		ɾ ɽ			
Approximant		l	j		

- The alveolar flap can typically be pre-stopped. Before a voiceless consonant, its pre-articulation is voiceless as [ᵗɾ], and elsewhere it is voiced [ᵈɾ].

=== Vowels ===
	Front	Central	Back
Close	i	ɨ	u
Close-mid	e	ɤ	o
Open-mid	ɛ	ə	ɔ
Open	(æ)	a	

- /æ/ only occurs in English loanwords.
- Vowel sounds are also typically short when occurring before an /h/.

== Morphosyntax ==
Shared morphological alternations: the old AA causative has two allomorphs, prefix ha- with monosyllabic stems, infix -um- in disyllabic stems (note: *p > h onset in unstressed σ).

- ɲa - 'to eat' / haɲaː 'to feed'
- pɯɲ - 'to cry' / hapɯɲ-ɲɔː 'to make cry'
- kucik - 'be palatable' / kumcik 'to taste'
- kale - 'brave' / kumle 'bravery'

Car is a precategorial language. Any content word can serve for either referential, predicative, or attributive functions. Lexical items are used predicatively in predicational and equative sentences without being accompanied by a copular or existential verb; neither does Car possess.

taŋɛ́ʔ=ʔən ŋih
bone=3SG.VIS.NHUM this.SG.NHUM
'This is a bone'

The differential argument marking system in Car only works with lexical items. Pronominals and proper nominals are not marked.

fɤ́ŋ-kə-ɾɛ cin
burn-INTR-REFL I
'I burn myself (accidentally).'

In intransitive clauses, the lexical S argument (always requires a demonstrative) is cross-referenced.

húʔ-a=jin mɛ ɲiʔ
cry-STAT=3PL.VIS.HUM that.PL child
'The children are crying.'

In transitive clause, the lexical P argument is indexed in the predicate, while the A argument is not.

ha-cát-ŋɛ́n=ʔək lípəɾɛ cin
CAUS-lost-away=3SG.NONVIS.PST book 1SG
'I lost the book.'

Thus, Car is an ergative language with an unusual marked absolutive pattern, paralleling some nearby Austronesian languages such as Nias and Enggano, hinting at a possible point of contact-driven influence from Austronesian. However, other than the differential marking system, the similarities between them are unclear.

== Vocabulary ==
Paul Sidwell (2017) published in ICAAL 2017 conference on Nicobarese languages.

Word	Car	proto-Nicobarese
hot	taɲ	*taɲ
four	fɛːn	*foan
child	kuːn	*kuːn
lip	(minuh)	*manuːɲ
dog	ʔam	*ʔam
night	hatəːm	*hatəːm
male	koːɲ	*koːɲ
ear	naŋ	*naŋ
one	heŋ	*hiaŋ
belly	(ʔac)	*ʔac
sun	(tavuːj)	-
sweet	(pacaːka)	-
overflow	tareːci	*roac
nose	mɛh	*moah
breast	tɛh	*toah
to cough	ʔɛhɛ	*ʔoah
arm	kɛl	*koal
in, inside	ʔɛl	*ʔoal
elbow	sikɔŋ	*keaŋ
