= Nicobarese languages =

Subgroup of the Austroasiatic language family

Nicobarese
- Nicobaric
- Geographic distribution: Nicobar Islands, India
- Ethnicity: Nicobarese people
- Linguistic classification: Austroasiatic: Nicobarese
- Proto-language: Proto-Nicobarese
- Subdivisions: Car; Chaura–Teressa; Central-Southern

Language codes
- Glottolog: nico1262
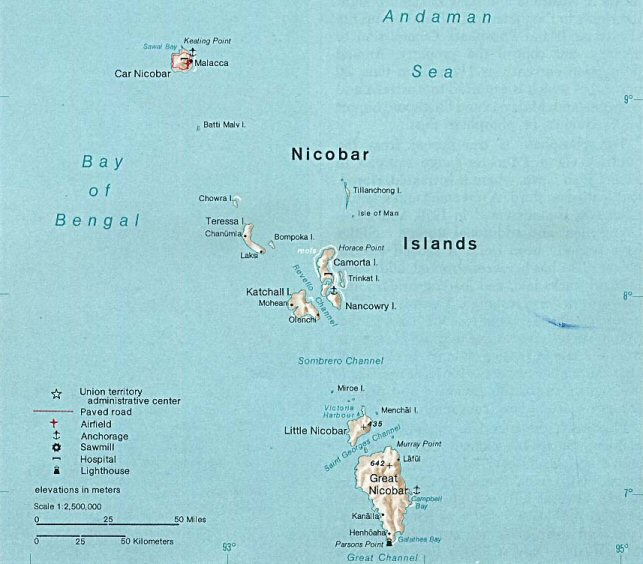
- The Nicobar Islands. Car is at top.

- Nicobarese

The Nicobarese languages or Nicobaric languages, form an isolated group of about half a dozen closely related Austroasiatic languages, spoken by most of the inhabitants of the Nicobar Islands administered by the Indian Republic. They have a total of about 30,000 speakers (22,100 native). Most Nicobarese speakers speak the Car language. Paul Sidwell (2015:179) considers the Nicobarese languages to subgroup with Aslian.

The Nicobarese languages appear to be related to the Shompen language of the indigenous inhabitants of the interior of Great Nicobar Island (Blench & Sidwell 2011), which is usually considered a separate branch of Austroasiatic. However, Paul Sidwell (2017) classifies Shompen as a Southern Nicobaric language rather than as a separate branch of Austroasiatic.

== Typology ==
The morphological similarities between Nicobarese and Austronesian languages have been used as evidence for the Austric hypothesis (Reid 1994). Weber (2025) also noted typological similarities between Nicobarese and Austronesian that are absent in other Austroasiatic branches, and suggested that Nicobarese may have an Austronesian substrate.

In general, the Nicobarese languages display verb-initial word orders, and have elaborate paradigmatic agreement systems. They also have suffixing, which is uncommon in the Mainland Southeast Asia linguistic area.

Nancowry, Chaura, Teressa show nominative-accusative alignment in marking and agreement. Car Nicobarese however displays a highly eccentric ergative alignment and split ergativity (based on word order). In contrast with nearly entirely of the ergative languages of the world where marking agreement with the ergative (A) arguments is the norm, in Car Nicobarese the subjects (S) of intransitive predicates and the patients (P) of transitive predicates often receive overt markings and agreement instead. This marked absolutive pattern is illustrated by following examples:

1. Intransitive S

cɨ́ʔ-t-a=ʔən ŋih ta-hɛ́l
short-toward-STAT=3SG this.SG.NHUM PTCP-flow
'This [flowing thing] river is short.'

2. Transitive P of V-P-A (agreement but no case marking)

ha-cát-ŋɛ́n=ʔək lípəɾɛ cin
CAUS-lost-away=3SG.NONVIS.PST book 1SG
'I lost the book.'

3. Transitive P of V-A-P (case marked but no agreement)

lakúk-ə=tiʔ cin tə=pilɤ́n
break-ANTIPASS=hand 1SG ABS=bottle
'I broke a bottle.'

== Languages ==
From north to south, the Nicobaric languages are:

- Car: Car (Pū)
- Chaura–Teressa: Chaura (Tutet/Sanënyö), Teressa (Taih-Long/Lurö)
- Central: Nancowry (Nang-kauri/Mūöt), Camorta, Katchal (Tehnu)
- Southern: Southern Nicobarese (Sambelong), Shompen (Shom Peng)

== Classification ==
=== Sidwell (2017) ===
Paul Sidwell (2017) classifies the Nicobaric languages as follows.

- Nicobaric
  - Car
  - Chaura–Teressa
    - Teressa, Chaura
  - Central-Southern
    - Central: Nancowry, Camorta, Katchall
    - Southern: Southern Nicobarese, Shompen

=== Sidwell (2022) ===
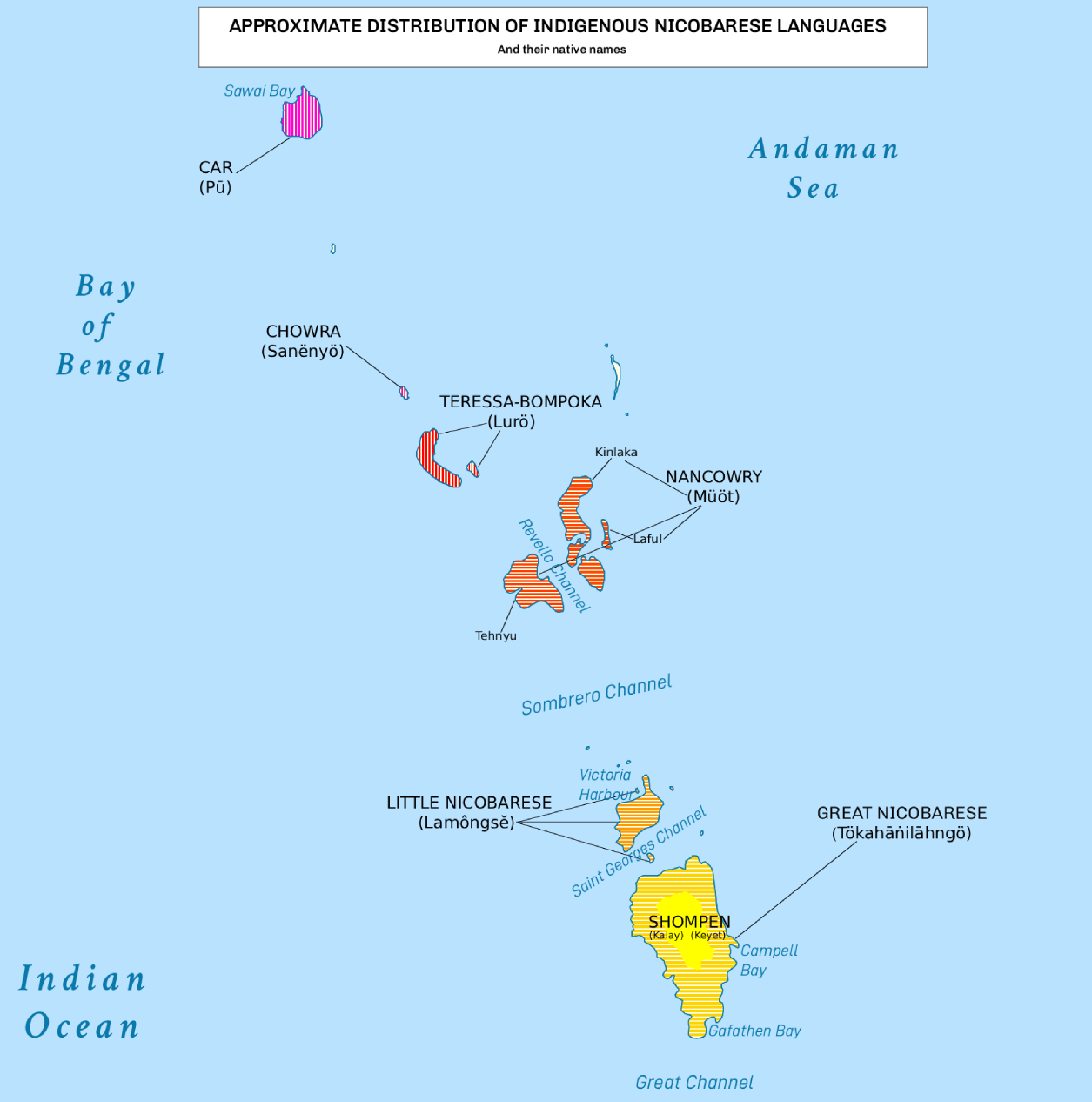
Approximate distribution of the Nicobarese languages

Sidwell (2022), based on a computational phylogenetic lexical analysis, proposes a new classification which treats Car and Shompen as single language branches of North and South Nicobarese while placing other lects into Central Nicobarese.

- Nicobarese
  - Northern
    - Car (Pū)
  - Central
    - Chawra–Teressa
      - Chawra (Sanënyö, Tətɛt)
      - Teressa–Bompoka (Luröö, Təihlɔŋ, Poatat)
    - South–Central
      - Nancowry–Little Nicobar
        - Nancowry (Mūöt), Camorta (Kinlaka), Katchall (Tehnyu), Trinkat (Laful)
        - Little Nicobarese (Lamôngsĕ, Kondul, Pulo Milo)
      - Great Nicobarese (Tökahāṅilāhngö)
  - Southern
    - Shompen (Kalay, Keyet)

== See also ==
- Shompen language
- List of Proto-Nicobarese reconstructions (Wiktionary)
