= Nicobar Islands =

Island group in the Indian Ocean

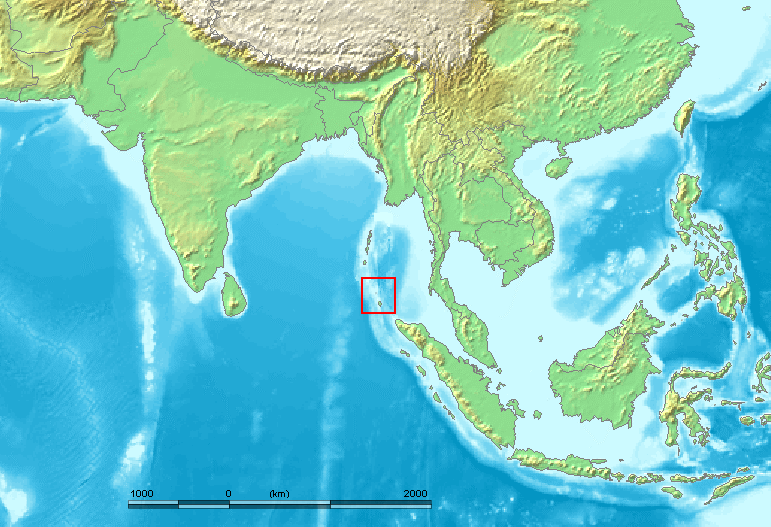
- Location of the Nicobar Islands in the Indian Ocean.

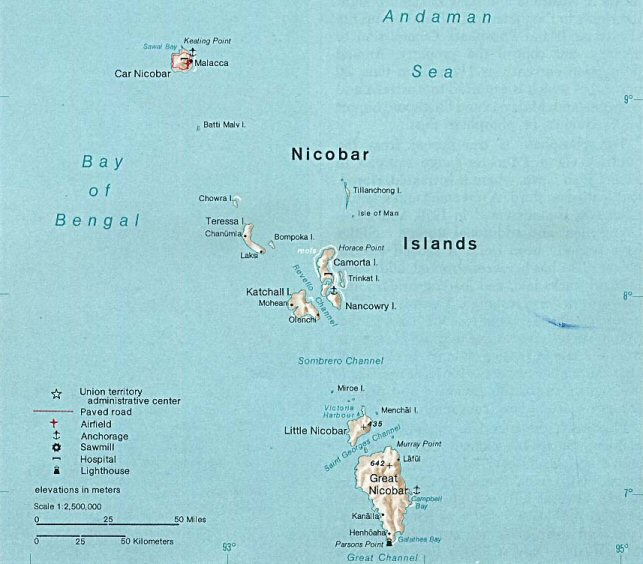

Geography
- Location: Bay of Bengal
- Coordinates: 7°05′N 93°48′E
- Archipelago: Andaman and Nicobar Islands
- Total islands: 22
- Major islands: Car Nicobar, Great Nicobar, Little Nicobar
- Area: 1,841 km^{2} (711 sq mi)
- Highest elevation: 642 m (2106 ft)
- Highest point: Mount Thullier

Administration
- India
- Union territory: Andaman and Nicobar Islands
- Capital city: Port Blair (on South Andaman Island)
- Largest settlement: Malacca, Car Nicobar (pop. 1,637)

Demographics
- Population: 36,842 (2011)
- Pop. density: 20/km^{2} (50/sq mi)
- Ethnic groups: Nicobarese; Shompen; Mainland Indians

Additional information
- Time zone: IST (UTC+5:30)
  - Summer (DST): not observed (UTC+5:30)
- Official website: https://andaman.nic.in/

The Nicobar Islands /ˈnɪkəbɑːr/ are an archipelagic island chain in the eastern Indian Ocean. They are located in Southeast Asia, 150 kilometres (93 mi) northwest of Aceh on Sumatra, and separated from Thailand to the east by the Andaman Sea. Located 1,300 kilometres (810 mi) southeast of the Indian subcontinent, across the Bay of Bengal, they are part of India, as the Nicobar district within the union territory of the Andaman and Nicobar Islands. Together with the Andaman Islands to their north, the Nicobar Islands serve as a maritime boundary between the Bay of Bengal to the west and the Andaman Sea to the east.

In 2013, UNESCO added the Great Nicobar Island to its World Network of Biosphere Reserves, a list of internationally designated protected areas.

== History ==
=== Etymology ===
The earliest extant references to the name "Nicobar" is in the Sri Lankan Pali Buddhist chronicles, the Dipavamsa (c. 3rd or 4th century CE) and the Mahavamsa (c. 4th or 5th century), which state that children of followers of Vijaya, the legendary founder of Tambapanni, landed on Naggadipa ("the island of the children", from Pali nagga meaning 'naked'). In the ninth century, the Persian explorer Abū Zayd al-Sīrāfī referred to the Nicobar Islands as Lanjabālūs. The modern name is likely derived from the Chola name for the islands, Nakkavaram (Tamil: நக்கவரம் "naked man's land" from நக்க nakka "naked"), which is inscribed on the Thanjavur (Tanjore) inscription of 1050 CE. Marco Polo (12th-13th century) also referred to this island as 'Necuverann'.

The Mao Kun map in the Wu Bei Zhi made for the voyages of Zheng He in the 15th century annotated Great Nicobar Island as "Cui Lan island" (翠蘭嶼).

=== Prehistory ===
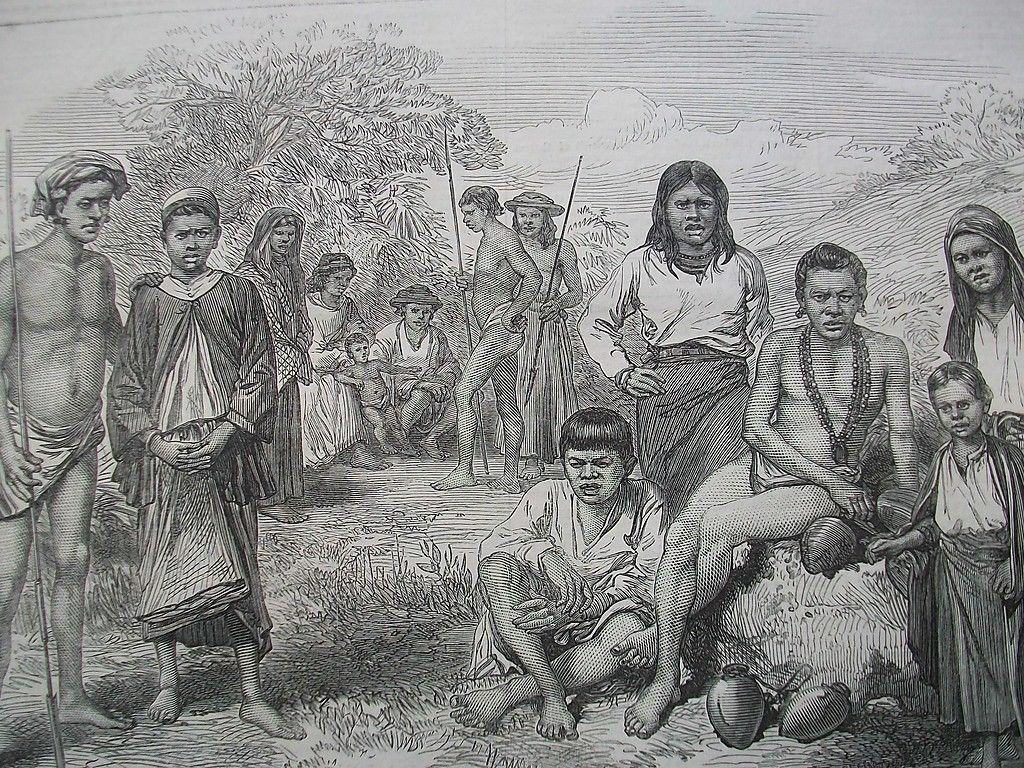
Nicobarese people, c. 1870

The Nicobar Islands are believed to have been inhabited for several thousands of years. Six indigenous Nicobarese languages are spoken on the islands, which are part of the Austroasiatic language family, which include the Mon, Khmer, and Vietnamese languages of Southeast Asia, as well as the Munda languages of India. An indigenous tribe living at the southern tip of Great Nicobar, known as the Shompen, may be of Mesolithic Southeast Asian origin.

=== Colonial period ===
Organized European colonization on the islands began with the Danish East India Company in 1754/56. During this time, they were administered from Tranquebar (in continental Danish India) under the name of Frederiksøerne. Missionaries from the Moravian Church Brethren's settlement in Tranquebar attempted a settlement on Nancowry and died in great numbers from disease. The islands were repeatedly abandoned due to outbreaks of malaria: 1784–1807/09, 1830–1834, and finally from 1848, gradually for good. Between 1778 and 1783, William Bolts attempted to establish an Austrian colony on the islands on the mistaken assumption that Denmark–Norway had abandoned its claims to the islands.

Italy attempted to buy the Nicobar Islands from Denmark between 1864 and 1865. The Italian Minister of Agriculture and Commerce, Luigi Torelli, started a negotiation that looked promising but failed due to the unexpected end of his office and the second La Marmora Cabinet. The negotiations were interrupted and never brought up again.

Denmark's presence in the islands ended formally on 16 October 1868 when it sold the rights to the Nicobar Islands to the United Kingdom, which, in 1869, made them part of British India.

=== Second World War ===
During the Second World War, the islands were invaded and occupied by Japan between 1942 and 1945. In May 1945, HMS Ceylon shelled Japanese positions on the islands. The British regained possession of the islands after the surrender of Japan, announced on 15 August and formally signed on 2 September 1945. After the war, Pakistani politician Choudhry Rahmat Ali proposed that the Nicobars (which he called the "Balus Islands") would have a sizeable Muslim population and thus would be integrated to the Dominion of Pakistan. However, this never materialised.

=== Indian union territory ===
Together with the Andaman Islands, it became part of India in 1950 and was declared as a union territory of the nation in 1956.

=== 26 December 2004 tsunami ===
On 26 December 2004, the coast of the Nicobar Islands was devastated by a 10-to-15-metre-high (33 to 49 ft) tsunami following the 2004 Indian Ocean earthquake. At least 6,000 people were killed on the Andaman and Nicobar Islands with reports putting the death toll on Katchal Island alone at 4,600.

Several islands were heavily damaged with initial reports of islands broken in two or three pieces and coral reefs moved above water. Teressa Island was said to have been split into two pieces and Trinkat Island into three pieces. Some estimates said that the islands were moved as much as 30 metres (100 ft) by the earthquake and tilted.

Indira Point subsided 4.25 metres (13.9 ft) and the lighthouse there was damaged.

== Geography ==
The Nicobar Islands cover a land area of 1,841 square kilometres (711 sq mi) and a population of 36,844 inhabitants, according to the 2011 census of India. They comprise three distinct groups:

Northern Group:

- Car Nicobar (Pū)
- Battimalv (Kuono)

Central Group:

- Chowra, Chaura, or Sanenyo
- Teressa or Luroo
- Bompuka or Poahat
- Katchal (Tihanyu or Tehnu)
- Kamorta
- Trinket (Laful)
- Nancowry (Nancowrie)
- Tillangchong
- Laouk or "Isle of Man"

Southern Group (Sambelong in the Southern Nicobarese language):

- Great Nicobar (Lo'ong) (922 km^{2} or 356 sq mi, largest island of the Nicobars)
- Kondul Island (Lamongshe), located between Great Nicobar and Little Nicobar
- Kabra Island, located between Great Nicobar and Little Nicobar
- Little Nicobar (Ong)
- Pulo Milo or Pillomilo (Milo Island)
- Menchal Island (Pingaeyak)
- Treis (Albatei) Island
- Trak (Mafuya) Island
- Meroe (Piruii)
- Pigeon Island
- Megapod Island

Indira Point (6.756378°N 93.827765°E) is the southernmost point of Great Nicobar Island and also of India itself, lying about 150 kilometres (93 mi) north of Sumatra, Indonesia.

=== Geology ===
The Nicobar Islands are part of a great island arc created by the collision of the Indo-Australian Plate with Eurasia. The collision lifted the Himalayas and most of the Indonesian islands, and created a long arc of highlands and islands, which includes the Arakan Yoma range of Burma, the Andaman and Nicobar islands, and the islands off the west coast of Sumatra, including the Banyak Islands and the Mentawai Islands.

=== Climate ===
The climate is warm and tropical, with temperatures ranging from 22 to 30 °C (72 to 86 °F). Rainfall is heavy due to annual monsoons and measures around 3,000 to 3,800 mm (120 to 150 in) each year.

=== Ecology ===
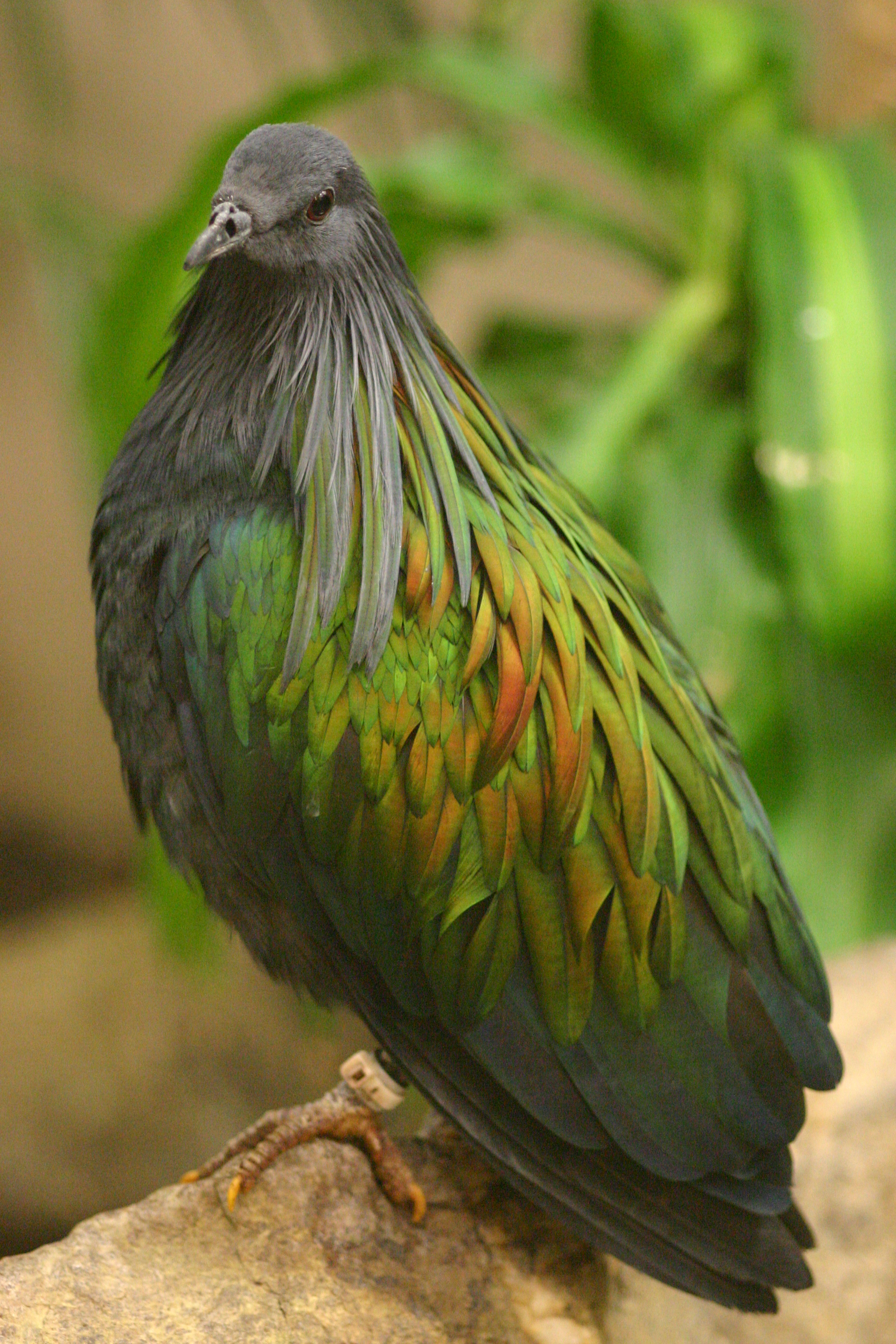
A Nicobar pigeon. While named after the Nicobar Islands, it is also found widely in the Malay Archipelago

The Nicobar Islands are recognized as a distinct terrestrial ecoregion, the Nicobar Islands rainforests, which host many endemic species.

The vegetation of the Nicobars is typically divided into the coastal mangrove forests and the interior evergreen and deciduous tropical and subtropical moist broadleaf forests. Additionally, several islands contain extensive inland grasslands, though these are thought to have resulted from human intervention.

As a result of lower sea levels during the ice ages, the Andaman Islands were linked to the Southeast Asian mainland, but it is not believed that the Nicobar Islands ever had a land bridge to the continent. Lower sea levels linked the islands to one another: Great Nicobar and Little Nicobar were linked to each other, and Nancowry, Chaura, Katchall, Trinka, Camorta, and the nearby smaller islands were linked to one another as well.

==== Protected areas ====
Protected areas include Campbell Bay National Park and Galathea National Park on Great Nicobar.

A World Biosphere Reserve was declared on Grand Nicobar by UNESCO on 31 May 31 2013. The Great Nicobar Biosphere Reserve consists of an area of 103,870 hectares (256,700 acres). The core area, which measures 53,623 hectares (132,510 acres), comprises Campbell Bay and Galathea National Parks. A buffer area of 34,877 hectares (86,180 acres) includes lands adjacent to and between the two parks. There is also a transitional area of 10,070 hectares (24,900 acres), including 5,300 marine hectares (13,000 acres).

== Population ==
Historical population
Year	Pop.	±% p.a.
1901	6,511	—
1911	8,818	+3.08%
1921	9,272	+0.50%
1931	10,240	+1.00%
1941	12,452	+1.98%
1951	12,009	−0.36%
1961	14,563	+1.95%
1971	21,665	+4.05%
1981	30,454	+3.46%
1991	39,208	+2.56%
2001	42,068	+0.71%
2011	36,842	−1.32%

The islands had a population of 36,842 in 2011. The indigenous ethnic groups are the Nicobarese and the Shompen. Local languages include Shompen and the languages of the tin Nicobarese group.

== Transportation ==
- Airport: Car Nicobar has an airstrip on Car Nicobar Air Force Base of 2,717 by 43 metres (8,914 by 141 ft) on the South East coast near Malacca but does not offer commercial service. Great Nicobar has a small airstrip of approximately 1,000 metres (3,300 ft) at Campbell Bay/Tenlaa on its East Coast.
- Seaport: At least one small shipping dock is located in Campbell Bay on the East coast of Great Nicobar. Car Nicobar has a small dock at its Northern tip near Keating Point and Mus.

== See also ==
- Nicobarese people
- Nicobarese languages
- Shompen people
- Austrian colonization of the Nicobar Islands
- 1881 Nicobar Islands earthquake
- Great Nicobar Biosphere Reserve
- Great Nicobar
- Malaysia Airlines Flight MH370
- Indian Ocean
