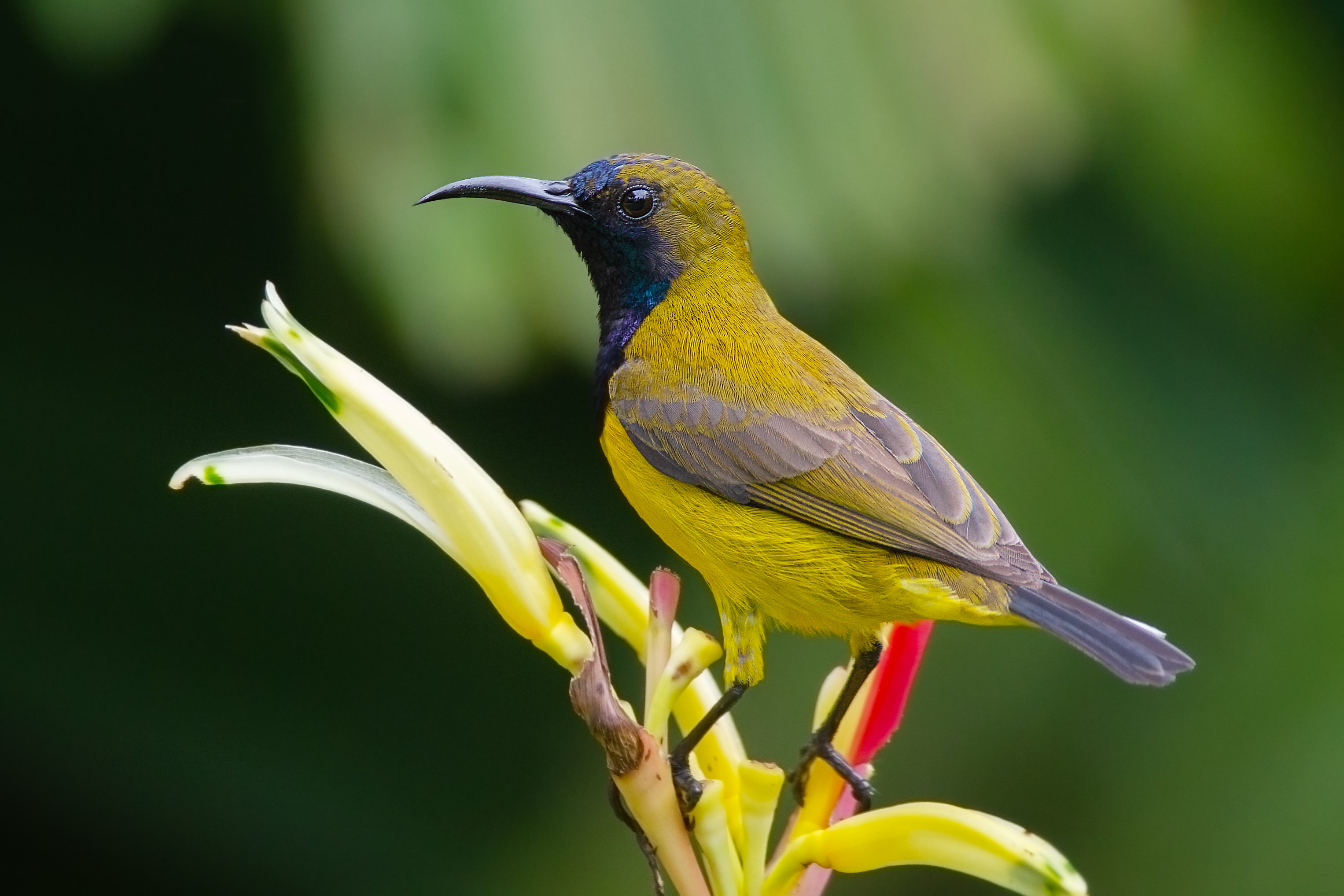
- Male
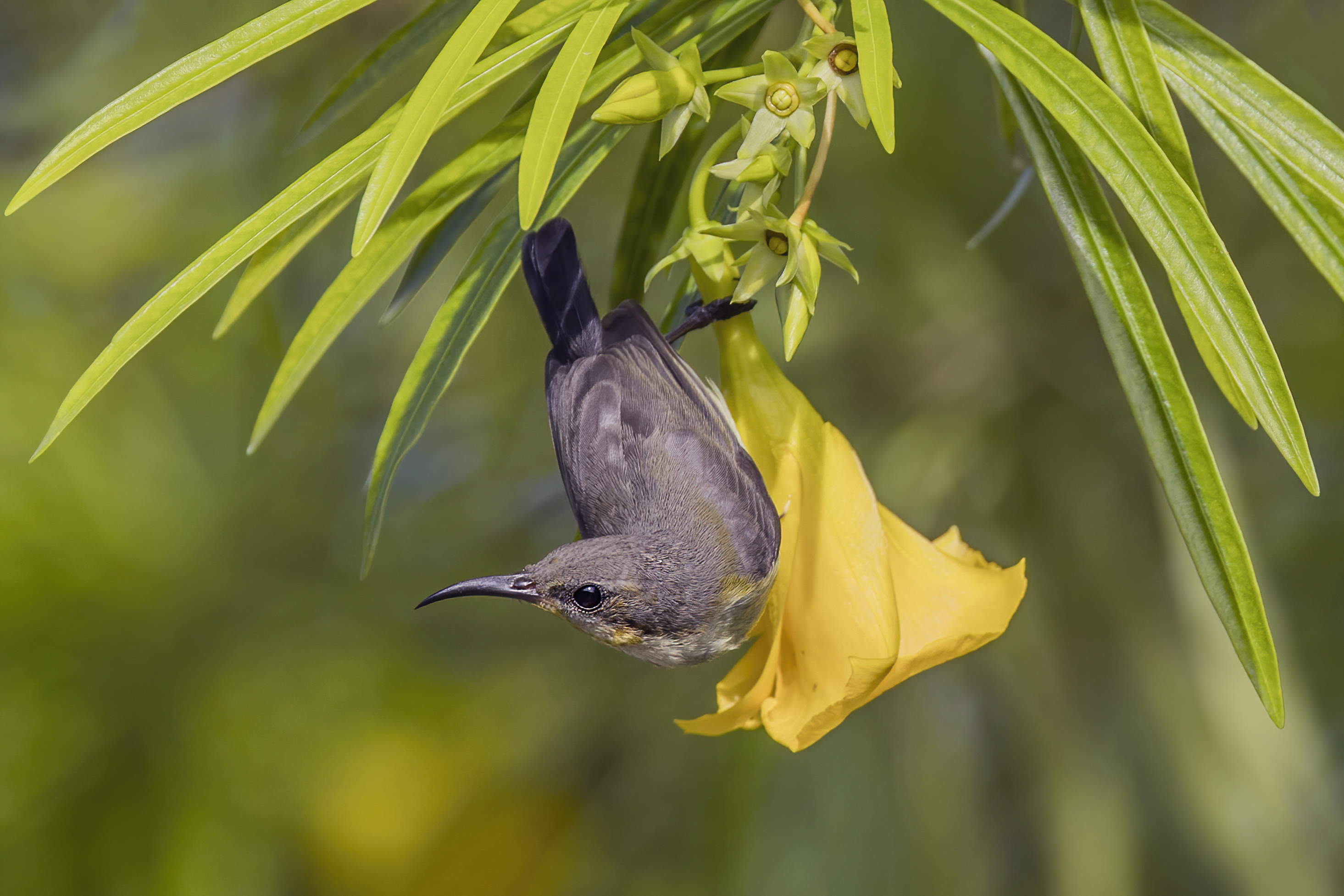
- Female, Thailand

Scientific classification
- Kingdom: Animalia
- Phylum: Chordata
- Class: Aves
- Order: Passeriformes
- Family: Nectariniidae
- Genus: Cinnyris
- Species: C. ornatus

Binomial name
- Cinnyris ornatus Lesson, 1827

= Ornate sunbird =

Species of bird

The ornate sunbird (Cinnyris ornatus) is a species of bird in the sunbird family Nectariniidae that is endemic to Mainland Southeast Asia, Sumatra, Java, Borneo and the Lesser Sunda Islands. It was formerly considered to be a subspecies of the olive-backed sunbird, now renamed the garden sunbird (Cinnyris jugularis).

== Taxonomy ==
The ornate sunbird was formally described in 1827 by the French naturalist René Lesson under the binomial name Cinnyris ornatus. He based his description on a hand-coloured plate showing the male and female birds that had been published in 1822 as part of a book by the Dutch zoologist Coenraad Jacob Temminck. Temminck's specimens had been collected in Java. The specific epithet is Latin meaning "ornate" or "adorned". The ornate sunbird forms part of the olive-backed sunbird (Cinnyris jugularis) species complex. A comparison of mitochondrial DNA sequences has revealed deep genetic divergence from the other groups sampled. With the split of the complex the olive-backed sunbird has been renamed to the garden sunbird.

Eight subspecies are recognised:

- C. o. andamanicus (Hume, 1873) – Andaman Islands
- C. o. klossi (Richmond, 1902) – Nicobar Islands (except Car Nicobar and Kondul Island)
- C. o. proselius Oberholser, 1923 – Car Nicobar (north Nicobar Islands)
- C. o. blanfordi Baker, ECS, 1921 – Kondul (south Nicobar Islands)
- C. o. flammaxillaris (Blyth, 1845) – Myanmar, Thailand, central, south Indochina and north Malay Peninsula
- C. o. ornatus Lesson, RP, 1827 – central, south Malay Peninsula, Sumatra, Borneo, Java, Bali and Lesser Sunda Islands (except Sumba and Timor)
- C. o. polyclystus Oberholser, 1912 – Enggano Island (west of south Sumatra)
- C. o. rhizophorae (Swinhoe, 1869) – south, southeast China including Hainan, and north Vietnam

== Description ==
The ornate sunbird is 10–11.4 cm (3.9–4.5 in) in length. The male weighs 6.7–11.9 g (0.24–0.42 oz), the female 6–10 g (0.21–0.35 oz). The species is sexually dimorphic. The male of the nominate subspecies is olive above, the remiges are black with green edging and the black tail has a white tip. The throat, side of neck, throat and breast are blue-black iridescent. The underparts are yellow. The iris is dark brown, the bill and legs are black. The female lacks the iridescent throat, is greenish-olive above, and has a yellow supercilium. For the male Cinnyris ornatus ornatus subspecies, it differs from the male garden sunbird in having some purple-black gloss on forehead and having paler yellow plumage below.

== Distribution and habitat ==
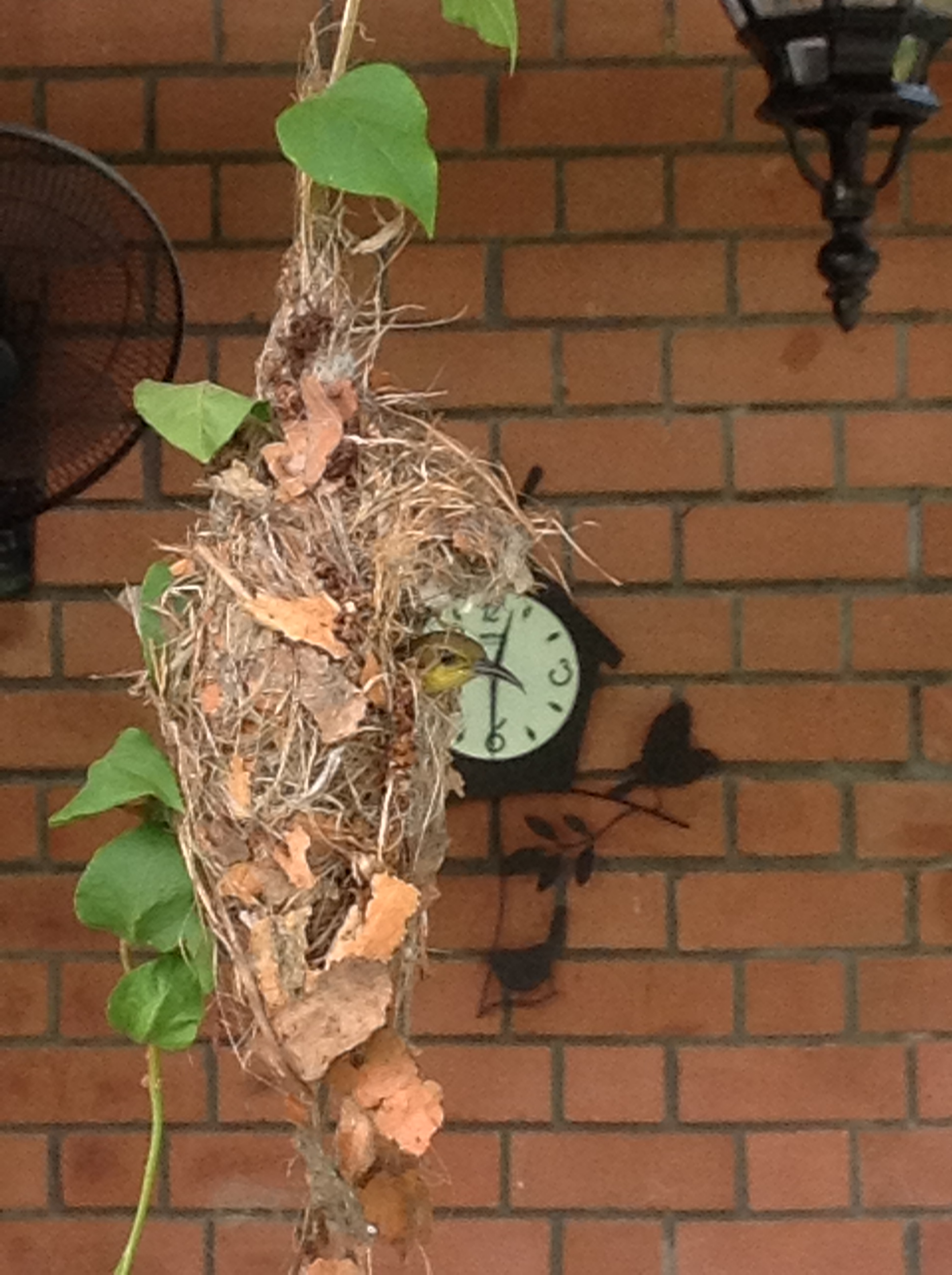
Nest with female

The ornate sunbird is resident in Myanmar, southern China, Thailand, Cambodia, Vietnam, Malaysia, and Indonesia. It is found in various habitats including mangroves, forest edge, open scrub as well as parks and gardens.

== Behaviour and ecology ==
=== Breeding ===
The elongated hanging nest is 30–60 cm (12–24 in) in length and has a hooded side entrance. It is usually placed between 0.5 and 1.5 m (1 ft 8 in and 4 ft 11 in) above the ground but can occasionally be as high as 10 m (33 ft). It is constructed by the female using grass, bark, moss, lichens, leaf fragments, vegetable fibres and spider webs. The clutch of 1–3 eggs is incubated by the female. The eggs hatch after 11–16 days and the young are then fed by both parents. The chicks fledge after 13–16 days. Normally several broods are raised each year.

=== Feeding ===
It forages either singly or in small groups. The diet mainly consists of small insects, spiders, nectar and small fruit.
