= Kakana =

Kakana may refer to:

- Kakana, Car Nicobar, a village in Andaman & Nicobar Islands, India
- Kakana, Nancowry, a village in Andaman & Nicobar Islands, India
- Cacán, a language spoken in Argentina and also called Kakana
