= Lopate =

Lopate may refer to:

== People ==
- Leonard Lopate (1940–2025), American, radio talk show host
- Phillip Lopate (born 1943), American writer

== Places ==
- Big Lapati, also known as "Big Lopate", a village in India
- Lopate, Montenegro, a village near Podgorica, Montenegro
- Lopate, Kumanovo, North Macedonia

== Other uses ==
- Battle of Lopate (1796), between Old Montenegro and the Ottoman Empire
