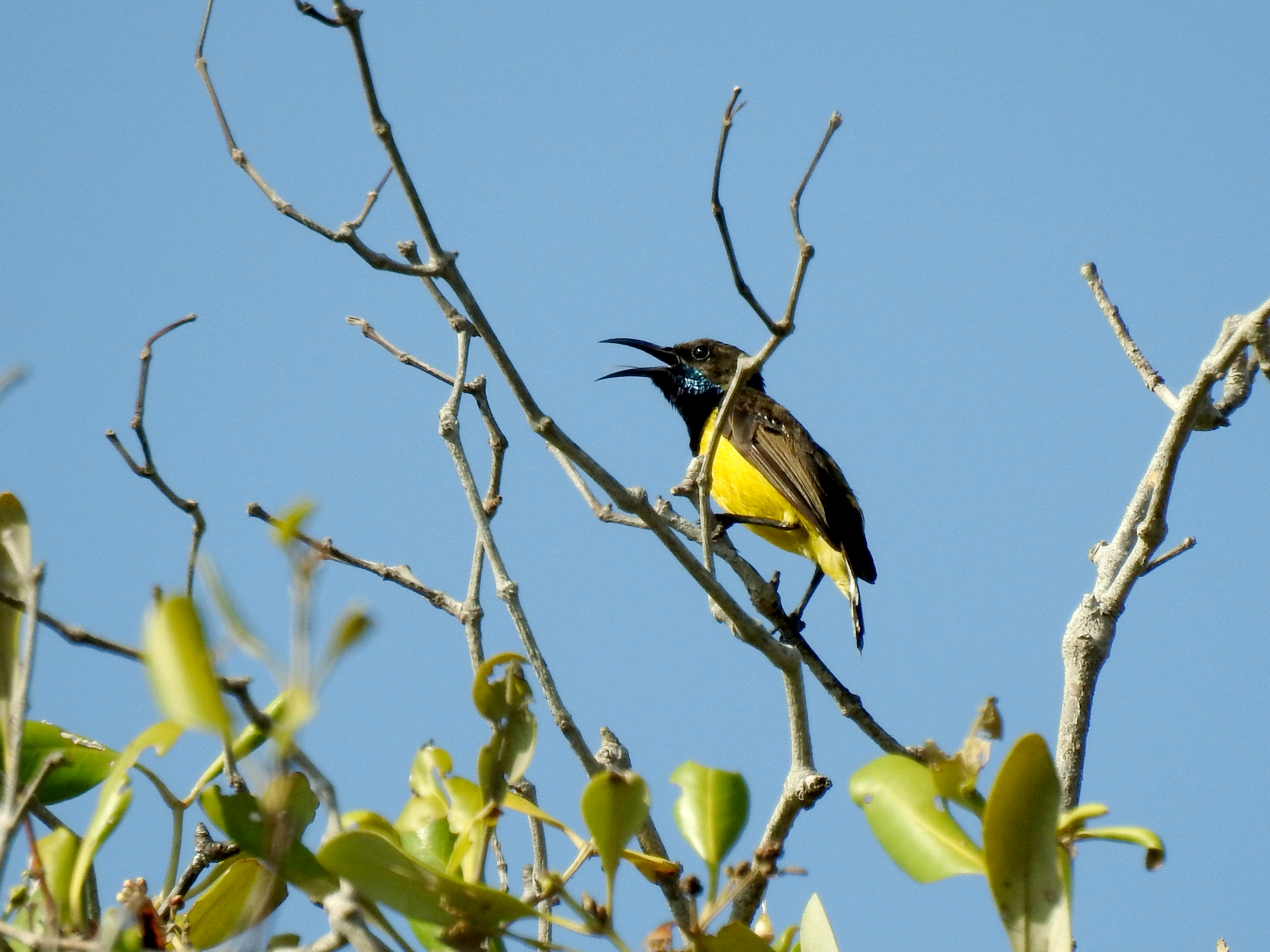
- Male, from Kaledupa Island, Wakatobi, South-east Sulawesi, Indonesia
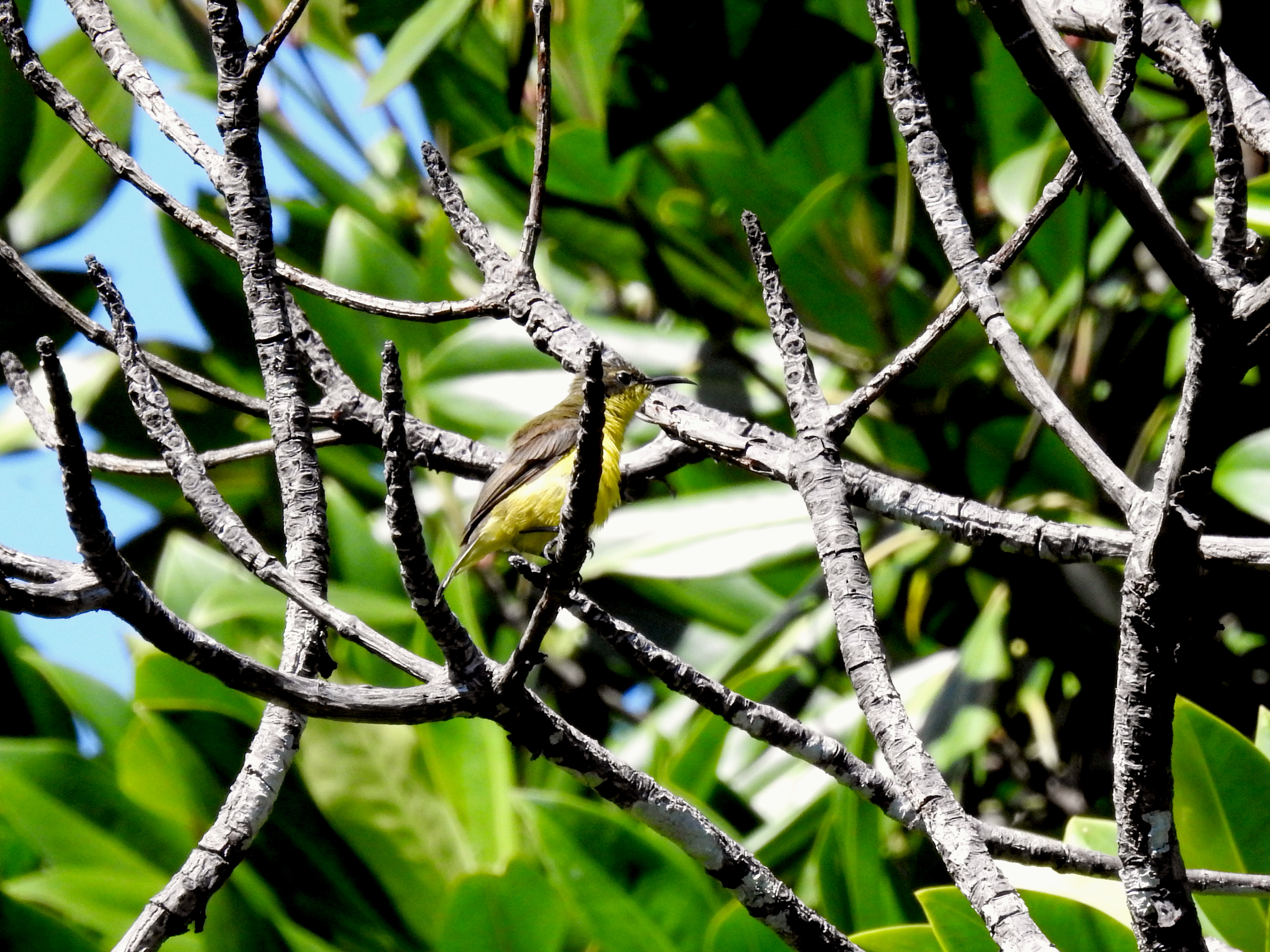
- Female, from Kaledupa Island also

Scientific classification
- Kingdom: Animalia
- Phylum: Chordata
- Class: Aves
- Order: Passeriformes
- Family: Nectariniidae
- Genus: Cinnyris
- Species: C. infrenatus

Binomial name
- Cinnyris infrenatus Hartert, 1903

Synonyms
- Cinnyris clementiae infrenatus Hartert, 1903; Cinnyris jugularis infrenatus Hartert, 1903

= Tukangbesi sunbird =

Species of bird

The Tukangbesi sunbird (Cinnyris infrenatus) is a species of passerine bird in the sunbird family Nectariniidae that is found on the Tukangbesi Islands that lie to the southeast of Sulawesi in Indonesia. It was formerly considered to be a subspecies of the olive-backed sunbird, now renamed the garden sunbird (Cinnyris jugularis).

== Taxonomy ==
The Tukangbesi sunbird was formally described in 1903 by the German ornithologist Ernst Hartert based on specimens collected by Heinrich Kühn on the Tukangbesi Islands (also known as the Wakatobi Islands) which lie southeast of Sulawesi in Indonesia. Hartert coined the binomial name Cinnyris infrenatus. The specific epithet is Latin meaning "unbridled". It was formerly considered as a subspecies of the olive-backed sunbird (renamed as the garden sunbird) (Cinnyris jugularis) but is now treated as a separate species based on the genetic and plumage differences. The species is monotypic: no subspecies are recognised.

== Description ==
The Tukangbesi sunbird is 10–11.4 cm (3.9–4.5 in) in length. The male weighs 6.7–11.9 g (0.24–0.42 oz), the female 6–10 g (0.21–0.35 oz). The species is sexual dimorphic. The male is dark brownish-olive above, the remiges are black with light edging and the outer feathers of the black tail have a white tip. The throat is blue-black iridescent, the iris is dark brown and the legs are black. The underparts are yellow. This species lacks the yellow supercilium and yellow moustachial stripe of the Sahul sunbird. The female lacks the iridescent throat patch.

== Behaviour ==
=== Breeding ===
The elongated hanging nest is 30–60 cm (12–24 in) in length and has a hooded side entrance. It is usually placed between 0.5 and 1.5 m (1 ft 8 in and 4 ft 11 in) above the ground but can occasionally be as high as 10 m (33 ft). It is constructed by the female using grass, bark, moss, lichens, leaf fragments, vegetable fibres and spider webs. The clutch of 1–3 eggs is incubated by the female. The eggs hatch after 11–16 days and the young are then fed by both parents. The chicks fledge after 13–16 days. Normally several broods are raised each year.

=== Food and feeding ===
It forages either singly or in small groups. The diet consists of small insects, spiders, nectar and small fruit.
