= IAF Camp =

- village
- Location in Andaman and Nicobar Islands, India IAF Camp (India)
- Coordinates: 9.153547°N 92.824377°E
- Country: India
- State: Andaman and Nicobar Islands
- District: Nicobar
- Tehsil: Car Nicobar

Population (2011)
  - Total: 731
- Time zone: UTC+5:30 (IST)
- Census code: 645018

IAF Camp (short for Indian Air Force Camp) is a village in the Nicobar district of Andaman and Nicobar Islands, India. It is located in the Car Nicobar tehsil. The Car Nicobar Air Force Base is located here.

== Demographics ==
According to the 2011 census of India, IAF Camp has 31 households. The effective literacy rate (i.e. the literacy rate of population excluding children aged 6 and below) is 100%.

Demographics (2011 census)
	Total	Male	Female
Population	731	723	8
Children aged below 6 years	2	0	2
Scheduled caste	0	0	0
Scheduled tribe	0	0	0
Literates	729	723	6
Workers (all)	724	723	1
Main workers (total)	718	717	1
Main workers: Cultivators	19	19	0
Main workers: Agricultural labourers	0	0	0
Main workers: Household industry workers	0	0	0
Main workers: Other	699	698	1
Marginal workers (total)	6	6	0
Marginal workers: Cultivators	2	2	0
Marginal workers: Agricultural labourers	0	0	0
Marginal workers: Household industry workers	0	0	0
Marginal workers: Others	4	4	0
Non-workers	7	0	7
