= Small Lapati =

Small Lapati Tö-kuö-nö Sē-ti Small Lapathy / Lopate
- village
- Location in Andaman and Nicobar Islands, India Small Lapati (India)
- Coordinates: 9.214267°N 92.786713°E
- Country: India
- State: Andaman and Nicobar Islands
- District: Nicobar
- Tehsil: Car Nicobar

Population (2011)
  - Total: 938
- Time zone: UTC+5:30 (IST)
- Census code: 645026

Small Lapati is a village in the Nicobar district of Andaman and Nicobar Islands, India. It is located in the Car Nicobar tehsil, near Big Lapati.

== Demographics ==
According to the 2011 census of India, Small Lapati has 242 households. The effective literacy rate (i.e. the literacy rate of population excluding children aged 6 and below) is 83.12%.

Demographics (2011 Census)
	Total	Male	Female
Population	938	501	437
Children aged below 6 years	97	51	46
Scheduled caste	0	0	0
Scheduled tribe	920	484	436
Literates	699	397	302
Workers (all)	381	209	172
Main workers (total)	79	56	23
Main workers: Cultivators	0	0	0
Main workers: Agricultural labourers	3	2	1
Main workers: Household industry workers	0	0	0
Main workers: Other	76	54	22
Marginal workers (total)	302	153	149
Marginal workers: Cultivators	2	0	2
Marginal workers: Agricultural labourers	12	10	2
Marginal workers: Household industry workers	4	2	2
Marginal workers: Others	284	141	143
Non-workers	557	292	265
