= Teetop =

Teetop Rit-töp Tee Top
- village
- Location in Andaman and Nicobar Islands, India Teetop (India)
- Coordinates: 9.209099°N 92.737860°E
- Country: India
- State: Andaman and Nicobar Islands
- District: Nicobar
- Tehsil: Car Nicobar

Population (2011)
  - Total: 522
- Time zone: UTC+5:30 (IST)
- Census code: 645013

Teetop is a village in the Nicobar district of Andaman and Nicobar Islands, India. It is located in the Car Nicobar tehsil.

== Demographics ==
According to the 2011 census of India, Teetop has 135 households. The effective literacy rate (i.e. the literacy rate of population excluding children aged 6 and below) is 90.83%.

Demographics (2011 Census)
	Total	Male	Female
Population	522	264	258
Children aged below 6 years	64	32	32
Scheduled caste	0	0	0
Scheduled tribe	518	262	256
Literates	416	223	193
Workers (all)	354	175	179
Main workers (total)	296	147	149
Main workers: Cultivators	1	0	1
Main workers: Agricultural labourers	0	0	0
Main workers: Household industry workers	235	103	132
Main workers: Other	60	44	16
Marginal workers (total)	58	28	30
Marginal workers: Cultivators	0	0	0
Marginal workers: Agricultural labourers	0	0	0
Marginal workers: Household industry workers	53	26	27
Marginal workers: Others	5	2	3
Non-workers	168	89	79
