= Kinmai =

Kinmai Töt-chak
- village
- Location in Andaman and Nicobar Islands, India Kinmai (India)
- Coordinates: 9.212168°N 92.779207°E
- Country: India
- State: Andaman and Nicobar Islands
- District: Nicobar
- Tehsil: Car Nicobar

Population (2011)
  - Total: 574
- Time zone: UTC+5:30 (IST)
- Census code: 645027

Kinmai is a village in the Nicobar district of Andaman and Nicobar Islands, India. It is located in the Car Nicobar tehsil.

== Demographics ==
According to the 2011 census of India, Kinmai has 152 households. The effective literacy rate (i.e. the literacy rate of population excluding children aged 6 and below) is 73.29%.

Demographics (2011 Census)
	Total	Male	Female
Population	574	311	263
Children aged below 6 years	61	30	31
Scheduled caste	0	0	0
Scheduled tribe	541	283	258
Literates	376	221	155
Workers (all)	367	209	158
Main workers (total)	52	44	8
Main workers: Cultivators	0	0	0
Main workers: Agricultural labourers	0	0	0
Main workers: Household industry workers	0	0	0
Main workers: Other	52	44	8
Marginal workers (total)	315	165	150
Marginal workers: Cultivators	1	1	0
Marginal workers: Agricultural labourers	0	0	0
Marginal workers: Household industry workers	308	161	147
Marginal workers: Others	6	3	3
Non-workers	207	102	105
