= Car Nicobar Air Force Station =

Airport in India

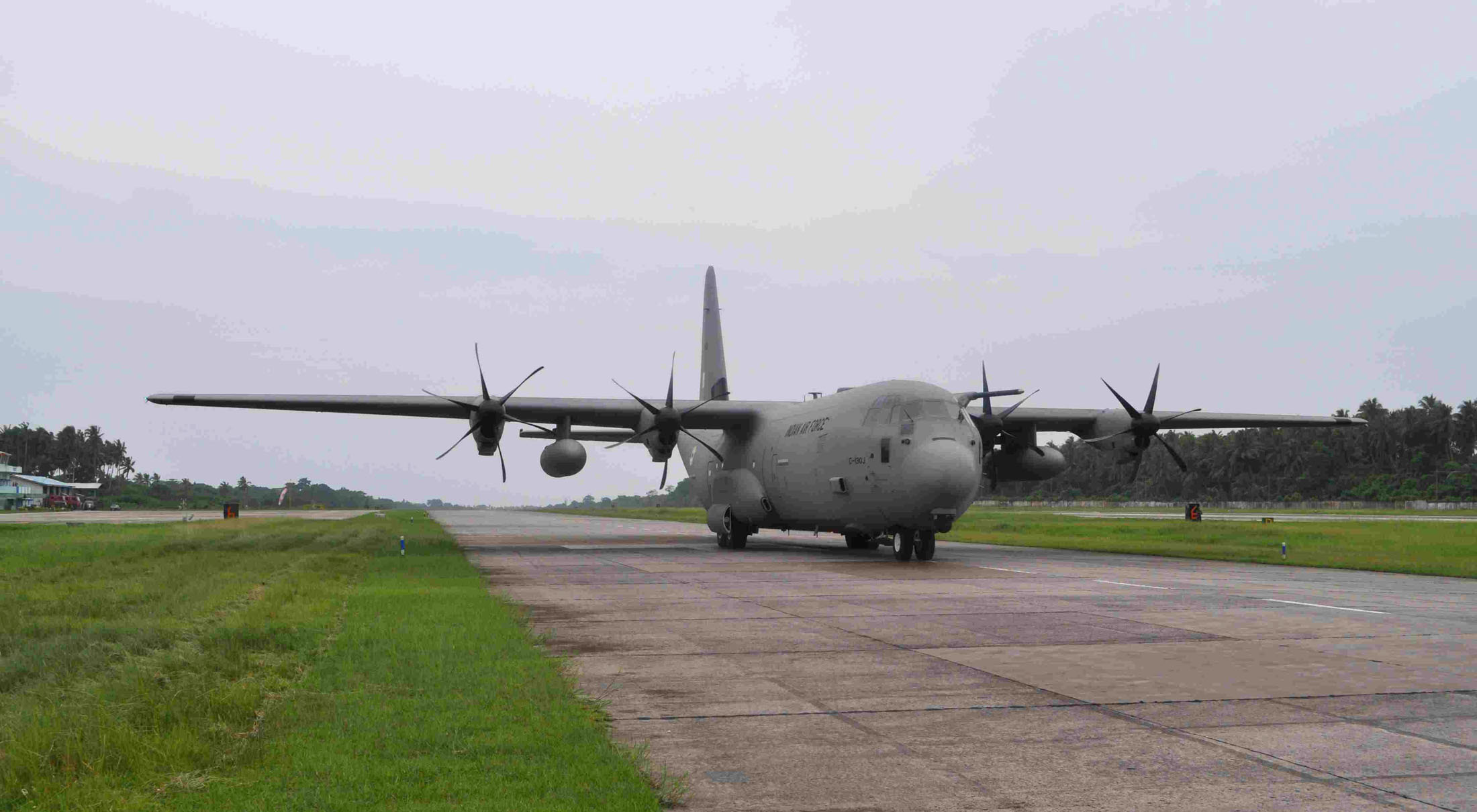
- IATA: CBD; ICAO: VOCX

Summary
- Airport type: Military
- Operator: Indian Air Force
- Location: Car Nicobar, India
- Elevation AMSL: 2 m / 5 ft
- Coordinates: 09°09′09″N 092°49′11″E

Map
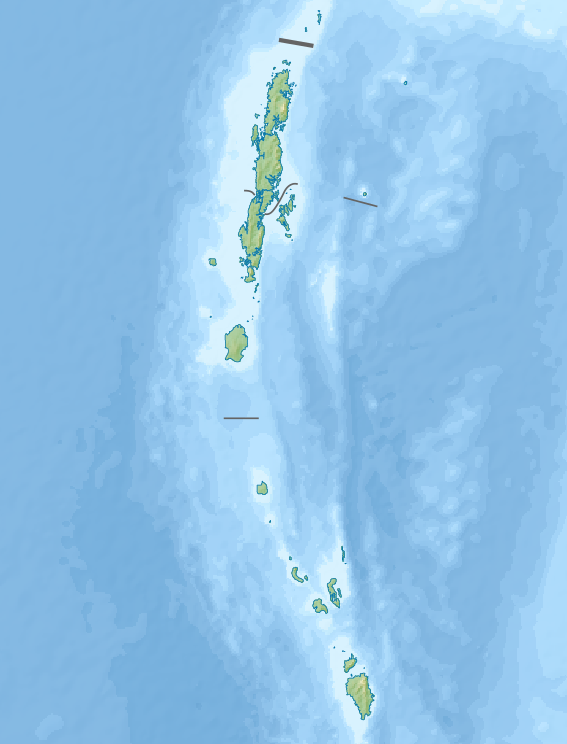
- Location of airport in India CBD (India)

Runways
Direction	Length		Surface
Direction	m	ft	Surface
02/20	2,717	8,914	Concrete

Car Nicobar Air Force Station (IATA: CBD, ICAO: VOCX) is located in IAF Camp village, on Car Nicobar Island in the union territory of the Andaman and Nicobar Islands, India.

== History ==
The 37 Wing Air Force Station at Car Nicobar has an area of 204 hectares (504 acres). The 914-metre (3,000 ft) bitumen runway was built by the Japanese during their occupation of these islands between 1942 and 1945. After 1945, it was used by the British Royal Air Force as a refuelling base for regular (generally twice-weekly) flights between RAF Negombo (now Colombo International Airport) in Sri Lanka (then Ceylon) and RAF Changi in Singapore (& vice versa), with an additional stop in RAF Butterworth, on the Malayan peninsula (opposite Penang). These flights were generally operated by Vickers Valetta twin-prop aircraft. The runway was extended to 2,708 metres (8,886 ft) by the Indian Air Force (IAF) in 1967. The first Mi-8 helicopter arrived here in 1982. Besides the No. 122 Helicopter Flight, IAF of Mi-8 helicopters, Dorniers and an Air Defence unit are based here.

The airstrip was brought into operation by the IAF by raising a staging post in the year 1956, with its role as a refuelling station for all aircraft flying across the Bay of Bengal. The Helicopter Flight was later inducted on 1 April 1985. The Base was upgraded to Forward Base Support Units (FBSU) on 23 August 1986 and subsequently as a Wing on 15 September 1993.

The air station was devastated by the 2004 Indian Ocean earthquake and tsunami, when 116 IAF officers and men, and wives and children, died. Little remained of the air base, which was established as India's southernmost defence post. IAF personnel worked night and day: the runway was repaired, navigational aids and the basic infrastructure were put back in place. On 14 April, just three-and-a-half months later, the Car Nicobar Air Station resumed operations.

== Structure ==
The airport resides at an elevation of 2 metres (5 ft) above mean sea level. It has one runway designated 02/20 with a concrete surface measuring 2,717 by 43 metres (8,914 ft × 141 ft).

== Commercial services ==
The Andaman and Nicobar Islands Administration operates biweekly flights every Monday and Friday between Port Blair and Campbell Bay via Car Nicobar with 10 seater D228 aircraft chartered from the Indian Air Force. There is also a regular helicopter service by Pawan Hans between Car Nicobar, Port Blair and the various islands of Nicobar district.
