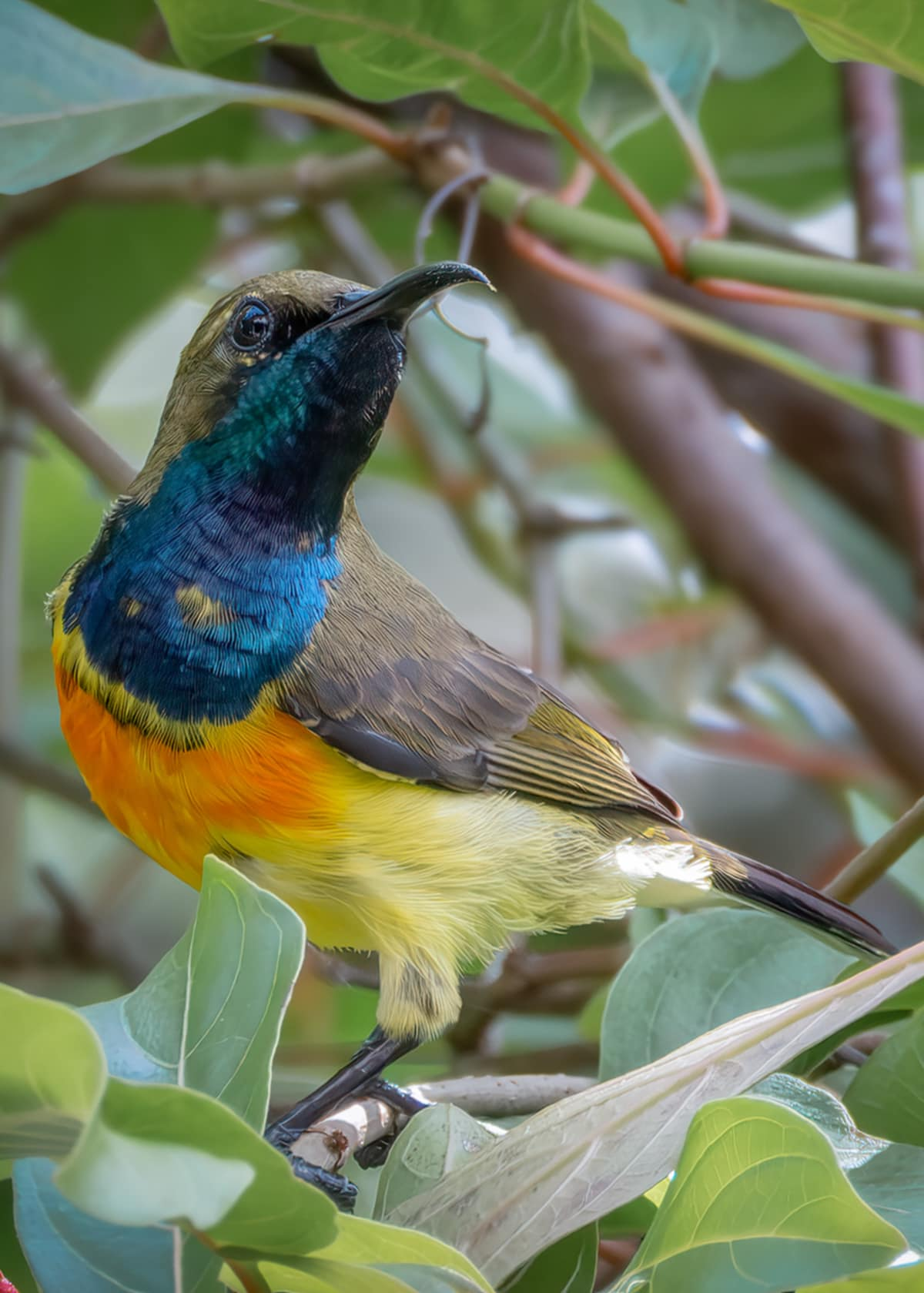
- Male

Scientific classification
- Kingdom: Animalia
- Phylum: Chordata
- Class: Aves
- Order: Passeriformes
- Family: Nectariniidae
- Genus: Cinnyris
- Species: C. aurora

Binomial name
- Cinnyris aurora (Tweeddale, 1878)

= Palawan sunbird =

Species of bird

The Palawan sunbird (Cinnyris aurora) is a species of bird in the sunbird family Nectariniidae that is found on the islands of the Palawan group in the Philippines. It was formerly considered to be a subspecies of the olive-backed sunbird, now renamed the garden sunbird (Cinnyris jugularis).

== Taxonomy ==
The Palawan sunbird was formally described in 1878 by the Scottish ornithologist, the Marquess of Tweeddale based on a specimen collected in Puerto Princesa on the island of Palawan in the Philippines. He coined the binomial name Cyrtostomus aurora. The specific epithet is Latin meaning "dawn" or "east". The Palawan sunbird is now placed in the genus Cinnyris that was introduced in 1816 by the French naturalist Georges Cuvier. It was formerly considered as a subspecies of the olive-backed sunbird (renamed the garden sunbird) (Cinnyris jugularis) but is now treated as a separate species based on the colour of the breast plumage. The species is monotypic: no subspecies are recognised.

== Description ==
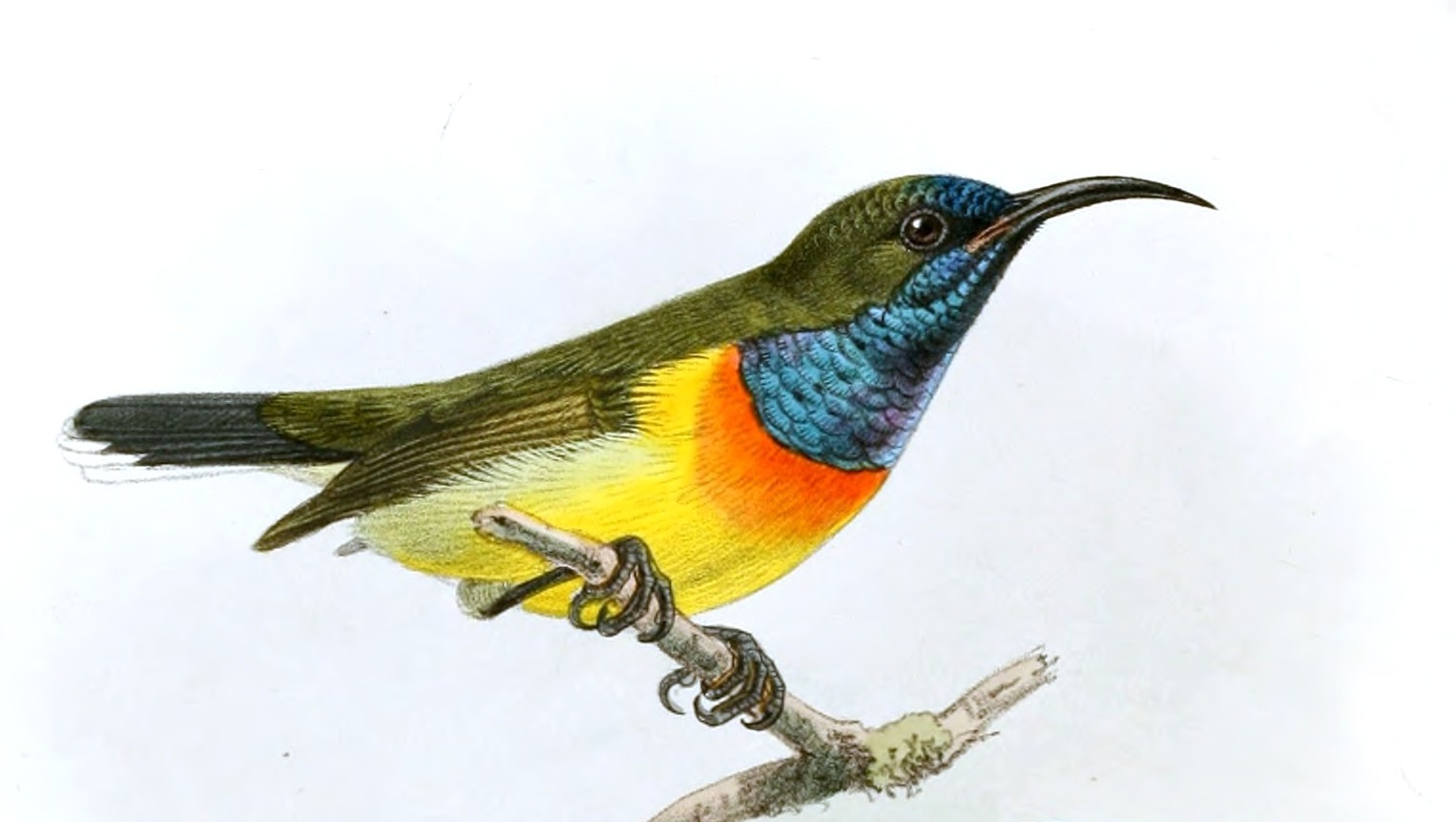
An illustration of a male Palawan Sunbird by Keulemans

The Palawan sunbird is 10–11.4 cm (3.9–4.5 in) in length. The male weighs 6.7–11.9 g (0.24–0.42 oz), the female 6–10 g (0.21–0.35 oz). The species is sexual dimorphic. The male is olive above, the remiges are black with green edging and the black tail has a white tip. The throat, side of neck, throat and breast are blue-black iridescent. The breast has a broad bright orange band. The rest of the underparts are yellow. The iris is dark brown, the bill and legs are black. The female lacks the iridescent throat. It is greenish-olive above and has a yellow supercilium.

== Distribution and habitat ==
The Palawan sunbird is found on the islands of the Palawan group in the Philippines. It occupies various habitats including the forest edge and open scrub.

== Behaviour and ecology ==
=== Breeding ===
The elongated hanging nest is 30–60 cm (12–24 in) in length and has a hooded side entrance. It is usually placed between 0.5 and 1.5 m (1 ft 8 in and 4 ft 11 in) above the ground but can occasionally be as high as 10 m (33 ft). It is constructed by the female using grass, bark, moss, lichens, leaf fragments, vegetable fibres and spider webs. The clutch of 1–3 eggs is incubated by the female. The eggs hatch after 11–16 days and the young are then fed by both parents. The chicks fledge after 13–16 days. Normally several broods are raised each year.

=== Feeding ===
It forages either singly or in small groups. The diet consists of small insects, spiders, nectar and small fruits.
