= Mus, Car Nicobar =

Mus Ha-nyôch
- village
- Location in Andaman and Nicobar Islands, India Mus (India)
- Coordinates: 9.241261°N 92.780614°E
- Country: India
- State: Andaman and Nicobar Islands
- District: Nicobar
- Tehsil: Car Nicobar

Population (2011)
  - Total: 1,553
- Time zone: UTC+5:30 (IST)
- Census code: 645012

Mus is a village in the Nicobar district of Andaman and Nicobar Islands, India. It is located in the Car Nicobar tehsil.

== Demographics ==
According to the 2011 census of India, Mus has 365 households. The effective literacy rate (i.e. the literacy rate of population excluding children aged 6 and below) is 80.2%.

Demographics (2011 Census)
| | Total | Male | Female |
|---|---|---|---|
| Population | 1553 | 787 | 766 |
| Children aged below 6 years | 164 | 70 | 94 |
| Scheduled caste | 0 | 0 | 0 |
| Scheduled tribe | 1481 | 725 | 756 |
| Literates | 1114 | 619 | 495 |
| Workers (all) | 812 | 497 | 315 |
| Main workers (total) | 187 | 148 | 39 |
| Main workers: Cultivators | 2 | 0 | 2 |
| Main workers: Agricultural labourers | 0 | 0 | 0 |
| Main workers: Household industry workers | 2 | 2 | 0 |
| Main workers: Other | 183 | 146 | 37 |
| Marginal workers (total) | 625 | 349 | 276 |
| Marginal workers: Cultivators | 3 | 0 | 3 |
| Marginal workers: Agricultural labourers | 1 | 1 | 0 |
| Marginal workers: Household industry workers | 53 | 47 | 6 |
| Marginal workers: Others | 568 | 301 | 267 |
| Non-workers | 741 | 290 | 451 |
