= No. 122 Helicopter Flight, IAF =

No. 122 Helicopter Flight
- Active: 26 September 1981 - present
- Country: Republic of India
- Branch: Indian Air Force
- Garrison/HQ: Car Nicobar AFS
- Nickname: "Dolphins"
- Mottos: Apatsu Mitram; A friend in time of need

Aircraft flown
- Attack: Mil Mi-8

No. 122 Helicopter Flight (Dolphins) is a HELICOPTER squadron and is equipped with Mil Mi-17 V5 and based at Car Nicobar AFS.

== History ==
=== Aircraft ===
- Mi-8/8T TILL 2012
- Mi-17V5
