= Mamberamo sunbird =

Conservation status
- Least Concern (IUCN 3.1)

Scientific classification
- Kingdom: Animalia
- Phylum: Chordata
- Class: Aves
- Order: Passeriformes
- Family: Nectariniidae
- Genus: Cinnyris
- Species: C. idenburgi

Binomial name
- Cinnyris idenburgi Rand, 1940

Species of bird

The Mamberamo sunbird or Rand's sunbird, (Cinnyris idenburgi) is a species of bird in the sunbird family Nectariniidae that is found in northern New Guinea. It was formerly considered to be a subspecies of the olive-backed sunbird, now renamed the garden sunbird (Cinnyris jugularis).

== Taxonomy ==
The Mamberamo sunbird was formally described in 1940 by the Canadian zoologist Austin L. Rand based on specimens that had been collected near the Idenburg River (now the Taritatu River), a tributary of the Mamberamo River in northern New Guinea. Rand considered it to be a subspecies of the olive-backed sunbird, now renamed the garden sunbird, and coined the trinomial name Cinnyris jugularis idenburgi. The Mamberamo sunbird is now treated as a separate species based on the difference in the colouring of the male plumage. The species is monotypic: no subspecies are recognised.

== Description ==
The Mamberamo sunbird is 10–11.4 cm (3.9–4.5 in) in length. The male weighs 6.7–11.9 g (0.24–0.42 oz), the female 6–10 g (0.21–0.35 oz). The species is sexual dimorphic. The male is dark olive-green above with black remiges and a black tail with the outer feathers tipped with grey. The pectoral_tufts are orange. The underparts are black with a blue-green gloss. The iris is dark brown and the legs are black. The female is pale brown above, yellow below with a whitish throat. There is very little published information on this species.

== Distribution and habitat ==
The Mamberamo sunbird is found in the north of New Guinea. It occupies various habitats including forest edge and open scrub.

== Behaviour and ecology ==
=== Breeding ===
The elongated hanging nest is 30–60 cm (12–24 in) in length and has a hooded side entrance. It is usually placed between 0.5 and 1.5 m (1 ft 8 in and 4 ft 11 in) above the ground but can occasionally be as high as 10 m (33 ft). It is constructed by the female using grass, bark, moss, lichens, leaf fragments, vegetable fibres and spider webs. The clutch of 1–3 eggs is incubated by the female. The eggs hatch after 11–16 days and the young are then fed by both parents. The chicks fledge after 13–16 days. Normally several broods are raised each year.

=== Feeding ===
It forages either singly or in small groups. The diet consists of small insects, spiders, nectar and small fruit.
