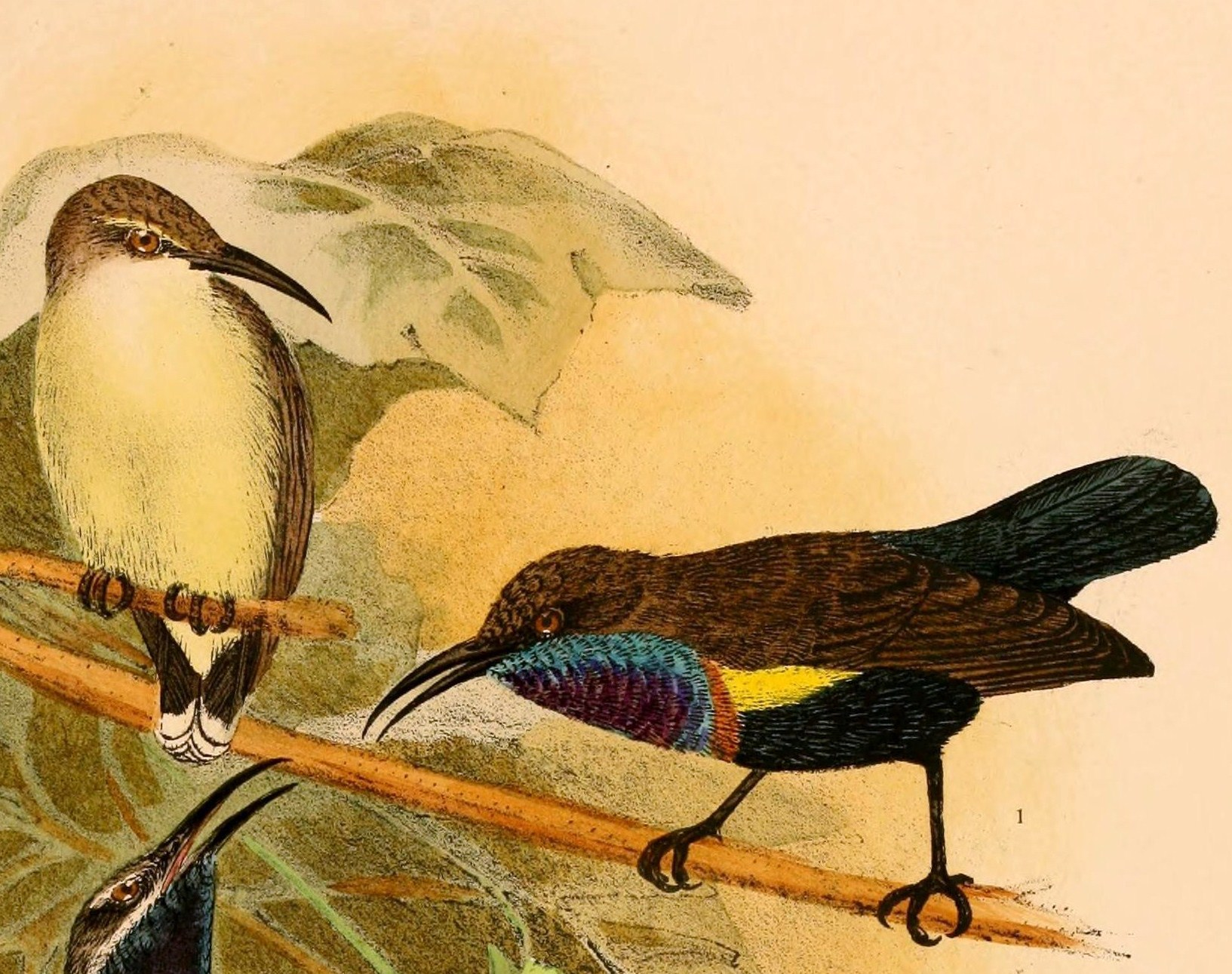

Scientific classification
- Kingdom: Animalia
- Phylum: Chordata
- Class: Aves
- Order: Passeriformes
- Family: Nectariniidae
- Genus: Cinnyris
- Species: C. teysmanni

Binomial name
- Cinnyris teysmanni Büttikofer, 1893

= Flores Sea sunbird =

Species of bird

The Flores Sea sunbird (Cinnyris teysmanni) is a species of bird in the sunbird family Nectariniidae that is found on several small islands in the Flores Sea. It was formerly considered to be a subspecies of the olive-backed sunbird, now renamed the garden sunbird (Cinnyris jugularis).

== Taxonomy ==
The Flores Sea sunbird was formally described in 1893 by the Swiss zoologist Johann Büttikofer based on a specimen that had been collected by the Dutch botanist Johannes Elias Teijsmann. Büttikofer placed it with the sunbirds in the genus Cinnyris and coined the binomial name Cinnyris teysmanni where the specific epithet was chosen to honour the collector. Büttikofer believed that his specimen had been obtained near the port of Makassar in Sulawesi but this was an error as this species does not occur there and in 1896 the German ornithologist Ernst Hartert designated the island of Tanah Jampea in the Flores Sea as the type locality. It was formerly considered as a subspecies of the olive-backed sunbird (renamed as the garden sunbird) (Cinnyris jugularis) but is now treated as a separate species based on the difference in plumage. The species is monotypic: no subspecies are recognised.

== Description ==
The Flores Sea sunbird is 10–11.4 cm (3.9–4.5 in) in length. The male weighs 6.7–11.9 g (0.24–0.42 oz), the female 6–10 g (0.21–0.35 oz). The species is sexual dimorphic. The male is brownish above, the remiges are black with green edging and the black tail has a white tip. The throat, is dark purple of purple-green with green at the sides. Below the throat patch is a dark chestnut or maroon band. The underparts are black with a purple gloss. The iris is dark brown and the legs are black. The female is greenish-olive above, pale yellow below and has a yellow supercilium. The Flores Sea sunbird can be distinguished from the other members of the olive-backed sunbird complex by the male having brown rather than olive-green upperparts and black rather than yellow underparts.

== Distribution and habitat ==
The Flores Sea sunbird is found on the islands of Tanah Jampea, Pulau Kaloa, Pulau Bonerate, Kalaotoa and Palu Madu in the Flores Sea. It occupies various habitats including mangroves, forest edge, open scrub as well as parks and gardens.

== Behaviour and ecology ==
=== Breeding ===
The elongated hanging nest is 30–60 cm (12–24 in) in length and has a hooded side entrance. It is usually placed between 0.5 and 1.5 m (1 ft 8 in and 4 ft 11 in) above the ground but can occasionally be as high as 10 m (33 ft). It is constructed by the female using grass, bark, moss, lichens, leaf fragments, vegetable fibres and spider webs. The clutch of 1–3 eggs is incubated by the female. The eggs hatch after 11–16 days and the young are then fed by both parents. The chicks fledge after 13–16 days. Normally several broods are raised each year.

=== Feeding ===
It forages either singly or in small groups. The diet consists of small insects, spiders, nectar and small fruit.
