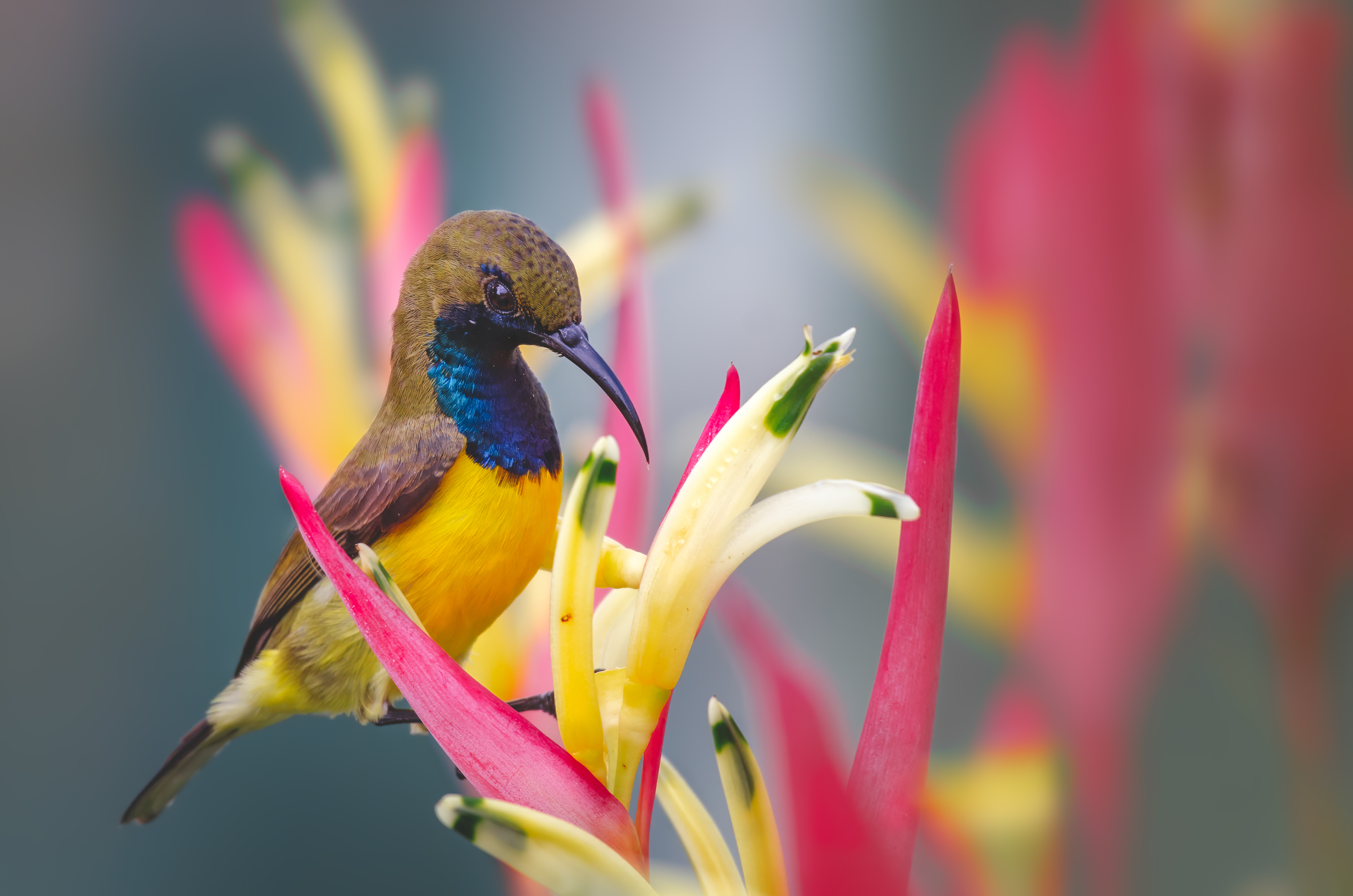
- Male
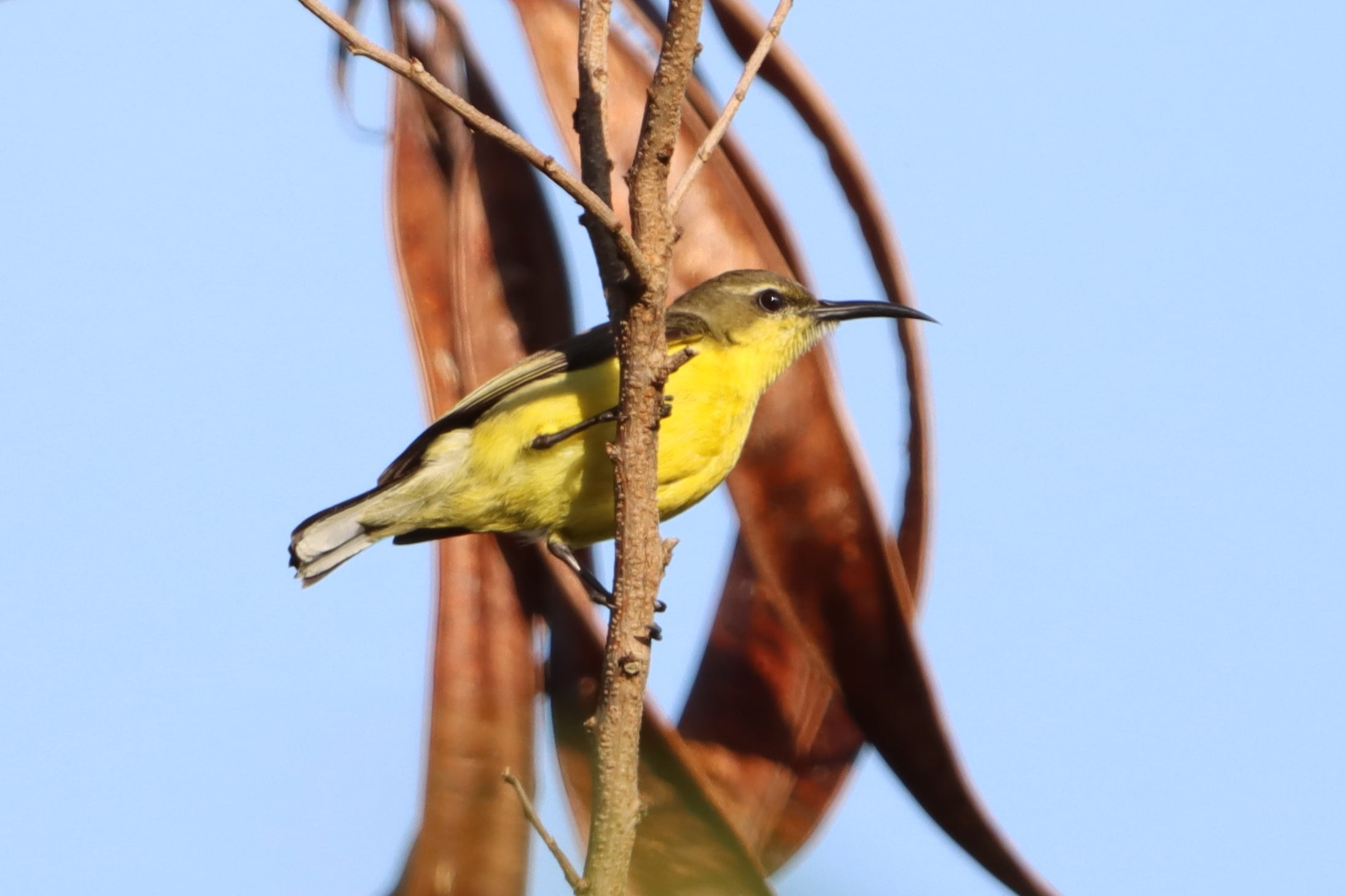
- Female

Conservation status
- Least Concern (IUCN 3.1)

Scientific classification
- Kingdom: Animalia
- Phylum: Chordata
- Class: Aves
- Order: Passeriformes
- Family: Nectariniidae
- Genus: Cinnyris
- Species: C. jugularis

Binomial name
- Cinnyris jugularis (Linnaeus, 1766)

Synonyms
- Certhia jugularis Linnaeus, 1766; Nectarinia jugularis (Linnaeus, 1766)

= Garden sunbird =

Species of bird

The garden sunbird (Cinnyris jugularis), previously known as the olive-backed sunbird, is a species of passerine bird in the family Nectariniidae that is found in the Philippines except on the Palawan island group. It was formerly considered to be conspecific with seven other species: the ornate sunbird, Palawan sunbird, Sahul sunbird, Tukangbesi sunbird, Flores Sea sunbird, South Moluccan sunbird and the Mamberamo sunbird. It is a small, brightly coloured bird with olive-green plumage on the wings and back with a bright yellow chest. It has a long downward-curved bill it uses for taking nectar and capturing insects. It is primarily nectarivorous, but will take insects and spiders, particularly when feeding chicks.

== Taxonomy ==
In 1760 the French zoologist Mathurin Jacques Brisson included a description of the garden sunbird in his Ornithologie based on a specimen collected in the Philippines. He used the French name Le petit grimpereau des Philippines and the Latin Certhia Philippensis Minor. Although Brisson coined Latin names, these do not conform to the binomial system and are not recognised by the International Commission on Zoological Nomenclature. When in 1766 the Swedish naturalist Carl Linnaeus updated his Systema Naturae for the twelfth edition, he added 240 species that had been previously described by Brisson. One of these was the garden sunbird. Linnaeus included a brief description, coined the binomial name Certhia jugularis and cited Brisson's work. The specific name jugularis is Medieval Latin for 'of the throat'. The garden sunbird is now one of 64 species placed in the genus Cinnyris that was introduced by the French naturalist Georges Cuvier in 1816.

The garden sunbird (under the name olive-backed sunbird) formerly included 21 subspecies and had a range that extended from Southeast Asia to Australia. Based on the difference in the male plumage and a genetic study comparing mitochondrial DNA sequences of some of the subspecies, the olive-backed sunbird was split into eight species. The seven new species are: ornate sunbird (Cinnyris ornatus), Palawan sunbird (Cinnyris aurora), Sahul sunbird (Cinnyris frenatus), Tukangbesi sunbird (Cinnyris infrenatus), Flores Sea sunbird (Cinnyris teysmanni), South Moluccan sunbird (Cinnyris clementiae) and Mamberamo sunbird (Cinnyris idenburgi).

Three subspecies are now recognised:

- C. j. obscurior Ogilvie-Grant, 1894 – north Luzon and Babuyan Islands in northern Philippines
- C. j. jugularis (Linnaeus, 1766) – central, south Luzon group, Mindoro, Visayas and Mindanao group (north to south Philippines)
- C. j. woodi (Mearns, 1909) – Sulu Archipelago in southern Philippines

== Description ==
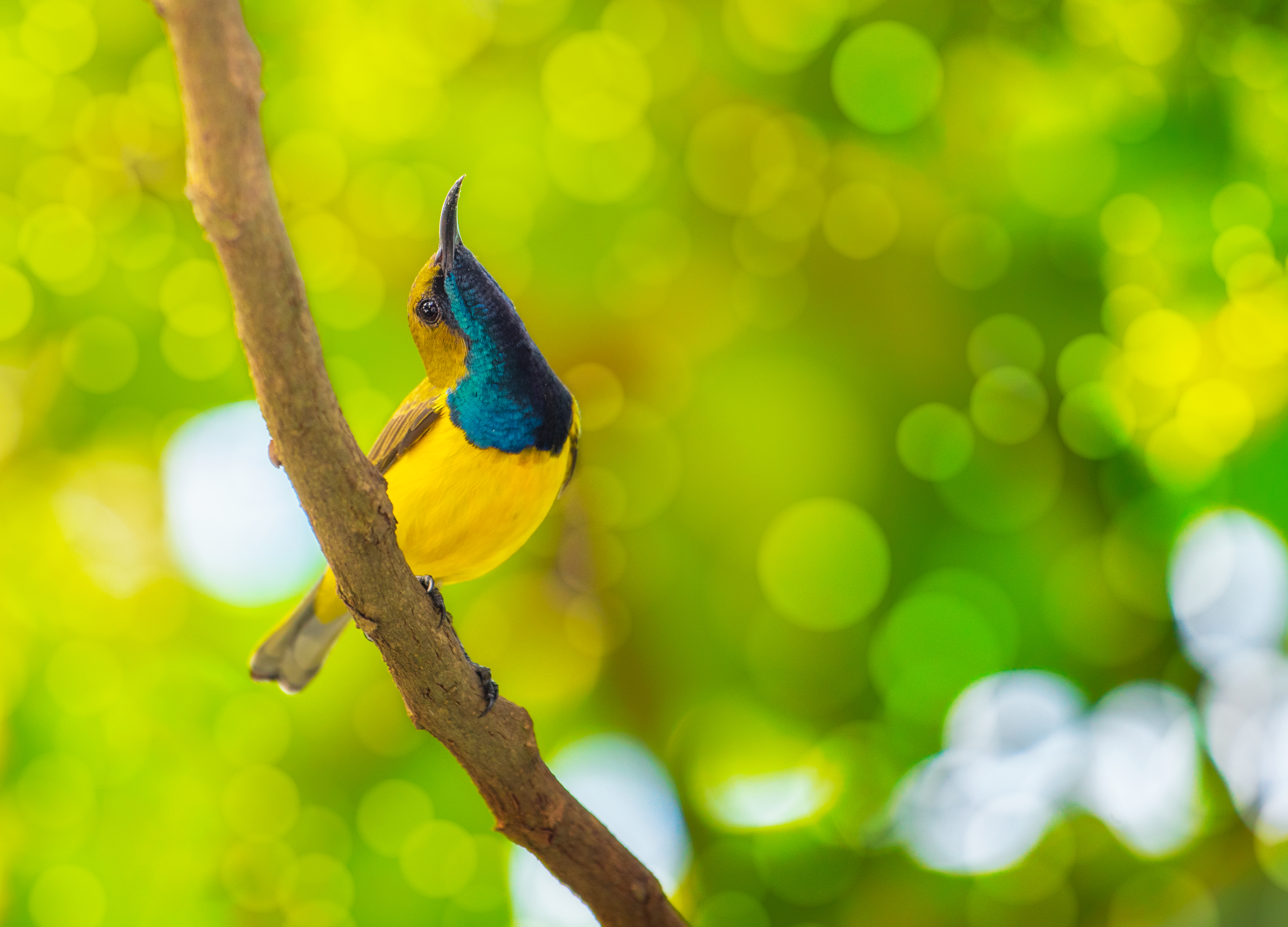
Male (subspecies jugularis), showing its iridescent throat

The garden sunbird is 10–11.4 cm (3.9–4.5 in) in size; males weigh 6.7–11.9 g (0.24–0.42 oz) and females 6–10 g (0.21–0.35 oz). The male in its nominate (jugularis) form displays an olive hue on its upper body, featuring black wing feathers with green edges and a black tail adorned with white tips. The areas around its eyes (lores), neck, chin, throat, and breast are dark and iridescent, accompanied by yellow pectoral tufts. The lower portion of the bird is dark yellow, sometimes with a brown band encircling the gorget area. The iris is dark brown, while its bill and legs are black. Non-breeding males often have the glossy black coloration limited to the central throat stripe, which may represent juvenile birds transitioning to their adult plumage. In contrast, the female exhibits an upper body of greenish olive, featuring a pale-yellowish stripe above the eyes, yellowish borders on its wing feathers, a tail with black and white markings, and a deep yellow color on the lower portion of its body, slightly lighter on the undertail feathers. Juvenile birds resemble the female but tend to be paler and browner in appearance.

== Distribution and habitat ==
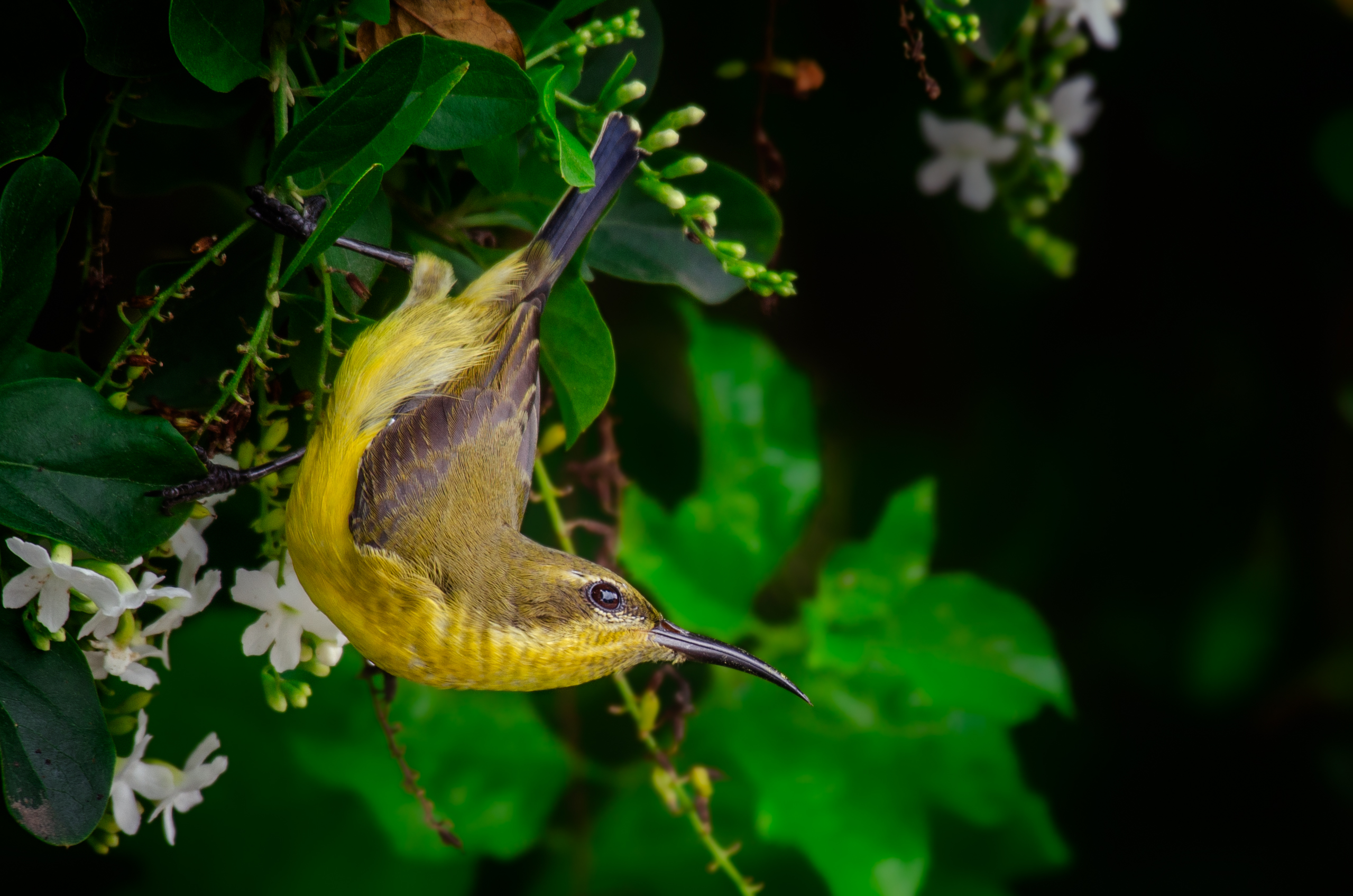
Female garden sunbird

The garden sunbird is found on the Philippine islands except on the Palawan archipelago which is occupied by the similar Palawan sunbird. It inhabits forests, shrublands, grasslands and artificial habitats. The garden sunbird has adapted well to human environments and is common in fairly densely populated areas, where it builds nests in human settlements.

== Behaviour and ecology ==
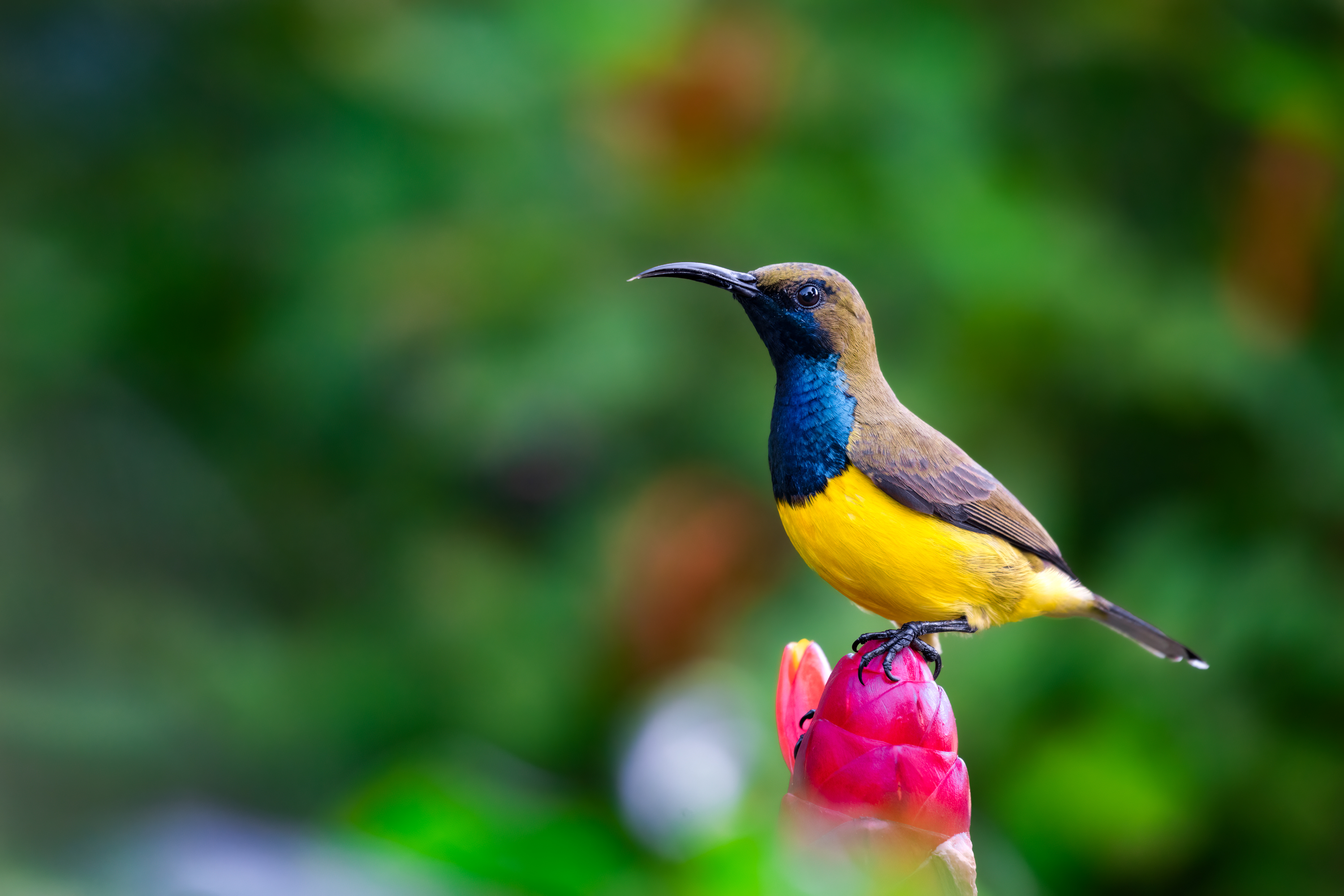
Male on a wild ginger flower

The female garden sunbird builds the nest using grass, cotton, moss, lichens, leaf fragments, vegetable fibers, and spider webs, lined with bark or feathers. The nest has the form of a hanging oval pouch with a sheltered side opening, often featuring a dangling "beard." She lays eggs in May and June. Sunbirds feed largely on nectar, although they will also take insects, especially when feeding young. Most species can take nectar by hovering, but usually perch to feed most of the time.

== Conservation ==
The garden sunbird has been classified as Least Concern on the IUCN Red List as it is common throughout its wide range.
