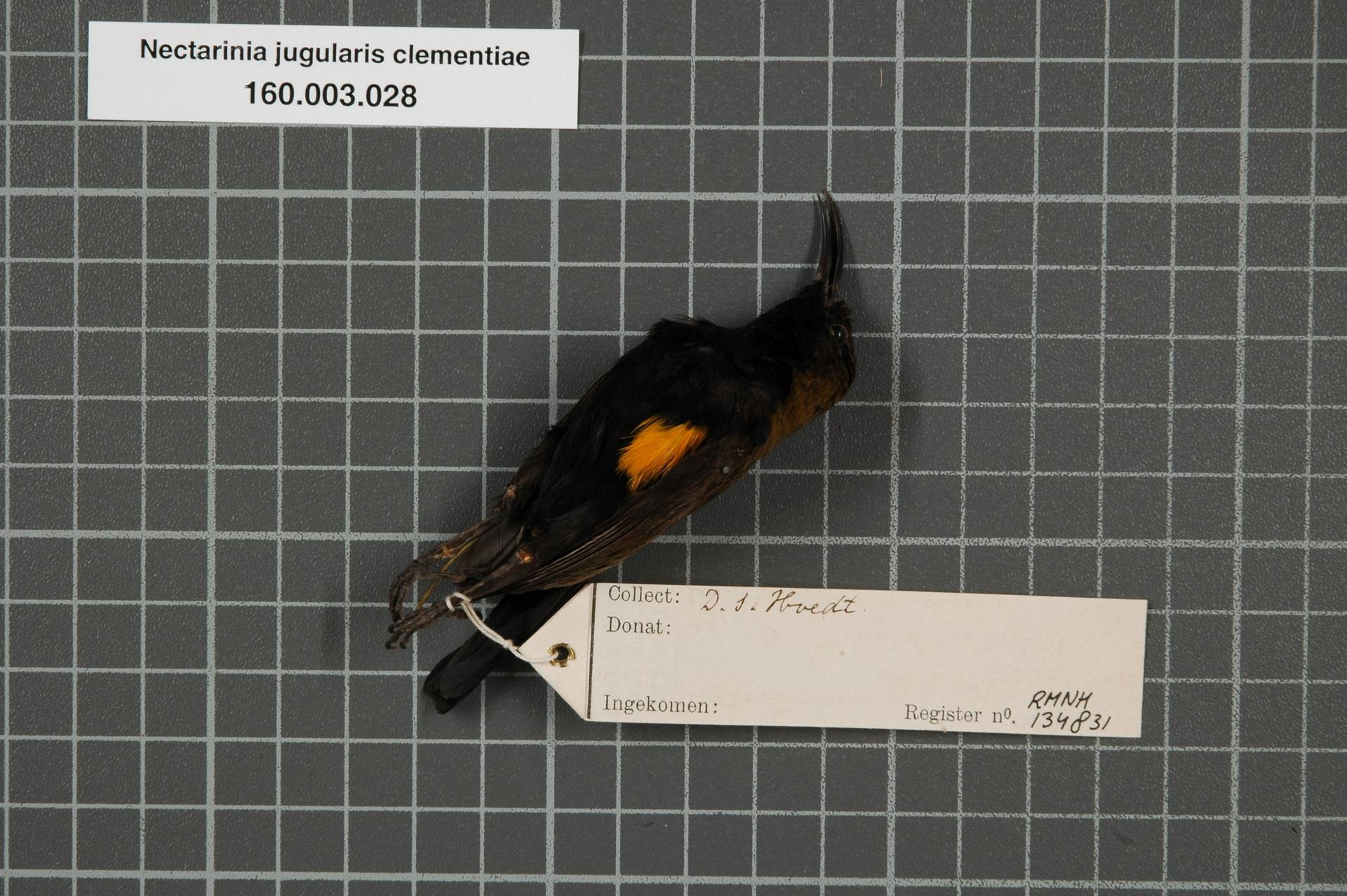

Scientific classification
- Kingdom: Animalia
- Phylum: Chordata
- Class: Aves
- Order: Passeriformes
- Family: Nectariniidae
- Genus: Cinnyris
- Species: C. clementiae

Binomial name
- Cinnyris clementiae Lesson, RP, 1827

= South Moluccan sunbird =

Species of bird

The south Moluccan sunbird (Cinnyris clementiae) is a species of bird in the sunbird family Nectariniidae that found on some of the Maluku Islands, between Sulawesi and New Guinea in Indonesia. It was formerly considered to be a subspecies of the olive-backed sunbird, now renamed the garden sunbird (Cinnyris jugularis).

== Taxonomy ==
The south Moluccan sunbird was formally described in 1827 by the French naturalist René Lesson based on a specimen collected on Ambon Island. He coined the binomial name Cinnyris clementiae, choosing the specific epithet to honour his second wife, the artist and illustrator, Clémence Dumont. It was formerly considered as a subspecies of the olive-backed sunbird (renamed as the garden sunbird) (Cinnyris jugularis) but is now treated as a separate species based on the difference in plumage.

Three subspecies are recognised:

- C. c. buruensis Hartert, EJO, 1910 – Buru (central west Maluku Islands)
- C. c. clementiae Lesson, RP, 1827 – Boana (northwest of Seram), Ambon, Seram (central east Maluku Islands) and the Watubela archipelago (south Maluku Islands)
- C. c. keiensis Stresemann, 1913 – Kai Islands (southeast Maluku Islands)

== Description ==
The south Moluccan sunbird is 10–11.4 cm (3.9–4.5 in) in length. The male weighs 6.7–11.9 g (0.24–0.42 oz), the female 6–10 g (0.21–0.35 oz). The species is sexual dimorphic. The male of the nominate subspecies is olive above, the remiges are black with green edging and the black tail has a white tip. The throat, side of neck, throat and breast are blue iridescent. The underparts are black. The iris is dark brown and the legs are black. The female lacks the iridescent throat and is greenish-olive above and yellow below. This species is distinguished from the other members of the olive-backed sunbird complex by the male having black rather than yellow underparts.

== Distribution and habitat ==
The south Moluccan sunbird is endemic to Buru, Seram Island and the Kai Islands in the Maluku Islands of Indonesia. It is found in various habitats including mangroves, forest edge, open scrub as well as parks and gardens.

== Behaviour and ecology ==
=== Breeding ===
The elongated hanging nest is 30–60 cm (12–24 in) in length and has a hooded side entrance. It is usually placed between 0.5 and 1.5 m (1 ft 8 in and 4 ft 11 in) above the ground but can occasionally be as high as 10 m (33 ft). It is constructed by the female using grass, bark, moss, lichens, leaf fragments, vegetable fibres and spider webs. The clutch of 1–3 eggs is incubated by the female. The eggs hatch after 11–16 days and the young are then fed by both parents. The chicks fledge after 13–16 days. Normally several broods are raised each year.

=== Feeding ===
It forages either singly or in small groups. The diet consists of small insects, spiders, nectar and small fruit.
