= Chuckchucha =

Chuckchucha Pum-pai Chukchuka
- village
- Location in Andaman and Nicobar Islands, India Chuckchucha (India)
- Coordinates: 9.216427°N 92.808487°E
- Country: India
- State: Andaman and Nicobar Islands
- District: Nicobar
- Tehsil: Car Nicobar

Population (2011)
  - Total: 1,021
- Time zone: UTC+5:30 (IST)
- Census code: 645023

Chuckchucha is a village in the Nicobar district of Andaman and Nicobar Islands, India. It is located in the Car Nicobar tehsil. The headquarters of the island's central tribal cooperative society 'Ellon Hinengo Limited'(EHL) was established here in 1945. The society was started by the Jadwet family of Burma (Myanmar).

== Demographics ==
According to the 2011 census of India, Chuckchucha has 231 households. The effective literacy rate (i.e. the literacy rate of population excluding children aged 6 and below) is 74.23%.

Demographics (2011 Census)
	Total	Male	Female
Population	1021	536	485
Children aged below 6 years	109	60	49
Scheduled caste	0	0	0
Scheduled tribe	485	243	242
Literates	677	372	305
Workers (all)	287	244	43
Main workers (total)	155	136	19
Main workers: Cultivators	0	0	0
Main workers: Agricultural labourers	0	0	0
Main workers: Household industry workers	0	0	0
Main workers: Other	155	136	19
Marginal workers (total)	132	108	24
Marginal workers: Cultivators	0	0	0
Marginal workers: Agricultural labourers	1	0	1
Marginal workers: Household industry workers	17	1	16
Marginal workers: Others	114	107	7
Non-workers	734	292	442
