= Tamaloo =

Tamaloo Tim-lö Tamalu
- village
- Location in Andaman and Nicobar Islands, India Tamaloo (India)
- Coordinates: 9.191412°N 92.818068°E
- Country: India
- State: Andaman and Nicobar Islands
- District: Nicobar
- Tehsil: Car Nicobar

Population (2011)
  - Total: 1,515
- Time zone: UTC+5:30 (IST)
- Census code: 645021

Tamaloo is a village in the Nicobar district of Andaman and Nicobar Islands, India. It is located in the Car Nicobar tehsil.

== Demographics ==
According to the 2011 census of India, Tamaloo has 379 households. The effective literacy rate (i.e. the literacy rate of population excluding children aged 6 and below) is 74.01%.

Demographics (2011 Census)
	Total	Male	Female
Population	1515	746	769
Children aged below 6 years	157	82	75
Scheduled caste	0	0	0
Scheduled tribe	1481	727	754
Literates	1005	529	476
Workers (all)	804	452	352
Main workers (total)	189	155	34
Main workers: Cultivators	0	0	0
Main workers: Agricultural labourers	0	0	0
Main workers: Household industry workers	10	10	0
Main workers: Other	179	145	34
Marginal workers (total)	615	297	318
Marginal workers: Cultivators	0	0	0
Marginal workers: Agricultural labourers	1	0	1
Marginal workers: Household industry workers	148	16	132
Marginal workers: Others	466	281	185
Non-workers	711	294	417
