= Tapoiming =

Tapoiming Höng-chu
- village
- Location in Andaman and Nicobar Islands, India Tapoiming (India)
- Coordinates: 9.223660°N 92.800452°E
- Country: India
- State: Andaman and Nicobar Islands
- District: Nicobar
- Tehsil: Car Nicobar

Population (2011)
  - Total: 941
- Time zone: UTC+5:30 (IST)
- Census code: 645024

Tapoiming is a village in the Nicobar district of Andaman and Nicobar Islands, India. It is located in the Car Nicobar tehsil.

== Demographics ==
According to the 2011 census of India, Tapoiming has 214 households. The effective literacy rate (i.e. the literacy rate of population excluding children aged 6 and below) is 78.59%.

Demographics (2011 Census)
	Total	Male	Female
Population	941	505	436
Children aged below 6 years	105	62	43
Scheduled caste	0	0	0
Scheduled tribe	851	416	435
Literates	657	382	275
Workers (all)	338	281	57
Main workers (total)	53	43	10
Main workers: Cultivators	0	0	0
Main workers: Agricultural labourers	0	0	0
Main workers: Household industry workers	1	0	1
Main workers: Other	52	43	9
Marginal workers (total)	285	238	47
Marginal workers: Cultivators	10	8	2
Marginal workers: Agricultural labourers	15	7	8
Marginal workers: Household industry workers	13	2	11
Marginal workers: Others	247	221	26
Non-workers	603	224	379
