= Perka, Car Nicobar =

Perka Kè-è-rô
- village
- Location in Andaman and Nicobar Islands, India Perka (India)
- Coordinates: 9.178683°N 92.818258°E
- Country: India
- State: Andaman and Nicobar Islands
- District: Nicobar
- Tehsil: Car Nicobar

Population (2011)
  - Total: 2,527
- Time zone: UTC+5:30 (IST)
- Census code: 645020

Perka is a village in the Nicobar district of Andaman and Nicobar Islands, India. It is located in the Car Nicobar tehsil.

== Demographics ==
According to the 2011 census of India, Perka has 711 households. The effective literacy rate (i.e. the literacy rate of population excluding children aged 6 and below) is 74.71%.

Demographics (2011 Census)
	Total	Male	Female
Population	2527	1363	1164
Children aged below 6 years	273	132	141
Scheduled caste	0	0	0
Scheduled tribe	1709	863	846
Literates	1684	999	685
Workers (all)	1057	788	269
Main workers (total)	682	527	155
Main workers: Cultivators	17	14	3
Main workers: Agricultural labourers	3	3	0
Main workers: Household industry workers	27	19	8
Main workers: Other	635	491	144
Marginal workers (total)	375	261	114
Marginal workers: Cultivators	4	3	1
Marginal workers: Agricultural labourers	4	2	2
Marginal workers: Household industry workers	152	103	49
Marginal workers: Others	215	153	62
Non-workers	1470	575	895
