= Arong, Car Nicobar =

Arong Ha-ran
- village
- Location in Andaman and Nicobar Islands, India Arong (India)
- Coordinates: 9.162116°N 92.750611°E
- Country: India
- State: Andaman and Nicobar Islands
- District: Nicobar
- Tehsil: Car Nicobar

Population (2011)
  - Total: 1,194
- Time zone: UTC+5:30 (IST)
- Census code: 645015

Arong is a village in the Nicobar district of Andaman and Nicobar Islands, India. It is located in the Car Nicobar tehsil.

== Demographics ==
According to the 2011 census of India, Arong has 233 households. The effective literacy rate (i.e. the literacy rate of population excluding children aged 6 and below) is 87.73%.

Demographics (2011 Census)
	Total	Male	Female
Population	1194	617	577
Children aged below 6 years	183	87	96
Scheduled caste	0	0	0
Scheduled tribe	1117	584	533
Literates	887	475	412
Workers (all)	527	349	178
Main workers (total)	506	343	163
Main workers: Cultivators	10	7	3
Main workers: Agricultural labourers	4	3	1
Main workers: Household industry workers	177	131	46
Main workers: Other	315	202	113
Marginal workers (total)	21	6	15
Marginal workers: Cultivators	1	0	1
Marginal workers: Agricultural labourers	0	0	0
Marginal workers: Household industry workers	11	0	11
Marginal workers: Others	9	6	3
Non-workers	667	268	399
