= Kimois =

Kimois Öt-ra-höön Kimius
- village
- Location in Andaman and Nicobar Islands, India Kimois (India)
- Coordinates: 9.153889°N 92.762310°E
- Country: India
- State: Andaman and Nicobar Islands
- District: Nicobar
- Tehsil: Car Nicobar

Population (2011)
  - Total: 382
- Time zone: UTC+5:30 (IST)
- Census code: 645016

Kimois is a village in the Nicobar district of Andaman and Nicobar Islands, India. It is located in the Car Nicobar tehsil.

== Demographics ==
According to the 2011 census of India, Kimois has 92 households. The effective literacy rate (i.e. the literacy rate of population excluding children aged 6 and below) is 78.42%.

Demographics (2011 Census)
	Total	Male	Female
Population	382	224	158
Children aged below 6 years	53	30	23
Scheduled caste	0	0	0
Scheduled tribe	382	224	158
Literates	258	163	95
Workers (all)	285	166	119
Main workers (total)	15	12	3
Main workers: Cultivators	0	0	0
Main workers: Agricultural labourers	0	0	0
Main workers: Household industry workers	0	0	0
Main workers: Other	15	12	3
Marginal workers (total)	270	154	116
Marginal workers: Cultivators	1	1	0
Marginal workers: Agricultural labourers	1	1	0
Marginal workers: Household industry workers	0	0	0
Marginal workers: Others	268	152	116
Non-workers	97	58	39
