= Sawai, Car Nicobar =

Sawai Öt-ka-sip
- village
- Location in Andaman and Nicobar Islands, India Sawai (India)
- Coordinates: 9.211778°N 92.727742°E
- Country: India
- State: Andaman and Nicobar Islands
- District: Nicobar
- Tehsil: Car Nicobar

Population (2011)
  - Total: 1,247
- Time zone: UTC+5:30 (IST)
- Census code: 645014

Sawai (also known as Öt-ka-sip) is a village in the Nicobar district of Andaman and Nicobar Islands, India. It is located in the Car Nicobar tehsil.

== Demographics ==
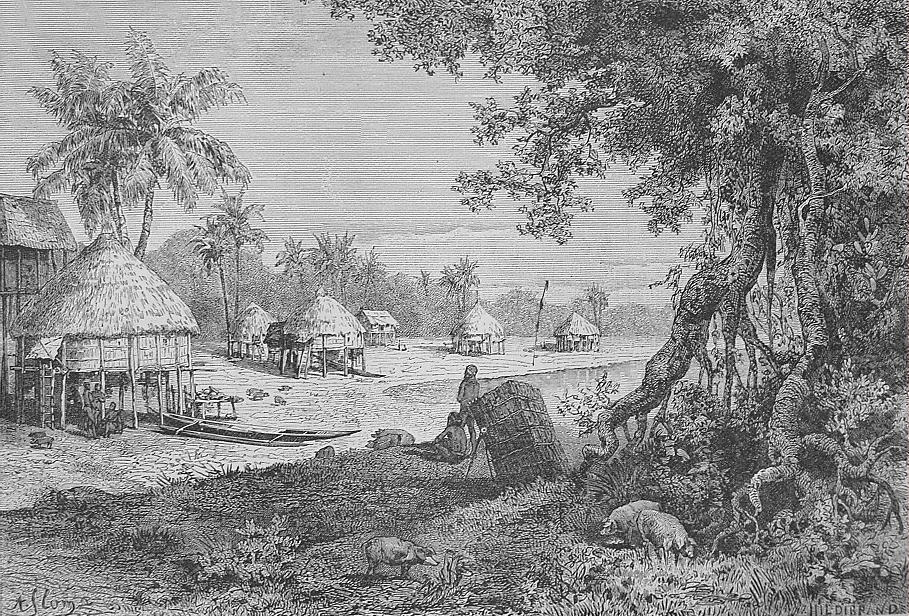
Landscape of Sawai village in 1884

According to the 2011 census of India, Sawai has 286 households. The effective literacy rate (i.e. the literacy rate of population excluding children aged 6 and below) is 86.23%.

Demographics (2011 Census)
	Total	Male	Female
Population	1247	632	615
Children aged below 6 years	172	86	86
Scheduled caste	0	0	0
Scheduled tribe	1212	614	598
Literates	927	483	444
Workers (all)	822	448	374
Main workers (total)	96	76	20
Main workers: Cultivators	3	1	2
Main workers: Agricultural labourers	0	0	0
Main workers: Household industry workers	1	0	1
Main workers: Other	92	75	17
Marginal workers (total)	726	372	354
Marginal workers: Cultivators	3	1	2
Marginal workers: Agricultural labourers	3	2	1
Marginal workers: Household industry workers	259	138	121
Marginal workers: Others	461	231	230
Non-workers	425	184	241
