= Big Lapati =

Big Lapati Tö-ki-röng Sē-ti Big Lapathy / Lopate
- village
- Location in Andaman and Nicobar Islands, India Big Lapati (India)
- Coordinates: 9.229877°N 92.789208°E
- Country: India
- State: Andaman and Nicobar Islands
- District: Nicobar
- Tehsil: Car Nicobar

Population (2011)
  - Total: 1,098
- Time zone: UTC+5:30 (IST)
- Census code: 645025

Big Lapati is a village in the Nicobar district of Andaman and Nicobar Islands, India. It is located in the Car Nicobar tehsil, near Small Lapati.

== Demographics ==
According to the 2011 census of India, Big Lapati has 271 households. The effective literacy rate (i.e. the literacy rate of population excluding children aged 6 and below) is 76.27%.

Demographics (2011 Census)
	Total	Male	Female
Population	1098	584	514
Children aged below 6 years	133	68	65
Scheduled caste	0	0	0
Scheduled tribe	1057	549	508
Literates	736	413	323
Workers (all)	657	368	289
Main workers (total)	122	86	36
Main workers: Cultivators	2	1	1
Main workers: Agricultural labourers	3	3	0
Main workers: Household industry workers	45	31	14
Main workers: Other	72	51	21
Marginal workers (total)	535	282	253
Marginal workers: Cultivators	1	1	0
Marginal workers: Agricultural labourers	7	3	4
Marginal workers: Household industry workers	481	248	233
Marginal workers: Others	46	30	16
Non-workers	441	216	225
