= Kakana, Car Nicobar =

Kakana Sa-pë-ha
- village
- Location in Andaman and Nicobar Islands, India Kakana (India)
- Coordinates: 9.157827°N 92.799540°E
- Country: India
- State: Andaman and Nicobar Islands
- District: Nicobar
- Tehsil: Car Nicobar

Population (2011)
  - Total: 841
- Time zone: UTC+5:30 (IST)
- Census code: 645017

Kakana is a village in the Nicobar district of Andaman and Nicobar Islands, India. It is located in the Car Nicobar tehsil.

== Demographics ==
According to the 2011 census of India, Kakana has 231 households. The effective literacy rate (i.e. the literacy rate of population excluding children aged 6 and below) is 74.73%.

Demographics (2011 Census)
	Total	Male	Female
Population	841	456	385
Children aged below 6 years	93	55	38
Scheduled caste	0	0	0
Scheduled tribe	838	455	383
Literates	559	335	224
Workers (all)	299	247	52
Main workers (total)	29	26	3
Main workers: Cultivators	3	2	1
Main workers: Agricultural labourers	0	0	0
Main workers: Household industry workers	1	1	0
Main workers: Other	25	23	2
Marginal workers (total)	270	221	49
Marginal workers: Cultivators	0	0	0
Marginal workers: Agricultural labourers	1	1	0
Marginal workers: Household industry workers	239	192	47
Marginal workers: Others	30	28	2
Non-workers	542	209	333
