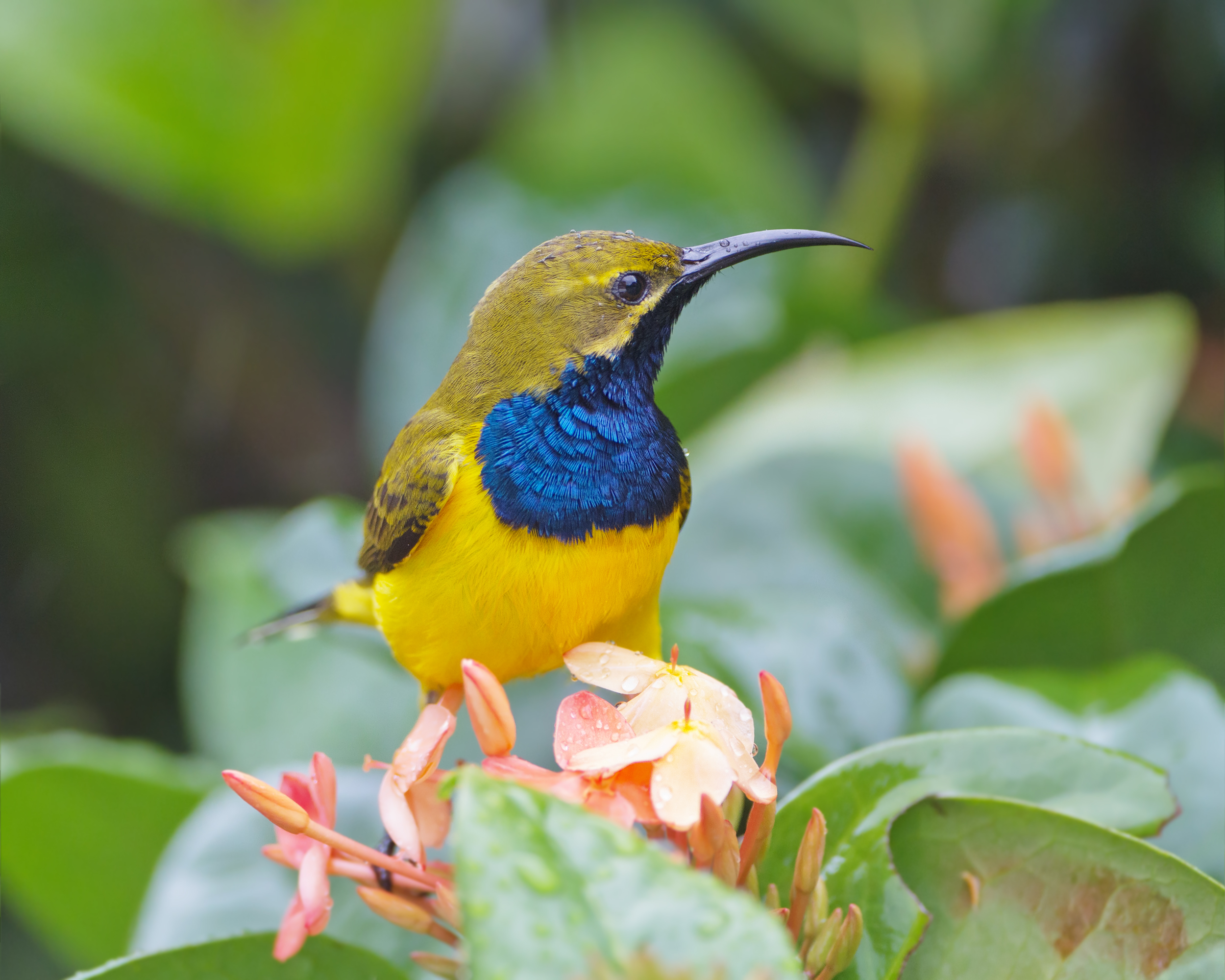

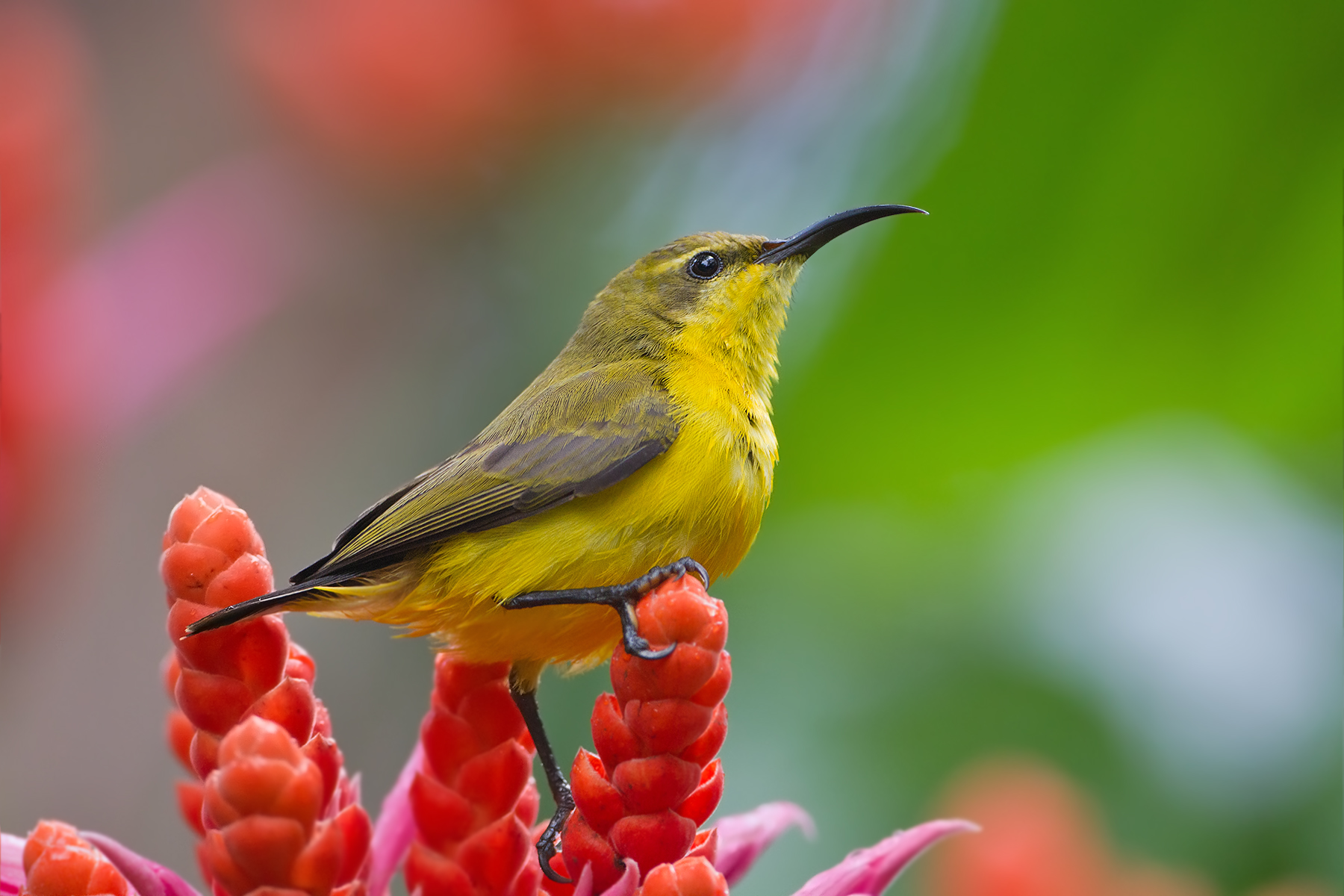
- Male above, female below

Scientific classification
- Kingdom: Animalia
- Phylum: Chordata
- Class: Aves
- Order: Passeriformes
- Family: Nectariniidae
- Genus: Cinnyris
- Species: C. frenatus

Binomial name
- Cinnyris frenatus (Müller, S, 1843)

= Sahul sunbird =

Species of bird

The Sahul sunbird (Cinnyris frenatus) is a species of bird in the sunbird family Nectariniidae that is endemic to Sulawesi eastwards to New Guinea and the Solomon Islands. It is also found in northeast Australia. It was formerly considered to be a subspecies of the olive-backed sunbird, now renamed the garden sunbird (Cinnyris jugularis).

== Taxonomy ==
The Sahul sunbird was formally described in 1843 by the German naturalist Salomon Müller based on a specimen collected on the west coast of New Guinea. He coined the binomial name Nectarinia frenata. The specific epithet frenatus is Latin meaning "bridled". The species was subsequently moved to the genus Cinnyris that had been introduced in 1816 by the French naturalist Georges Cuvier. The Sahul sunbird was formerly considered as a subspecies of the olive-backed sunbird (now the garden sunbird (Cinnyris jugularis) but is now treated as a separate species based on the differences in plumage and the mitochondrial DNA sequence.

Four subspecies are recognised:

- C. f. plateni (Blasius, W, 1885) – Talaud Islands (northeast of Sulawesi), Sulawesi and satellites
- C. f. robustirostris (Mees, 1964) – Banggai Islands and Sula Island (east of Sulawesi)
- C. f. frenatus (Müller, S, 1843) – Morotai to Obi Islands (north Moluccas), New Guinea (except north) and satellites (exceptTrobriand Islands, Woodlark Island and Louisiade Archipelago, southeast of New Guinea), Aru Islands (southwest of New Guinea) and northeast Queensland (far northeast Australia)
- C. f. flavigastra (Gould, 1843) – Bismarck Archipelago including Ninigo and Hermit Islands, and north, central south Solomon Islands to Guadalcanal and Malaita

== Description ==
The Sahul sunbird is 10–11.4 cm (3.9–4.5 in) in length. The male weighs 6.7–11.9 g (0.24–0.42 oz), the female 6–10 g (0.21–0.35 oz). The species is sexual dimorphic. The male of the nominate subspecies is olive above, the remiges are black with green edging and the black tail has a white tip. The throat, side of neck and breast are blue-black iridescent. It has a yellow supercilium and a yellow moustachial stripe. The underparts are yellow. The iris is dark brown and the legs are black. The female lacks the iridescent throat patch.

== Distribution and habitat ==
The Sahul sunbird is a resident species from Sulawesi and the Maluku Islands to New Guinea, the Aru Islands, the Bismarck Archipelago, northern Solomon Islands and northeastern Australia. It is found in various habitats including mangroves, forest edge, open scrub as well as parks and gardens.

== Behaviour and ecology ==
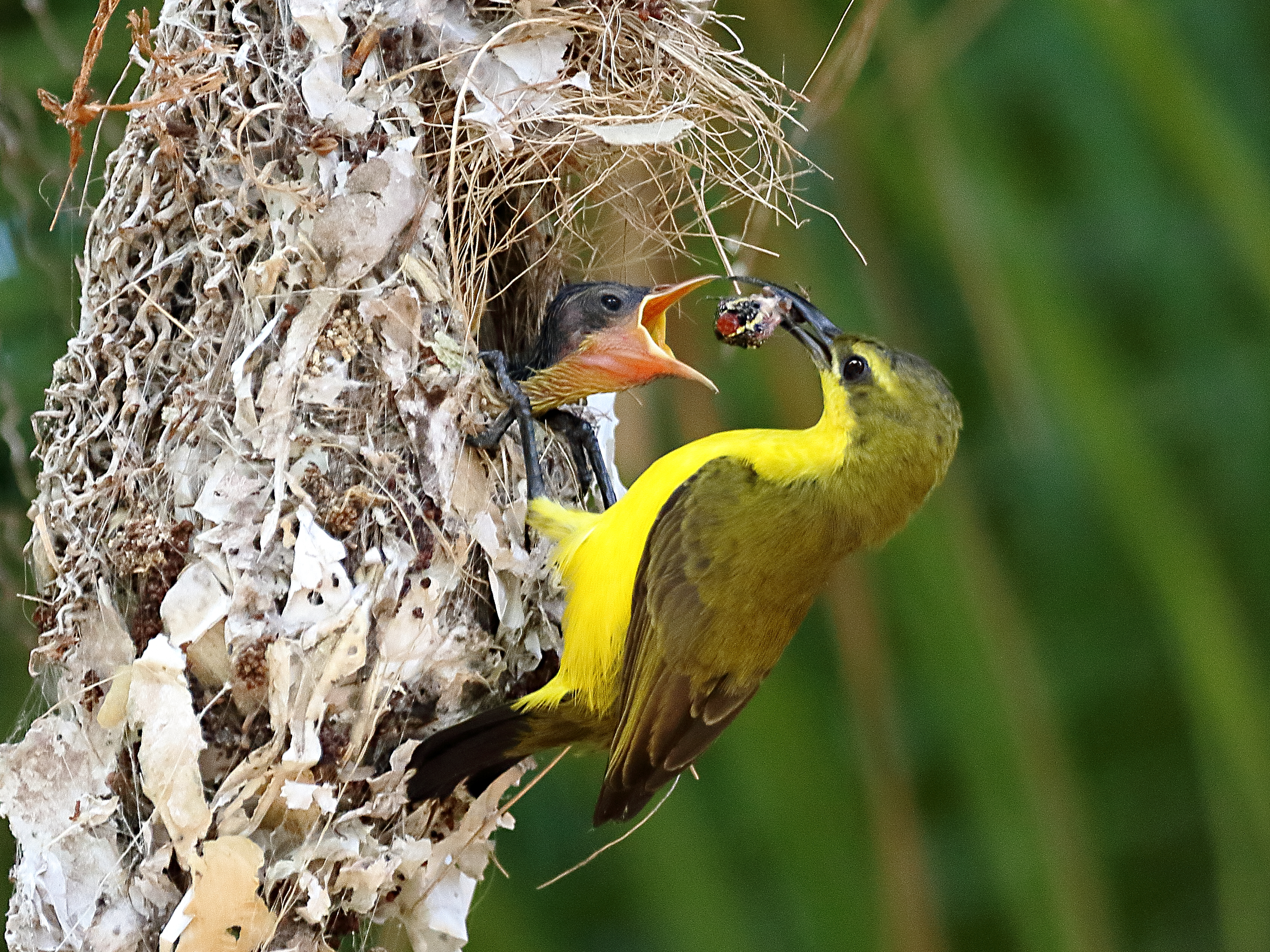
Female feeding chick in nest

=== Breeding ===
The elongated hanging nest is 30–60 cm (12–24 in) in length and has a hooded side entrance. It is usually placed between 0.5 and 1.5 m (1 ft 8 in and 4 ft 11 in) above the ground but can occasionally be as high as 10 m (33 ft). It is constructed by the female using grass, bark, moss, lichens, leaf fragments, vegetable fibres and spider webs. The clutch of 1–3 eggs is incubated by the female. The eggs hatch after 11–16 days and the young are then fed by both parents. The chicks fledge after 13–16 days. Normally several broods are raised each year.

=== Feeding ===
It forages either singly or in small groups. The diet consists of small insects, spiders, nectar and small fruit.
