= Car Nicobar =

One of the Nicobar Islands

Native name: Pū
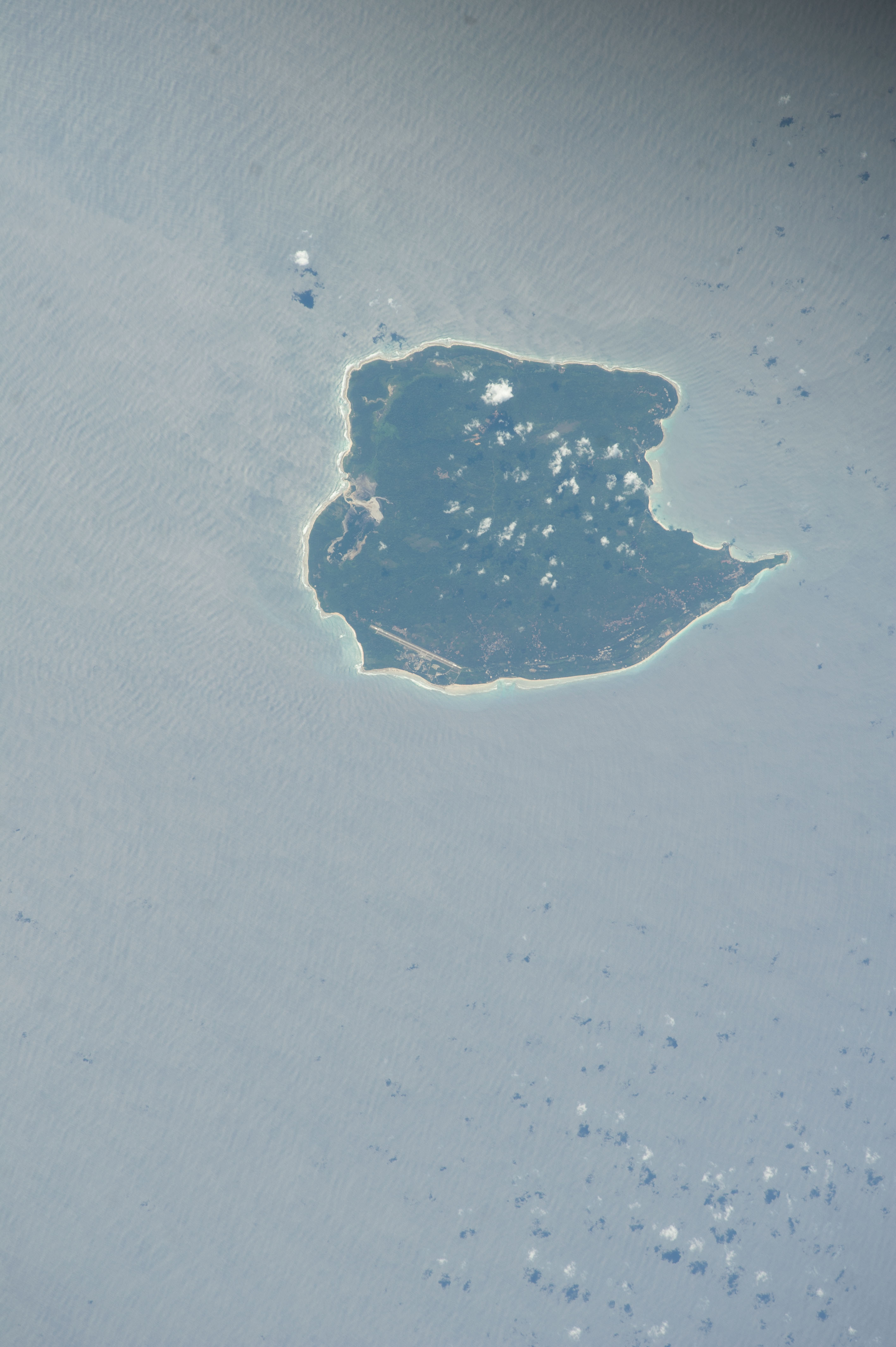
- Satellite image of Car Nicobar

- Location within Andaman and Nicobar Islands Location within Bay of Bengal

Geography
- Location: Bay of Bengal
- Coordinates: 9.17°N 92.78°E
- Archipelago: Nicobar Islands
- Adjacent to: Indian Ocean
- Total islands: 1
- Major islands: Car Nicobar
- Area: 126.9 km^{2} (49.0 sq mi)
- Length: 15 km (9.3 mi)
- Width: 12 km (7.5 mi)
- Coastline: 51 km (31.7 mi)
- Highest elevation: 10 m (30 ft)

Administration
- India
- District: Nicobar
- Island group: Nicobar Islands
- Subdivisions of India: Car Nicobar Subdivision
- Taluk: Car Nicobar Taluk
- Largest settlement: Malacca (pop. 1,637)

Demographics
- Population: 17841 (2014)
- Pop. density: 140.5/km^{2} (363.9/sq mi)
- Ethnic groups: Hindu, Nicobarese

Additional information
- Time zone: IST (UTC+5:30)
- PIN: 744301
- Telephone code: 03193
- ISO code: IN-AN-00
- Official website: www.and.nic.in
- Literacy: 84.4%
- Avg. summer temperature: 30.2 °C (86.4 °F)
- Avg. winter temperature: 23.0 °C (73.4 °F)
- Sex ratio: 1.2♂/♀
- Census code: 35.638.0001
- Official languages: Hindi, English, Tamil; Car (regional)

Car Nicobar (Car Nicobarese: Pū) is the northernmost of the Nicobar Islands. It is also one of the three local administrative divisions of the Indian district of Nicobar, part of the Indian union territory of the Andaman and Nicobar Islands. Annual rainfall is 2,800 millimetres or 110 inches.

== History ==
The seafarers of the region referred to the island as the "northern land of the nake" i.e. Car Nakkavar which is perhaps the direct predecessor of the current name Car Nicobar.

=== 2004 tsunami devastation ===
The island was severely affected by the tsunami that was caused by the 2004 Indian Ocean earthquake, which led to many deaths and damaged infrastructure. Car Nicobar lies 750 km (470 mi) from the epicenter of the 2004 Indian Ocean earthquake, and the ensuing tsunamis struck it with great force. Witnesses reported the waves were as high as 30 ft (9 m). As of December 30, 2004, the number of casualties remained unknown, but were estimated to be high. One survivor told the Associated Press: "There's not a single hut which is standing. Everything is gone. Most of the people have gone away from the shore and Indian govt has made many relief programmes here such as temporary shelters, subsidize their every primary needs etc."

== Aviation ==
Car Nicobar hosts a strategically important Indian Air Force base, which evolved from a wartime strip built by the British in the 1940s. The IAF later expanded it into a permanent staging base for operations across the eastern seaboard and island territories.

== Geography ==
Car Nicobar falls in between Little Andaman and Nancowry. The area south to the Ten-degree channel comes under Car Nicobar headquarters. Car Nicobar is remarkably flat except for some cliffs in the north and small hilly areas in the interior. It is bordered by a silvery beach and areas of flat ground consisting of coraline diluvium. It is a flat fertile island covered with clusters of coconut palms and enchanting beaches with a roaring sea all around.

Compared to the Middle Andaman and South Andaman, Car Nicobar is a small island, having only 126.9 km^{2} (49.0 sq mi).

The soil analysis revealed a high content of sand & clay hindering the growth of agricultural crops. The area of Car Nicobar is suitable for the plantation crops, and coconut and areca nut are the major products, which are grown in the area.

=== Climate ===
The climate of Car Nicobar is a tropical monsoon climate (Köppen: Am), as it is just 9 degrees from the equator, with an annual rainfall of 2,600 millimetres or 100 inches. The data of past thirty years shows that the mean relative humidity in the island is 79 percent, the mean maximum temperature is 31.4 °C or 88.5 °F, and mean minimum temperature is 23.8 °C or 74.8 °F.

Climate data for Car Nicobar (1991–2020, extremes 1952–2020)
Month	Jan	Feb	Mar	Apr	May	Jun	Jul	Aug	Sep	Oct	Nov	Dec	Year
Record high °C (°F)	35.0 (95.0)	38.0 (100.4)	36.0 (96.8)	37.2 (99.0)	38.0 (100.4)	37.0 (98.6)	37.0 (98.6)	37.5 (99.5)	36.0 (96.8)	38.1 (100.6)	37.0 (98.6)	36.2 (97.2)	38.0 (100.4)
Mean daily maximum °C (°F)	31.2 (88.2)	31.7 (89.1)	32.2 (90.0)	32.5 (90.5)	31.5 (88.7)	30.9 (87.6)	30.8 (87.4)	30.8 (87.4)	30.3 (86.5)	30.6 (87.1)	31.0 (87.8)	30.9 (87.6)	31.2 (88.2)
Mean daily minimum °C (°F)	24.3 (75.7)	23.7 (74.7)	23.3 (73.9)	23.6 (74.5)	24.2 (75.6)	24.4 (75.9)	24.2 (75.6)	23.9 (75.0)	23.2 (73.8)	23.2 (73.8)	23.7 (74.7)	24.1 (75.4)	23.8 (74.8)
Record low °C (°F)	11.0 (51.8)	12.0 (53.6)	10.9 (51.6)	15.4 (59.7)	16.4 (61.5)	15.6 (60.1)	15.6 (60.1)	15.8 (60.4)	14.2 (57.6)	15.0 (59.0)	13.4 (56.1)	11.9 (53.4)	11.0 (51.8)
Average rainfall mm (inches)	90.0 (3.54)	35.9 (1.41)	70.5 (2.78)	109.2 (4.30)	333.2 (13.12)	316.8 (12.47)	249.4 (9.82)	267.6 (10.54)	382.8 (15.07)	282.1 (11.11)	267.1 (10.52)	174.7 (6.88)	2,579.4 (101.55)
Average rainy days	4.3	2.5	3.1	5.9	14.3	13.6	12.4	12.6	15.8	14.3	12.0	7.5	118.2
Average relative humidity (%) (at 17:30 IST)	79	77	76	77	84	85	85	86	88	89	86	83	83
Source: India Meteorological Department

== Administration ==
Car Nicobar, along with neighboring Battimalv Island, is a tehsil. There are two more Tehsils of Nancowry and Campbell Bay to administer all the other islands of the district. The administrative capital is near the Indian Air Force station Car Nicobar Air Force Base, known as 'Headquarters' which is the largest junction in this small island with some shops, a hospital, a bank, a post office, Office of Superintendent of Police, Office of Deputy Commissioner and some other government offices. The official pin code of Car Nicobar is 744301.

Although the area of Car Nicobar is less than 7% of the area of the Nicobar group, in the census of 2011 its population of 17841 was 48% of the total population of Nicobar.

== Flora and fauna ==
The Car Nicobar islands do not have any evergreen forests, which dominate the central and southern islands of the Nicobars. Most of the island is covered with coconut plantation and natural flora is present only in the interior areas.

=== Important Bird Area ===
The island has been designated an Important Bird Area (IBA) by BirdLife International because it supports populations of various restricted-range or threatened bird species. These include Nicobar sparrowhawks, Nicobar serpent-eagles, Andaman wood pigeons, Andaman cuckoo-doves, Andaman boobooks, white-headed starlings and Nicobar green imperial pigeons.

== Transport ==
Car Nicobar the district headquarters is 260 km (162 mi) from Port Blair. Ship service is available between Port Blair and Nicobar district. Normally ship is available twice in a week. One can obtain the ship ticket from the office of the Director, Shipping services (03192-245555) at Port Blair.

Andaman and Nicobar Islands Administration in cooperation with Indian Air Force operate charter services between Port Blair's Veer Savarkar International Airport, Campbell Bay and Car Nicobar Air Force Base. There is also regular service of Pawan Hans helicopter available between Car Nicobar and Port Blair and other islands of the Nicobar district.

== Demographics ==
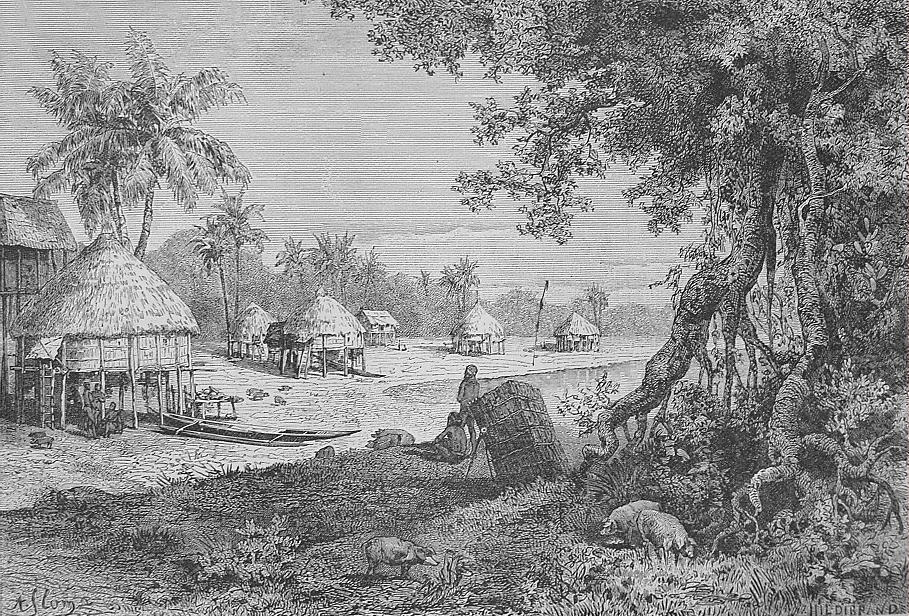
Landscape of Sawai village in 1884

There are 21 villages, the largest of which is named U-rèk-ka (called "Malacca-Perka" for tourists), with a population of 4,200.

The villages are:

- Ha-nyôch (Mus)
- Tö-kuö-nö Sē-ti (Small Lapathy)
- Tö-ki-röng Sē-ti (Big Lapathy)
- Höng-chu (Tapoiming)
- Pum-pai (Chukchucha)
- Sa-rā-ki (Kinyuka)
- Tim-lö (Tamalu)
- Kè-è-rô (Perka, West Malacca)
- U-rèk-ka (Malacca)
- IAF Camp
- Sa-pë-ha (Kakana)
- Ratana
- Öt-ra-höön (Kimius)
- Aukchong
- Foul Point
- Ha-ran (Arong)
- Arong Beach
- Öt-ka-sip (Sawai)
- Rit-töp (Titop)
- Passa
- Töt-chak (Kinmai)

The names in brackets are often used for tourists and other outsiders, as the local names in Nicobarese are difficult for outsiders to pronounce.

Each village has a tuhet meaning "elderly heads", the number of which varies. From each of these elders three are elected as 1st, 2nd, and 3rd captain to look after the day-to-day affairs of the village.

According to the 2011 census of India, Car Nicobar Island has 4250 households. The effective literacy rate (i.e. the literacy rate of population excluding children aged 6 and below) is 100%.

Demographics (2011 Census)
	Total	Male	Female
Population	17841	9735	8106
Children aged below 6 years	1929	982	947
Scheduled caste	0	0	0
Scheduled tribe	15027	7659	7368
Literates	12627	7436	5191
Workers (all)	8844	5964	2880
Main workers (total)	3664	2916	748

== Administration ==
The island belongs to the township of Car Nicobar of Car Nicobar Taluk. of Nicobar District. District Administration is headed by Deputy Commissioner (Nicobar) while the Sub Division Car Nicobar is headed by an assistant commissioner.

== Image gallery ==
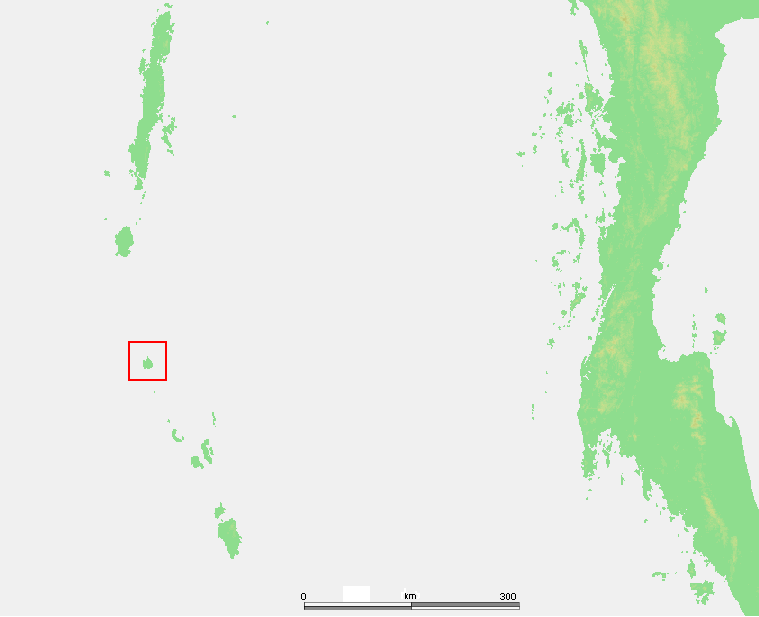
Location of Car Nicobar island

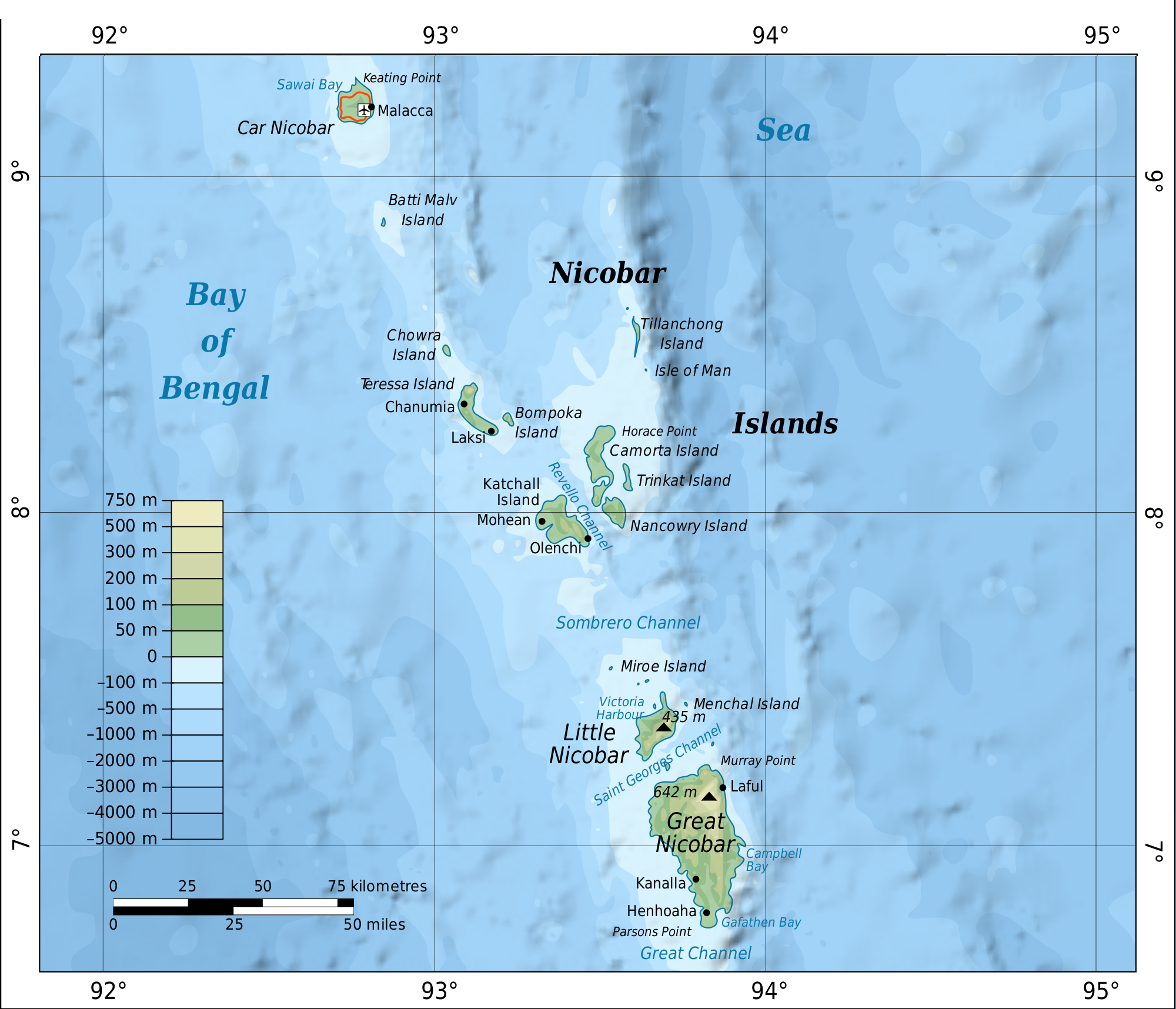
Map of the Nicobar Islands

== See also ==
- Car Nicobar Air Force Base
