= Kamorta Island =

Island in the Indian Ocean

- Location within Andaman and Nicobar Islands

Geography
- Location: Bay of Bengal
- Coordinates: 8.12°N 93.5°E
- Archipelago: Nicobar Islands
- Adjacent to: Indian Ocean
- Total islands: 1
- Major islands: Kamorta Island
- Area: 131 km^{2} (51 sq mi)
- Length: 25.5 km (15.84 mi)
- Width: 8 km (5 mi)
- Coastline: 108 km (67.1 mi)
- Highest elevation: 186 m (610 ft)
- Highest point

Administration
- India
- District: Nicobar
- Island group: Nicobar Islands
- Subdivisions of India: Nancowry Subdivision
- Taluk: Nancowry
- Largest settlement: Kamorta (pop. 1870)

Demographics
- Population: 3688 (2011)
- Pop. density: 28/km^{2} (73/sq mi)
- Ethnic groups: Hindu, Nicobarese

Additional information
- Time zone: IST (UTC+5:30)
- PIN: 744301
- Telephone code: 03192
- ISO code: IN-AN-00
- Official website: www.and.nic.in
- Literacy: 84.4%
- Avg. summer temperature: 32.0 °C (89.6 °F)
- Avg. winter temperature: 28.0 °C (82.4 °F)
- Sex ratio: ♂/♀
- Census Code: 35.638.0002
- Official Languages: Hindi, English, Tamil; Camorta (regional)

Kamorta Island is an island in the Nicobar Islands chain of India, located in the northeast Indian Ocean between the Bay of Bengal and the Andaman Sea.

== Facilities ==
INS Kardip is a naval forward operating base of the joint-services Andaman and Nicobar Command on Kamorta island. The Indian Navy's Kamorta-class Corvette is named after the island.

== Demographics ==
Kalatapu is the main village on this island. According to the 2011 census of India, The Island has 915 households. List of villages from north to south and population:

- Kakana, Nancowry, 265, 8.187°N 93.513°E
- Kakana South, 5, 8.168°N 93.502°E
- Neeche Tapu, 2, 8.181°N 93.476°E
- Pilpilow, 280, 8.172°N 93.481°E
- Vikas Nagar, 235, 8.119°N 93.516°E
- Karan, 5, 8.11°N 93.493°E
- Daring, 110, 8.105°N 93.492°E
- Maru, 0, 8.09°N 93.533°E
- Chanol, 13, 8.068°N 93.496°E
- Berainak, 188, 8.073°N 93.547°E
- Chota Inak, 239, 8.066°N 93.542°E
- Sanuh, 15, 8.054°N 93.537°E
- Banderkari, 23, 8.051°N 93.531°E
- Kalatapu, 1870, 8.037°N 93.545°E
- Ramzoo, 98, 8.055°N 93.508°E
- Tomae, 10, 8.042°N 93.49°E
- Changua, 136, 8.021°N 93.487°E
- Munak, 117, 8.01°N 93.505°E
- Payuha, 24, 8.006°N 93.506°E
- Knot, 9, 8.00°N 93.505°E
- Alukian, 46, 8.006°N 93.493°E

== Administration ==
The island belongs to the township of Nancowry.

== Image gallery ==
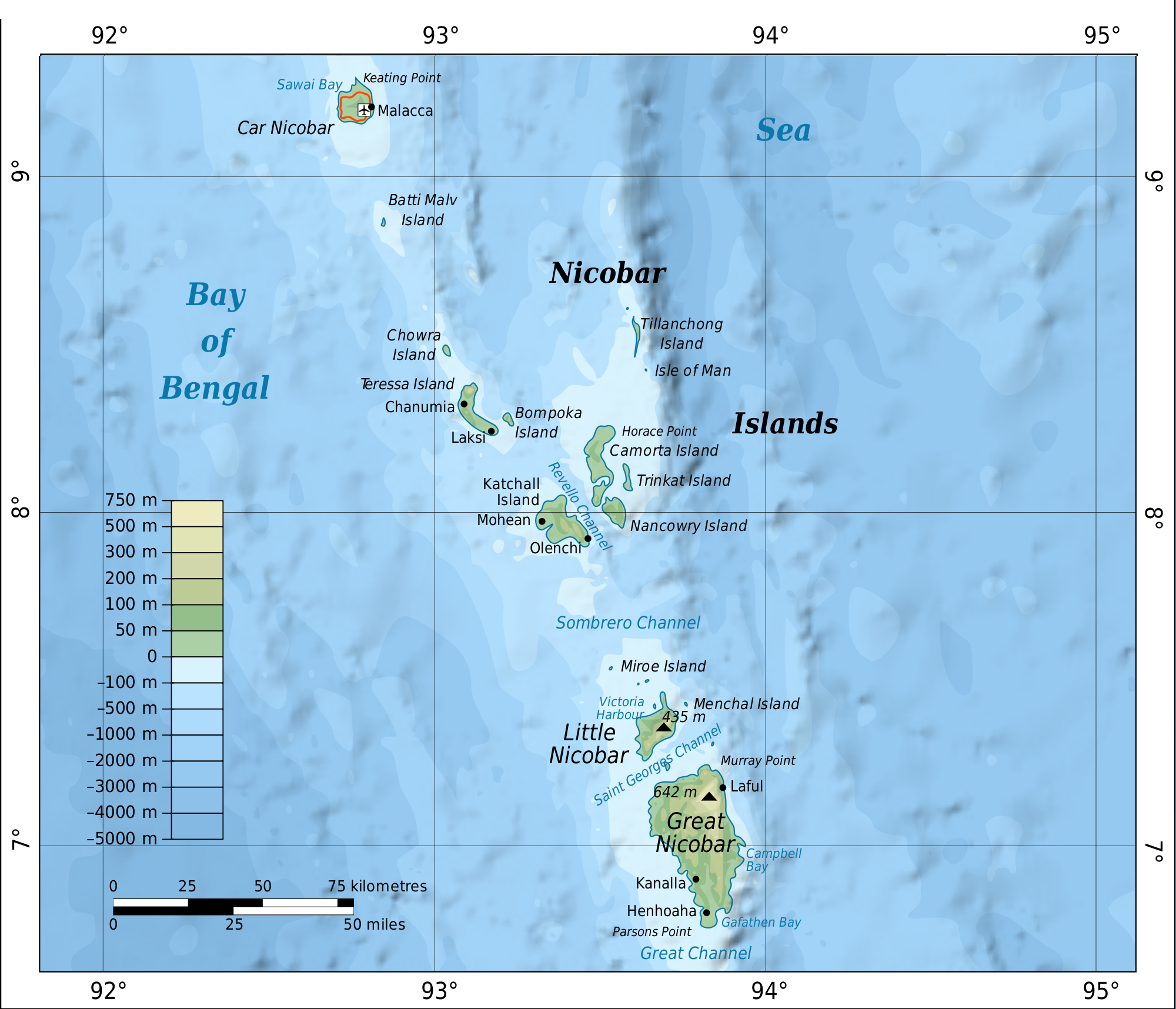
Map of the Nicobar Islands
