= Trinket Island =

Island in the Indian Ocean

- Location within Andaman and Nicobar Islands Location within Bay of Bengal

Geography
- Location: Bay of Bengal
- Coordinates: 8.08°N 93.58°E
- Archipelago: Nicobar Islands
- Adjacent to: Indian Ocean
- Total islands: 2
- Major islands: Trinket
- Area: 12.25 km^{2} (4.73 sq mi)
- Length: 9.6 km (5.97 mi)
- Width: 2.2 km (1.37 mi)
- Coastline: 35.2 km (21.87 mi)
- Highest elevation: 10 m (30 ft)

Administration
- India
- District: Nicobar
- Island group: Nicobar Islands
- Subdivisions of India: Nancowry Subdivision
- Taluk: Kamorta tehsil
- Largest settlement: Trinket (pop. 2)

Demographics
- Population: 2 (2016)
- Pop. density: 0.16/km^{2} (0.41/sq mi)
- Ethnic groups: Hindu, Nicobarese

Additional information
- Time zone: IST (UTC+5:30)
- PIN: 744301
- Telephone code: 03192
- ISO code: IN-AN-00
- Official website: www.and.nic.in
- Literacy: 84.4%
- Avg. summer temperature: 32.0 °C (89.6 °F)
- Avg. winter temperature: 28.0 °C (82.4 °F)
- Sex ratio: ♂/♀
- Census Code: 35.638.0002
- Official Languages: Hindi, English, Tamil; Katchal (regional)

Trinket Island (sometimes spelled Trinkat or Trinkut) is one of the 24 islands that make up the Nicobar Islands chain, located in the northeast Indian Ocean between the Bay of Bengal and the Andaman Sea. It is located east of Kamorta Island.

== Geography ==
Trinket has an area of 12.25 km², and a flat, low topography. Regional monsoons bring annual rainfall of 3,000 mm to 3,800 mm.

The island is surrounded by shallow waters and coral reefs, which allow it to be approached by boat only during high tide.

== Administration ==
From 1869 until 1947 Trinket was part of Britain's Indian colonies. In 1947 it became part of the Dominion of India, and since 1950 of the Republic of India. Trinket is part of the Kamorta tehsil, Nancowry subdivision of the Nicobar District, and part of the Andaman & Nicobar Islands state.

Since 1956 the Government of India has afforded protection to the native Nicobarese through a special legislation, the Andaman and Nicobar Protection of Aboriginal Tribes Regulation, which regulated entry to the islands.

== Demographics ==
Two early censuses of the island were conducted by the British administration in 1883 and 1901. The 1883 census revealed a population of 85 persons living in eight villages. The 1901 census indicated an estimated population of 102 persons, spread between four and six villages, ruled by two chiefs.

As of 2001, the Indian census had catalogued 436 persons living on Trinket in four villages: Trinket (population 244), Safebalu (pop. 127), Tapiang (pop. 42) and Hockcook (pop. 23). Like most other islands in the Nicobar district, Trinket's population was almost exclusively ethnic Nicobarese.

Although, the 2011 Census of India indicated that the island had become uninhabited following the 2004 tsunami disaster, as of the end of 2012 the island appeared to have been repopulated by a pair of returnees, living at the site of what had been Trinket village. By 2020 the population of returnees was reported to amount to a total of seven families.

== Economy ==
From the fifteenth to the nineteenth centuries, trade with Trinket, as with the rest of the Nicobar Islands, was dominated by Indian, Arab, and European merchant fleets.

Prior to the 2004 Indian Ocean earthquake, the island's populace was dependent on the outside world for many goods, including foodstuffs. Until the 1950s they exported whole coconuts and other forest products, but after the 1950s local production shifted toward exports of processed coconut, in the form of copra. Those products were traded for imports such as rice, sugar, and clothes, which were used to supplement the local subsistence economy based on hunting and gathering, fishing, pig and chicken rearing, and household gardens.

== History ==
Trinket was officially made subject to the British Empire in 1869. The island became part of sovereign India following Indian independence in 1947.

=== Effects of 2004 earthquake and tsunami ===
==== Physical effects ====
Like the other Nicobar and Andaman Islands, Trinket was devastated by tsunamis generated by the 2004 Indian Ocean earthquake. The island, which has a low and flat topography, was severely affected by the powerful waves and by earthquake-caused subduction of 1.5m to 1.75 m (4 ft 11 in to 5 ft 9 in), suffering a reduction of its surface area from 14.6 km² down to 12.25 km². Initial reports that the island had been split apart were later confirmed by satellite imagery and onsite surveys.

==== Human toll ====
On Trinket, the tsunami left 91 dead or disappeared and the total devastation of the island's communities and economy. Shortly after the disaster, the entire remaining population of the island was evacuated to neighboring islands, principally Nancowry, and Kamorta, where the Indian government built a resettlement village called Vikas Nagar.

=== Repopulation of the island ===
By the end of 2012, only two people, both returnees, were reported to be living permanently on the island. A few more refugees have returned as of 2017, amounting to a total of seven families as of 2020.

== Image gallery ==
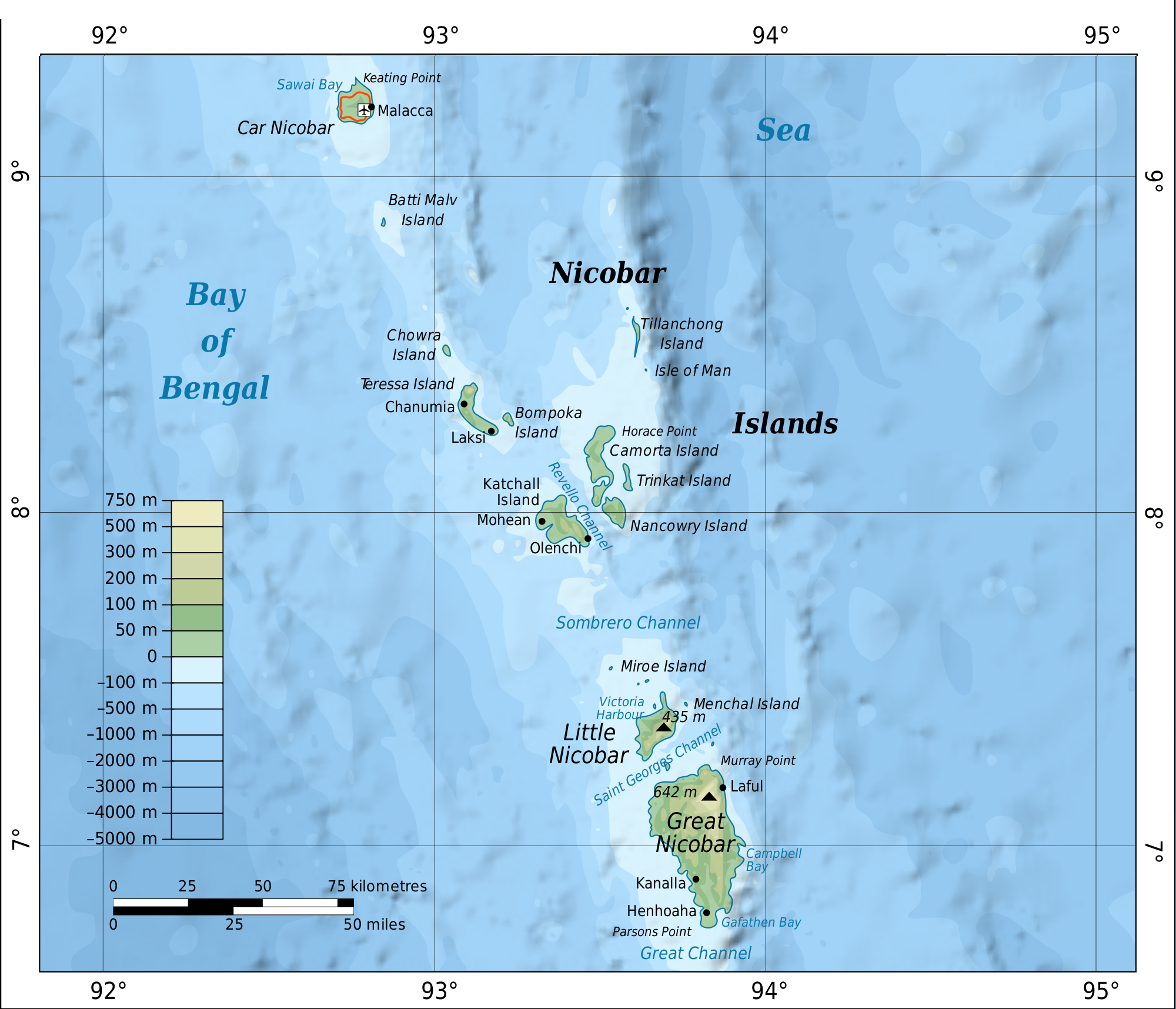
Map
