= Pulobha =

Pulobha Pulobahan / Pathathifen / Pulobhabi
- village
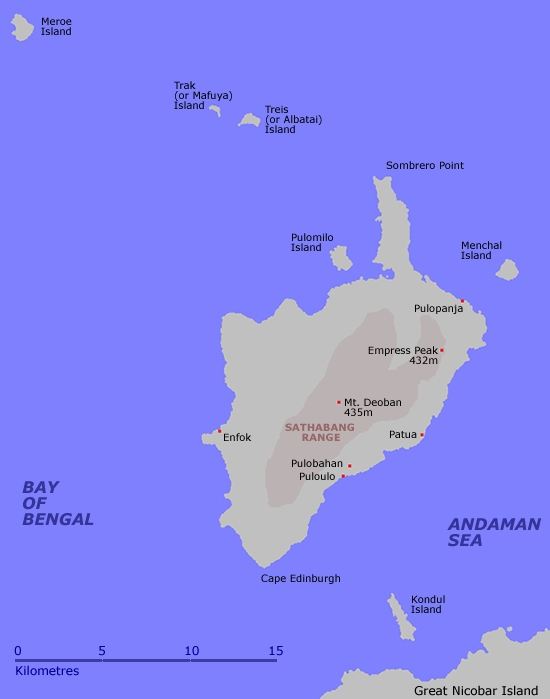
- Pulobha or Pulobahan is located in south-western region of the Little Nicobar Island

- Location in India
- Coordinates: 7.315461°N 93.718953°E
- Country: India
- State: Andaman and Nicobar Islands
- District: Nicobar
- Tehsil: Great Nicobar

Population (2011)
  - Total: 52
- Time zone: UTC+5:30 (IST)
- Census code: 645153

Pulobha is a village in the Nicobar district of Andaman and Nicobar Islands, India. It is located on the Little Nicobar Island, and is administered as part of the Great Nicobar tehsil.

== Demographics ==
The village was severely affected by the 2004 Indian Ocean earthquake and tsunami, and a number of its Shompen residents went missing. According to the 2011 census of India, Pulobha had only 6 households with 52 people. The effective literacy rate (i.e. the literacy rate of population excluding children aged 6 and below) is 44.74%.

Demographics (2011 Census)
	Total	Male	Female
Population	52	21	31
Children aged below 6 years	14	7	7
Scheduled caste	0	0	0
Scheduled tribe	52	21	31
Literates	17	9	8
Workers (all)	0	0	0
Main workers (total)	0	0	0
Main workers: Cultivators	0	0	0
Main workers: Agricultural labourers	0	0	0
Main workers: Household industry workers	0	0	0
Main workers: Other	0	0	0
Marginal workers (total)	0	0	0
Marginal workers: Cultivators	0	0	0
Marginal workers: Agricultural labourers	0	0	0
Marginal workers: Household industry workers	0	0	0
Marginal workers: Others	0	0	0
Non-workers	52	21	31
