= Chongkamong =

- village
- Country: India
- State: Andaman and Nicobar Islands
- District: Nicobar
- Tehsil: Nancowry

Population (2011)
  - Total: 150
- Time zone: UTC+5:30 (IST)
- Census code: 645029

Chongkamong is a village in the Nicobar district of Andaman and Nicobar Islands, India. It is located in the Nancowry tehsil, on the Chowra island.

== Demographics ==
According to the 2011 census of India, Chongkamong has 38 households. The effective literacy rate (i.e. the literacy rate of population excluding children aged 6 and below) is 60%.

Demographics (2011 Census)
	Total	Male	Female
Population	150	89	61
Children aged below 6 years	20	9	11
Scheduled caste	0	0	0
Scheduled tribe	121	60	61
Literates	78	55	23
Workers (all)	68	65	3
Main workers (total)	35	35	0
Main workers: Cultivators	0	0	0
Main workers: Agricultural labourers	0	0	0
Main workers: Household industry workers	0	0	0
Main workers: Other	35	35	0
Marginal workers (total)	33	30	3
Marginal workers: Cultivators	0	0	0
Marginal workers: Agricultural labourers	0	0	0
Marginal workers: Household industry workers	0	0	0
Marginal workers: Others	33	30	3
Non-workers	82	24	58
