= Chukmachi =

- village
- Location in Andaman and Nicobar Islands, India Chukmachi (India)
- Coordinates: 8.232372°N 93.165812°E
- Country: India
- State: Andaman and Nicobar Islands
- District: Nicobar
- Tehsil: Nancowry

Population (2011)
  - Total: 237
- Time zone: UTC+5:30 (IST)
- Census code: 645039

Chukmachi is a village in the Nicobar district of Andaman and Nicobar Islands, India. It is located in the Nancowry tehsil.

== Demographics ==
According to the 2011 census of India, Chukmachi has 69 households. The effective literacy rate (i.e. the literacy rate of population excluding children aged 6 and below) is 63.02%.

Demographics (2011 Census)
	Total	Male	Female
Population	237	144	93
Children aged below 6 years	45	23	22
Scheduled caste	0	0	0
Scheduled tribe	227	134	93
Literates	121	87	34
Workers (all)	77	76	1
Main workers (total)	13	13	0
Main workers: Cultivators	0	0	0
Main workers: Agricultural labourers	1	1	0
Main workers: Household industry workers	0	0	0
Main workers: Other	12	12	0
Marginal workers (total)	64	63	1
Marginal workers: Cultivators	0	0	0
Marginal workers: Agricultural labourers	0	0	0
Marginal workers: Household industry workers	0	0	0
Marginal workers: Others	64	63	1
Non-workers	160	68	92
