= Hinnunga =

- village
- Country: India
- State: Andaman and Nicobar Islands
- District: Nicobar
- Tehsil: Nancowry

Population (2011)
  - Total: 124
- Time zone: UTC+5:30 (IST)
- Census code: 645097

Hinnunga is a village in the Nicobar district of Andaman and Nicobar Islands, India. It is located in the Nancowry tehsil.

== Demographics ==
According to the 2011 census of India, Hinnunga has 31 households. The effective literacy rate (i.e. the literacy rate of population excluding children aged 6 and below) is 85.71%.

Demographics (2011 Census)
	Total	Male	Female
Population	124	64	60
Children aged below 6 years	19	10	9
Scheduled caste	0	0	0
Scheduled tribe	118	60	58
Literates	90	49	41
Workers (all)	38	27	11
Main workers (total)	11	6	5
Main workers: Cultivators	0	0	0
Main workers: Agricultural labourers	0	0	0
Main workers: Household industry workers	0	0	0
Main workers: Other	11	6	5
Marginal workers (total)	27	21	6
Marginal workers: Cultivators	0	0	0
Marginal workers: Agricultural labourers	0	0	0
Marginal workers: Household industry workers	0	0	0
Marginal workers: Others	27	21	6
Non-workers	86	37	49
