= Kanahinot =

- village
- Country: India
- State: Andaman and Nicobar Islands
- District: Nicobar
- Tehsil: Nancowry

Population (2011)
  - Total: 60
- Time zone: UTC+5:30 (IST)
- Census code: 645042

Kanahinot is a village in the Nicobar district of Andaman and Nicobar Islands, India. It is located in the Nancowry tehsil.

== Demographics ==
According to the 2011 census of India, Kanahinot has 15 households. The effective literacy rate (i.e. the literacy rate of population excluding children aged 6 and below) is 59.62%.

Demographics (2011 Census)
	Total	Male	Female
Population	60	35	25
Children aged below 6 years	8	4	4
Scheduled caste	0	0	0
Scheduled tribe	60	35	25
Literates	31	21	10
Workers (all)	16	15	1
Main workers (total)	3	2	1
Main workers: Cultivators	0	0	0
Main workers: Agricultural labourers	0	0	0
Main workers: Household industry workers	0	0	0
Main workers: Other	3	2	1
Marginal workers (total)	13	13	0
Marginal workers: Cultivators	0	0	0
Marginal workers: Agricultural labourers	0	0	0
Marginal workers: Household industry workers	0	0	0
Marginal workers: Others	13	13	0
Non-workers	44	20	24
