= Tahaila =

Tahaila Tahaeela
- village
- Location in Andaman and Nicobar Islands, India Tahaila (India)
- Coordinates: 8.462°N 93.052°E
- Country: India
- State: Andaman and Nicobar Islands
- District: Nicobar
- Tehsil: Nancowry

Population (2016)
  - Total: 10
- Time zone: UTC+5:30 (IST)
- Census code: 645028

Tahaila is a village in the Nicobar district of Andaman and Nicobar Islands, India. It is located in the Nancowry tehsil, on the Chowra island.

== Demographics ==
According to the 2011 census of India, Tahaila has 119 households. The effective literacy rate (i.e. the literacy rate of population excluding children aged 6 and below) is 47.69%.

Demographics (2011 Census)
	Total	Male	Female
Population	377	189	188
Children aged below 6 years	52	24	28
Scheduled caste	0	0	0
Scheduled tribe	371	185	186
Literates	155	97	58
Workers (all)	116	103	13
Main workers (total)	17	14	3
Main workers: Cultivators	0	0	0
Main workers: Agricultural labourers	0	0	0
Main workers: Household industry workers	0	0	0
Main workers: Other	17	14	3
Marginal workers (total)	99	89	10
Marginal workers: Cultivators	0	0	0
Marginal workers: Agricultural labourers	0	0	0
Marginal workers: Household industry workers	0	0	0
Marginal workers: Others	99	89	10
Non-workers	261	86	175
