= Raihion =

- village
- Location in Andaman and Nicobar Islands, India Raihion (India)
- Coordinates: 8.455052°N 93.045210°E
- Country: India
- State: Andaman and Nicobar Islands
- District: Nicobar
- Tehsil: Nancowry

Population (2011)
  - Total: 276
- Time zone: UTC+5:30 (IST)
- Census code: 645032

Raihion is a village in the Nicobar district of Andaman and Nicobar Islands, India. It is located in the Nancowry tehsil on the Chowra (a.k.a. Sanenyo) island.

== Demographics ==
According to the 2011 census of India, Raihion has 74 households. The effective literacy rate (i.e. the literacy rate of population excluding children aged 6 and below) is 46.12%.

Demographics (2011 Census)
	Total	Male	Female
Population	276	150	126
Children aged below 6 years	44	29	15
Scheduled caste	0	0	0
Scheduled tribe	263	138	125
Literates	107	65	42
Workers (all)	61	61	0
Main workers (total)	17	17	0
Main workers: Cultivators	0	0	0
Main workers: Agricultural labourers	0	0	0
Main workers: Household industry workers	0	0	0
Main workers: Other	17	17	0
Marginal workers (total)	44	44	0
Marginal workers: Cultivators	0	0	0
Marginal workers: Agricultural labourers	0	0	0
Marginal workers: Household industry workers	0	0	0
Marginal workers: Others	44	44	0
Non-workers	215	89	126
