= Inroak Chinlak =

Inroak / Chinlak
- village
- Location in Andaman and Nicobar Islands, India Inroak / Chinlak (India)
- Coordinates: 7.984206°N 93.555503°E
- Country: India
- State: Andaman and Nicobar Islands
- District: Nicobar
- Tehsil: Nancowry

Population (2011)
  - Total: 1
- Time zone: UTC+5:30 (IST)
- Census code: 645099

Inroak / Chinlak is a village in the Nicobar district of Andaman and Nicobar Islands, India. Among the least populated villages in India, it is located in the Nancowry tehsil. It comes under the administration of Nancowry Tribal Council.

== Demographics ==
According to the 2011 census of India, Inroak / Chinlak has only 1 household with 1 person. The only resident is literate, which makes the village's literacy rate 100%.

Demographics (2011 Census)
	Total	Male	Female
Population	1	1	0
Children aged below 6 years	0	0	0
Scheduled caste	0	0	0
Scheduled tribe	1	1	0
Literates	1	1	0
Workers (all)	1	1	0
Main workers (total)	0	0	0
Main workers: Cultivators	0	0	0
Main workers: Agricultural labourers	0	0	0
Main workers: Household industry workers	0	0	0
Main workers: Other	0	0	0
Marginal workers (total)	1	1	0
Marginal workers: Cultivators	0	0	0
Marginal workers: Agricultural labourers	0	0	0
Marginal workers: Household industry workers	0	0	0
Marginal workers: Others	1	1	0
Non-workers	0	0	0
