= Trinket =

A trinket may refer to:

- A small showy piece of jewellery, such as a jewel, bracelet, necklace or a ring.
- Trinket Island, an island of the Nicobar Islands
  - Trinket Bay, a village on the island
- Trinket snake, common name for Elaphe helena, a species of colubrid snake
- The original name of New Zealand rock band The Datsuns
- A troll girl in the comic series Elfquest
- A character in the American animated television series Pepper Ann
- The English localized name of Wei Xiaobao in John Minford's translation of Louis Cha's novel The Deer and the Cauldron
- A small biscuit
- Trinkets (TV series)

== See also ==
- Basque trinquete, a type of pelota court
