= Hintona =

- village
- Location in Andaman and Nicobar Islands, India Hintona (India)
- Coordinates: 7.9116968°N 93.3964005°E
- Country: India
- State: Andaman and Nicobar Islands
- District: Nicobar
- Tehsil: Nancowry
- Elevation: 73 m (240 ft)

Population (2011)
  - Total: 21
- Time zone: UTC+5:30 (IST)
- 2011 census code: 645102

Hintona is a village in the Nicobar district of Andaman and Nicobar Islands, India. It is located in the Nancowry tehsil.

== Demographics ==
According to the 2011 census of India, Hintona has 5 households. The effective literacy rate (i.e. the literacy rate of population excluding children aged 6 and below) is 66.67%. The village is inhabited by ethnic Nicobarese people.

Demographics (2011 Census)
| | Total | Male | Female |
|---|---|---|---|
| Population | 21 | 9 | 12 |
| Children aged below 6 years | 3 | 1 | 2 |
| Scheduled caste | 0 | 0 | 0 |
| Scheduled tribe | 21 | 9 | 12 |
| Literates | 12 | 7 | 5 |
| Workers (all) | 9 | 4 | 5 |
| Main workers (total) | 0 | 0 | 0 |
| Main workers: Cultivators | 0 | 0 | 0 |
| Main workers: Agricultural labourers | 0 | 0 | 0 |
| Main workers: Household industry workers | 0 | 0 | 0 |
| Main workers: Other | 0 | 0 | 0 |
| Marginal workers (total) | 9 | 4 | 5 |
| Marginal workers: Cultivators | 0 | 0 | 0 |
| Marginal workers: Agricultural labourers | 0 | 0 | 0 |
| Marginal workers: Household industry workers | 0 | 0 | 0 |
| Marginal workers: Others | 9 | 4 | 5 |
| Non-workers | 12 | 5 | 7 |
