= Kokeon =

- village
- Location in Andaman and Nicobar Islands, India Kokeon (India)
- Coordinates: 6.8682752°N 93.8366013°E
- Country: India
- State: Andaman and Nicobar Islands
- District: Nicobar
- Tehsil: Great Nicobar
- Elevation: 24 m (79 ft)

Population (2011)
  - Total: 20
- Time zone: UTC+5:30 (IST)
- 2011 census code: 645183

Kokeon is a village in the Nicobar district of Andaman and Nicobar Islands, India. It is located in the Great Nicobar tehsil.

== Demographics ==
The village was severely affected by the 2004 Indian Ocean earthquake and tsunami. A team of researchers who visited the village in February 2005, found only abandoned huts of the village's former Shompen inhabitants. According to the 2011 census of India, Kokeon has only 6 households left. The literacy rate of the village is 0.

Demographics (2011 Census)
	Total	Male	Female
Population	20	13	7
Children aged below 6 years	2	1	1
Scheduled caste	0	0	0
Scheduled tribe	20	13	7
Literates	0	0	0
Workers (all)	0	0	0
Non-workers	20	13	7
