= Altheak =

Altheak Althakek
- village
- Country: India
- State: Andaman and Nicobar Islands
- District: Nicobar
- Tehsil: Nancowry

Population (2011)
  - Total: 30
- Time zone: UTC+5:30 (IST)
- Census code: 645093

Altheak is a village in the Nicobar district of Andaman and Nicobar Islands, India. It is located in the Nancowry tehsil.

== Demographics ==
According to the 2011 census of India, Altheak has 8 households. The effective literacy rate (i.e. the literacy rate of population excluding children aged 6 and below) is 78.26%.

Demographics (2011 Census)
	Total	Male	Female
Population	30	16	14
Children aged below 6 years	7	2	5
Scheduled caste	0	0	0
Scheduled tribe	29	15	14
Literates	18	13	5
Workers (all)	17	12	5
Main workers (total)	1	1	0
Main workers: Cultivators	0	0	0
Main workers: Agricultural labourers	0	0	0
Main workers: Menage industry workers	0	0	0
Main workers: Other	1	1	0
Marginal workers (total)	16	11	5
Marginal workers: Cultivators	1	0	1
Marginal workers: Farming labourers	0	0	0
Marginal workers: Household industry workers	0	0	0
Fringy workers: Others	15	11	4
Non-workers	13	4	9
