= Champin =

- village
- Location in Andaman and Nicobar Islands, India Champin (India)
- Coordinates: 8.023611°N 93.549167°E
- Country: India
- State: Andaman and Nicobar Islands
- District: Nicobar
- Tehsil: Nancowry

Population (2011)
  - Total: 143
- Time zone: UTC+5:30 (IST)
- Census code: 645096

Champin is a village in the Nicobar district of Andaman and Nicobar Islands, India. It is located on the Nancowry Island, around 10 km from the Tapong village, and comes under the administration of the Nancowry tehsil.

== History ==
During the British Raj, the British Indian government bestowed the title of "Rani" ("Queen") on a local woman named Islon, for the services rendered by her to the government. Even after India became independent in 1947, Islon and her only daughter Lachmi were treated as queens by the local villagers, although the government did not recognize them as such. After Lachmi's death in 1989, her only daughter Fathima became the village leader. She had eight children, including five daughters and three sons; her family of 42 lived in three buildings, locally known as Rani Ghat ("Queen's Palace"). After the village was devastated by the 2004 Indian Ocean earthquake and tsunami, 72-year old Fathima and her family were evacuated by the Indian authorities to Port Blair. The tsunami caused two deaths in the village, that of a local woman named Jennifer, and of a man who was a resident of the neighbouring Katchal Island. The villagers decided to select an elevated land to rebuild their village.

== Demographics ==
A census taken by a research team after the 2004 tsunami recorded a population of 510 in Champin.

The village's population reduced considerably over the next few years. According to the 2011 census of India, Champin has 33 households. The effective literacy rate (i.e. the literacy rate of population excluding children aged 6 and below) is 86.99%.

Demographics (2011 Census)
	Total	Male	Female
Population	143	72	71
Children aged below 6 years	20	11	9
Scheduled caste	0	0	0
Scheduled tribe	143	72	71
Literates	107	58	49
Workers (all)	32	23	9
Main workers (total)	18	12	6
Main workers: Cultivators	1	1	0
Main workers: Agricultural labourers	0	0	0
Main workers: Household industry workers	0	0	0
Main workers: Other	17	11	6
Marginal workers (total)	14	11	3
Marginal workers: Cultivators	0	0	0
Marginal workers: Agricultural labourers	0	0	0
Marginal workers: Household industry workers	0	0	0
Marginal workers: Others	14	11	3
Non-workers	111	49	62
