= Balu Basti =

Coordinates: 11.6230669136°N 92.711424528°E

Balu Basti Al-Hit-Touch
- village
- Location in Andaman and Nicobar Islands, India Balu Basti (India)
- Country: India
- State: Andaman and Nicobar Islands
- District: Nicobar
- Tehsil: Nancowry

Population (2011)
  - Total: 91
- Time zone: UTC+5:30 (IST)
- Census code: 645094

Al-Hit-Touch/Balu Basti is a village in the Nicobar district of Andaman and Nicobar Islands, India. It is located in the Nancowry tehsil.

== Demographics ==
The village was affected by the 2004 Indian Ocean earthquake and tsunami. According to the 2011 census of India, Al-Hit-Touch/Balu Basti has 22 households. The effective literacy rate (i.e. the literacy rate of population excluding children aged 6 and below) is 94.37%.

Demographics (2011 Census)
	Total	Male	Female
Population	91	48	43
Children aged below 6 years	20	8	12
Scheduled caste	0	0	0
Scheduled tribe	90	47	43
Literates	67	39	28
Workers (all)	22	15	7
Main workers (total)	16	10	6
Main workers: Cultivators	0	0	0
Main workers: Agricultural labourers	0	0	0
Main workers: Household industry workers	0	0	0
Main workers: Other	16	10	6
Marginal workers (total)	6	5	1
Marginal workers: Cultivators	0	0	0
Marginal workers: Agricultural labourers	0	0	0
Marginal workers: Household industry workers	0	0	0
Marginal workers: Others	6	5	1
Non-workers	69	33	36
