= Kuitasuk =

- village
- Country: India
- State: Andaman and Nicobar Islands
- District: Nicobar
- Tehsil: Nancowry

Population (2011)
  - Total: 277
- Time zone: UTC+5:30 (IST)
- Census code: 645031

Kuitasuk is a village in the Nicobar district of Andaman and Nicobar Islands, India. It is located in the Nancowry tehsil, on the Chowra island.

== Demographics ==
According to the 2011 census of India, Kuitasuk has 77 households. The effective literacy rate (i.e. the literacy rate of population excluding children aged 6 and below) is 42.06%.

Demographics (2011 Census)
	Total	Male	Female
Population	277	136	141
Children aged below 6 years	44	24	20
Scheduled caste	0	0	0
Scheduled tribe	277	136	141
Literates	98	51	47
Workers (all)	37	31	6
Main workers (total)	10	6	4
Main workers: Cultivators	0	0	0
Main workers: Agricultural labourers	0	0	0
Main workers: Household industry workers	0	0	0
Main workers: Other	10	6	4
Marginal workers (total)	27	25	2
Marginal workers: Cultivators	0	0	0
Marginal workers: Agricultural labourers	0	0	0
Marginal workers: Household industry workers	0	0	0
Marginal workers: Others	27	25	2
Non-workers	240	105	135
