= Aloorang =

Aloorang Alurang
- village
- Location in Andaman and Nicobar Islands, India Aloorang (India)
- Coordinates: 8.339083°N 93.105907°E
- Country: India
- State: Andaman and Nicobar Islands
- District: Nicobar
- Tehsil: Nancowry

Population (2011)
  - Total: 271
- Time zone: UTC+5:30 (IST)
- Census code: 645034

Aloorang is a village in the Nicobar district of Andaman and Nicobar Islands, India. It is located in the Nancowry tehsil.

== Demographics ==
According to the 2011 census of India, Aloorang has 68 households. The effective literacy rate (i.e. the literacy rate of population excluding children aged 6 and below) is 53.02%.

Demographics (2011 Census)
| | Total | Male | Female |
|---|---|---|---|
| Population | 271 | 126 | 145 |
| Children aged below 6 years | 39 | 18 | 21 |
| Scheduled caste | 0 | 0 | 0 |
| Scheduled tribe | 270 | 125 | 145 |
| Literates | 123 | 67 | 56 |
| Workers (all) | 84 | 70 | 14 |
| Main workers (total) | 15 | 11 | 4 |
| Main workers: Cultivators | 0 | 0 | 0 |
| Main workers: Agricultural labourers | 0 | 0 | 0 |
| Main workers: Household industry workers | 0 | 0 | 0 |
| Main workers: Other | 15 | 11 | 4 |
| Marginal workers (total) | 69 | 59 | 10 |
| Marginal workers: Cultivators | 0 | 0 | 0 |
| Marginal workers: Agricultural labourers | 1 | 1 | 0 |
| Marginal workers: Household industry workers | 3 | 3 | 0 |
| Marginal workers: Others | 65 | 55 | 10 |
| Non-workers | 187 | 56 | 131 |
