= Nicobar =

Nicobar can refer to:

- Nicobar Islands, a group of islands within the Indian union territory of Andaman and Nicobar Islands
  - Car Nicobar
  - Great Nicobar Island
  - Little Nicobar
- Nicobar district, a district of the Indian union territory
- Nicobar, a ship of the Danish Asiatic Company

== Animals ==
- Nicobar shrew
- Nicobar treeshrew
- Nicobar long-tailed macaque
- Nicobar flying fox
- Nicobar pigeon
- Nicobar megapode
- Nicobar sparrowhawk
- Nicobar parakeet
- Nicobar bulbul
- Central Nicobar serpent eagle
- South Nicobar serpent eagle
- Nicobar scops-owl
- Nicobar crow

== See also ==
- Nicobarese (disambiguation)
- Car Nicobar (disambiguation)
