= Tapong =

Tapong Tapong incl. Kabila
- village
- Country: India
- State: Andaman and Nicobar Islands
- District: Nicobar
- Tehsil: Nancowry

Population (2011)
  - Total: 270
- Time zone: UTC+5:30 (IST)
- Census code: 645091

Tapong is a village in the Nicobar district of Andaman and Nicobar Islands, India. It is located on the Nancowry Island, around 10 km from the Champin village, and comes under the administration of the Nancowry tehsil.

== Demographics ==
A census taken by a research team after the 2004 Indian Ocean tsunami recorded a population of 296 in Tapong: the tsunami did not cause any deaths in the village.

The 2011 census of India recorded the population of Tapong (including Kabila settlement) as 270, and the number of households as 62. The effective literacy rate (i.e. the literacy rate of population excluding children aged 6 and below) was 83.41%.

Demographics (2011 Census)
	Total	Male	Female
Population	270	135	135
Children aged below 6 years	53	24	29
Scheduled caste	0	0	0
Scheduled tribe	270	135	135
Literates	181	103	78
Workers (all)	149	80	69
Main workers (total)	9	5	4
Main workers: Cultivators	0	0	0
Main workers: Agricultural labourers	0	0	0
Main workers: Household industry workers	0	0	0
Main workers: Other	9	5	4
Marginal workers (total)	140	75	65
Marginal workers: Cultivators	0	0	0
Marginal workers: Agricultural labourers	0	0	0
Marginal workers: Household industry workers	0	0	0
Marginal workers: Others	140	75	65
Non-workers	121	55	66
