= Alhiat =

Alhiat Oil Heat
- village
- Country: India
- State: Andaman and Nicobar Islands
- District: Nicobar
- Tehsil: Nancowry

Population (2011)
  - Total: 190
- Time zone: UTC+5:30 (IST)
- Census code: 645030

Alhiat is a village in the Nicobar district of Andaman and Nicobar Islands, India. It is located in the Nancowry tehsil, on the Chowra island.

== Demographics ==
According to the 2011 census of India, Alhiat has 59 households. The effective literacy rate (i.e. the literacy rate of population excluding children aged 6 and below) is 55%.

Demographics (2011 Census)
	Total	Male	Female
Population	190	92	98
Children aged below 6 years	30	17	13
Scheduled caste	0	0	0
Scheduled tribe	189	91	98
Literates	88	47	41
Workers (all)	56	54	2
Main workers (total)	10	8	2
Main workers: Cultivators	0	0	0
Main workers: Agricultural labourers	0	0	0
Main workers: Household industry workers	0	0	0
Main workers: Other	10	8	2
Marginal workers (total)	46	46	0
Marginal workers: Cultivators	0	0	0
Marginal workers: Agricultural labourers	0	0	0
Marginal workers: Household industry workers	0	0	0
Marginal workers: Others	46	46	0
Non-workers	134	38	96
