= Alukian =

Alukian Alhukheck
- village
- Location in Andaman and Nicobar Islands, India Alukian (Bay of Bengal)
- Coordinates: 8.006°N 93.493°E
- Country: India
- State: Andaman and Nicobar Islands
- District: Nicobar
- Tehsil: Nancowry

Population (2011)
  - Total: 46
- Time zone: UTC+5:30 (IST)
- 2011 census code: 645121

The Alukian or Alhukheck is a village in the Nicobar district of Andaman and Nicobar Islands, India. It is located in the Nancowry tehsil, on the Kamorta Island.

== Demographics ==
According to the 2011 census of India, the Alukian has 10 households. The effective literacy rate (i.e. the literacy rate of population excluding children aged 6 and below) is 62.16%.

Demographics (2011 Census)
	Total	Male	Female
Population	46	25	21
Children aged below 6 years	9	5	4
Scheduled caste	0	0	0
Scheduled tribe	46	25	21
Literates	23	14	9
Workers (all)	19	14	5
Main workers (total)	18	14	4
Main workers: Cultivators	0	0	0
Main workers: Agricultural labourers	0	0	0
Main workers: Household industry workers	0	0	0
Main workers: Other	18	14	4
Marginal workers (total)	1	0	1
Marginal workers: Cultivators	1	0	1
Marginal workers: Agricultural labourers	0	0	0
Marginal workers: Household industry workers	0	0	0
Marginal workers: Others	0	0	0
Non-workers	27	11	16
