= Kakana, Nancowry =

Kakana
- village
- Location in Andaman and Nicobar Islands, India Kakana (India)
- Coordinates: 8.186323°N 93.509907°E
- Country: India
- State: Andaman and Nicobar Islands
- District: Nicobar
- Tehsil: Nancowry

Population (2011)
  - Total: 270
- Time zone: UTC+5:30 (IST)
- Census code: 645131

Kakana is a village in the Nicobar district of Andaman and Nicobar Islands, India. It is located in the Nancowry tehsil.

== Demographics ==
According to the 2011 census of India, Kakana has 71 households. The effective literacy rate (i.e. the literacy rate of population excluding children aged 6 and below) is 86.55%.

Demographics (2011 Census)
	Total	Male	Female
Population	270	159	111
Children aged below 6 years	32	23	9
Scheduled caste	0	0	0
Scheduled tribe	261	150	111
Literates	206	123	83
Workers (all)	136	101	35
Main workers (total)	17	13	4
Main workers: Cultivators	0	0	0
Main workers: Agricultural labourers	0	0	0
Main workers: Household industry workers	0	0	0
Main workers: Other	17	13	4
Marginal workers (total)	119	88	31
Marginal workers: Cultivators	0	0	0
Marginal workers: Agricultural labourers	2	2	0
Marginal workers: Household industry workers	8	5	3
Marginal workers: Others	109	81	28
Non-workers	134	58	76
