= Chota Inak =

- village
- Location in Andaman and Nicobar Islands, India Chota Inak (India)
- Coordinates: 8.066°N 93.542°E
- Country: India
- State: Andaman and Nicobar Islands
- District: Nicobar
- Tehsil: Nancowry

Population (2011)
  - Total: 237
- Time zone: UTC+5:30 (IST)
- Census code: 645128

Chota Inak is a village in the Nicobar district of Andaman and Nicobar Islands, India. It is located in the Nancowry tehsil. The name means "Little Inake"; contrasted with Bada Inak ("Greater Inak").

== Demographics ==
According to the 2011 census of India, Chota Inak has 42 households. The effective literacy rate (i.e. the literacy rate of population excluding children aged 6 and below) is 77.54%.

Demographics (2011 Census)
	Total	Male	Female
Population	237	140	97
Children aged below 6 years	50	33	17
Scheduled caste	0	0	0
Scheduled tribe	199	111	88
Literates	145	91	54
Workers (all)	83	74	9
Main workers (total)	46	45	1
Main workers: Cultivators	0	0	0
Main workers: Agricultural labourers	0	0	0
Main workers: Household industry workers	0	0	0
Main workers: Other	46	45	1
Marginal workers (total)	37	29	8
Marginal workers: Cultivators	0	0	0
Marginal workers: Agricultural labourers	0	0	0
Marginal workers: Household industry workers	0	0	0
Marginal workers: Others	37	29	8
Non-workers	154	66	88
