= Pulopanja =

Pulopanja Pulo Panja
- village
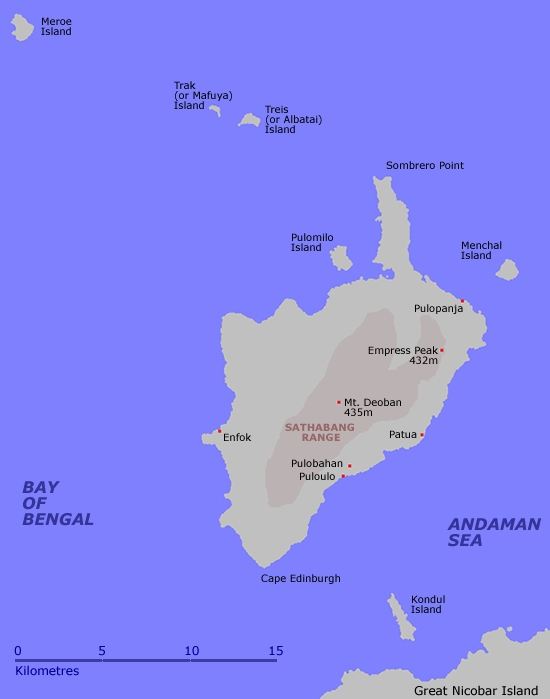
- Pulopanja is located in north-eastern region of the Little Nicobar Island

- Location in India
- Coordinates: 7.368120°N 93.744345°E
- Country: India
- State: Andaman and Nicobar Islands
- District: Nicobar
- Tehsil: Great Nicobar

Population (2011)
  - Total: 75
- Time zone: UTC+5:30 (IST)
- Census code: 645158

Pulopanja is a village in the Nicobar district of Andaman and Nicobar Islands, India. It is on the Little Nicobar Island and is administered as part of the Great Nicobar tehsil. The village suffered severe damage during the 2004 Indian Ocean earthquake and tsunami.

== Demographics ==
According to the 2011 census of India, Pulopanja has 16 households. The effective literacy rate (i.e. the literacy rate excluding children aged 6 and below) is 42.37%.

Demographics (2011 Census)
	Total	Male	Female
Population	75	42	33
Children aged below 6 years	16	8	8
Scheduled caste	0	0	0
Scheduled tribe	74	41	33
Literates	25	19	6
Workers (all)	0	0	0
Main workers (total)	0	0	0
Main workers: Cultivators	0	0	0
Main workers: Agricultural labourers	0	0	0
Main workers: Household industry workers	0	0	0
Main workers: Other	0	0	0
Marginal workers (total)	0	0	0
Marginal workers: Cultivators	0	0	0
Marginal workers: Agricultural labourers	0	0	0
Marginal workers: Household industry workers	0	0	0
Marginal workers: Others	0	0	0
Non-workers	75	42	33
