= Tropical rainforest climate =

Type of tropical climate in which there is no dry season

Worldwide zones of tropical rainforest climate (Af)

The tropical rainforest climate, in some cases classified as an equatorial climate, is a tropical climate sub-type that experiences high mean annual temperatures, small temperature ranges, high humidity, and rain that falls throughout the year with no dry season. Regions with this climate are typically designated Af by the Köppen climate classification.

The tropical rainforest climate is usually found within 10 to 15 degrees latitude of the equator. There are some other areas at higher latitudes that fall into the category, such as the coast of southeast Florida in the United States, and the Okinawa Islands in Japan.

The difference in temperature between day and night may be larger than the average change in temperature during the year.

As the name implies, the most common biome within this climate is tropical rainforest. However, a significant portion of what is considered "tropical rainforest" lies in other A-type climates, and some regions in this climate are not forests but rather flooded grasslands and savannas.

== Equatorial climates and tropical trade-wind climates ==
When tropical rainforest climates are more dominated by the Intertropical Convergence Zone (ITCZ) than the trade winds (and with no or rare cyclones), so usually located near the equator, they are also called equatorial climates. Otherwise, when they are more dominated by the trade winds than the ITCZ, they are called tropical trade-wind climates. In pure equatorial climates, the atmospheric pressure is almost constantly low so the horizontal pressure gradient is low, and winds are rare and usually weak (except sea and land breezes in coastal areas). In tropical trade-wind climates, often located at higher latitudes than the equatorial climates, the wind is almost permanent, which leads to rainforests that are impoverished compared to those of equatorial climates, due to their necessary resistance to strong winds accompanying tropical disturbances.

== Cities ==
Asia

- Malacca - Car Nicobar, India
- Balikpapan, Indonesia
- Medan, Indonesia
- Palembang, Indonesia
- Ishigaki, Japan
- Kuching, Malaysia
- Johor Bahru, Malaysia
- Kuala Lumpur, Malaysia
- Davao City, Philippines
- Polomolok, Philippines
- Tacloban, Leyte, Philippines
- Singapore, Singapore
- Colombo, Sri Lanka
- Ratnapura, Sri Lanka
- Sri Jayawardenepura Kotte, Sri Lanka
- Orchid Island, Taiwan
- Nakhon Si Thammarat, Thailand

Oceania

- Pago Pago, American Samoa
- Tubuai, Austral Islands
- Kuranda, Queensland, Australia
- Innisfail, Queensland, Australia
- Palikir, Federated States of Micronesia
- Suva, Fiji
- Hanga Roa, Easter Island, Chile
- Hagåtña, Guam
- Atuona, French Polynesia
- Mata Utu, French Polynesia
- Papeete, French Polynesia
- Tarawa, Kiribati
- Majuro, Marshall Islands
- Alofi, Niue, New Zealand
- Koror, Palau
- Tabubil, Papua New Guinea
- Lae, Papua New Guinea
- Pitcairn Island
- Apia, Samoa
- Honiara, Solomon Islands
- Nuku’alofa, Tonga
- Funafuti, Tuvalu
- Hilo, Hawaii, United States
- Port Vila, Vanuatu

Africa

- Moroni, Comoros
- Kisumu, Kenya
- Harper, Liberia
- Greenville, Liberia
- Antalaha, Madagascar
- Manakara, Madagascar
- Toamasina, Madagascar
- Victoria, Seychelles
- Kampala, Uganda

Americas

- Punta Gorda, Belize
- Hamilton, Bermuda
- Villa Tunari, Bolivia
- Belém, Brazil
- Macaé, Brazil
- Salvador, Brazil
- Buenaventura, Valle del Cauca, Colombia
- Florencia, Colombia
- Leticia, Colombia
- Cocos Island, Costa Rica
- Limón, Costa Rica
- Higüey, Dominican Republic
- Puyo, Ecuador
- Saint-Laurent-du-Maroni, French Guiana
- Pointe-à-Pitre, Guadeloupe
- Puerto Barrios, Guatemala
- Georgetown, Guyana
- La Ceiba, Honduras
- Port Antonio, Jamaica
- Bluefields, Nicaragua
- Changuinola, Panama
- Iquitos, Peru
- Lelydorp, Suriname
- Paramaribo, Suriname
- Scarborough, Trinidad and Tobago
- West Palm Beach, Florida, United States

Paramaribo, Suriname

Climate chart (precipitation, max. and min. temperature)
J	F	M	A	M	J	J	A	S	O	N	D
200 30 22	140 30 22	150 30 22	210 31 22	290 30 23	290 31 22	230 31 22	170 32 23	90 32 23	90 33 23	120 32 23	180 30 22
- █ Average max. and min. temperatures in °C
- █ Precipitation totals in mm
Imperial conversion
J	F	M	A	M	J	J	A	S	O	N	D
7.9 86 72	5.5 86 72	5.9 86 72	8.3 88 72	11 86 73	11 88 72	9.1 88 72	6.7 90 73	3.5 90 73	3.5 91 73	4.7 90 73	7.1 86 72
- █ Average max. and min. temperatures in °F
- █ Precipitation totals in inches

Mbandaka, DR Congo

Climate chart (precipitation, max. and min. temperature)
J	F	M	A	M	J	J	A	S	O	N	D
80 31 19	100 32 20	150 32 20	140 31 20	130 31 20	110 30 19	100 30 17	100 29 17	200 30 19	210 30 19	190 30 19	120 30 19
- █ Average max. and min. temperatures in °C
- █ Precipitation totals in mm
Imperial conversion
J	F	M	A	M	J	J	A	S	O	N	D
3.1 88 66	3.9 90 68	5.9 90 68	5.5 88 68	5.1 88 68	4.3 86 66	3.9 86 63	3.9 84 63	7.9 86 66	8.3 86 66	7.5 86 66	4.7 86 66
- █ Average max. and min. temperatures in °F
- █ Precipitation totals in inches

Pontianak, Indonesia

Climate chart (precipitation, max. and min. temperature)
J	F	M	A	M	J	J	A	S	O	N	D
260 32 23	215 33 23	254 33 23	292 33 23	256 33 23	212 33 23	201 33 22	180 33 23	295 33 23	329 33 23	400 32 23	302 32 22
- █ Average max. and min. temperatures in °C
- █ Precipitation totals in mm
Imperial conversion
J	F	M	A	M	J	J	A	S	O	N	D
10 90 73	8.5 91 73	10 91 73	11 92 74	10 91 74	8.3 92 74	7.9 91 72	7.1 92 73	12 91 73	13 91 73	16 90 73	12 90 72
- █ Average max. and min. temperatures in °F
- █ Precipitation totals in inches

Kuala Lumpur, Malaysia

Climate chart (precipitation, max. and min. temperature)
J	F	M	A	M	J	J	A	S	O	N	D
227 33 24	193 33 24	270 34 25	302 34 25	230 34 25	146 33 25	165 33 24	174 33 25	220 33 24	284 33 24	356 32 24	281 32 24
- █ Average max. and min. temperatures in °C
- █ Precipitation totals in mm
- Source: Monthly Statistical Bulletin Sarawak
Imperial conversion
J	F	M	A	M	J	J	A	S	O	N	D
8.9 91 75	7.6 92 75	11 93 76	12 93 76	9.1 92 77	5.7 92 77	6.5 91 76	6.9 91 76	8.7 91 76	11 91 76	14 90 75	11 90 75
- █ Average max. and min. temperatures in °F
- █ Precipitation totals in inches

Davao, Philippines

Climate chart (precipitation, max. and min. temperature)
J	F	M	A	M	J	J	A	S	O	N	D
140 31 23	109 31 23	108 32 24	125 33 24	159 33 25	187 32 24	165 32 24	170 32 24	170 32 24	175 32 24	138 32 24	113 31 24
- █ Average max. and min. temperatures in °C
- █ Precipitation totals in mm
Imperial conversion
J	F	M	A	M	J	J	A	S	O	N	D
5.5 87 74	4.3 88 74	4.3 90 74	4.9 91 76	6.2 91 76	7.4 89 76	6.5 89 75	6.7 89 75	6.7 89 75	6.9 90 75	5.4 90 75	4.4 89 75
- █ Average max. and min. temperatures in °F
- █ Precipitation totals in inches

Quibdó, Colombia

Climate chart (precipitation, max. and min. temperature)
J	F	M	A	M	J	J	A	S	O	N	D
579 30 23	505 30 23	526 30 23	655 31 23	776 31 23	762 31 23	803 31 23	852 31 23	702 31 23	654 30 23	728 30 23	589 30 23
- █ Average max. and min. temperatures in °C
- █ Precipitation totals in mm
Imperial conversion
J	F	M	A	M	J	J	A	S	O	N	D
23 86 73	20 86 74	21 87 74	26 87 74	31 88 74	30 88 73	32 88 73	34 88 73	28 87 73	26 87 73	29 86 73	23 85 73
- █ Average max. and min. temperatures in °F
- █ Precipitation totals in inches

== See also ==
- Tropics
- Monsoon climate
- Tropical savanna climate
- Köppen climate classification
