= Berainak =

Berainak Badnak, Bada Inak
- village
- Location in Andaman and Nicobar Islands, India Berainak (India)
- Coordinates: 8.119444°N 93.513889°E
- Country: India
- State: Andaman and Nicobar Islands
- District: Nicobar
- Tehsil: Nancowry

Population (2011)
  - Total: 188
- Time zone: UTC+5:30 (IST)
- Census code: 645129

Berainak or Badnak is a village in the Nicobar district of Andaman and Nicobar Islands, India. It is located in the Nancowry tehsil. The name is also spelt as "Bada Inak" ("Greater Inak"; contrasted with Chota Inak or "Little Inak").

== Demographics ==
According to the 2011 census of India, Berainak/Badnak has 38 households. The effective literacy rate (i.e. the literacy rate of population excluding children aged 6 and below) is 64.38%.

Demographics (2011 Census)
	Total	Male	Female
Population	188	107	81
Children aged below 6 years	28	11	17
Scheduled caste	0	0	0
Scheduled tribe	153	75	78
Literates	103	65	38
Workers (all)	69	59	10
Main workers (total)	34	34	0
Main workers: Cultivators	0	0	0
Main workers: Agricultural labourers	0	0	0
Main workers: Household industry workers	0	0	0
Main workers: Other	34	34	0
Marginal workers (total)	35	25	10
Marginal workers: Cultivators	2	2	0
Marginal workers: Agricultural labourers	1	1	0
Marginal workers: Household industry workers	0	0	0
Marginal workers: Others	32	22	10
Non-workers	119	48	71
