= Shompen Village-A =

- village
- Country: India
- State: Andaman and Nicobar Islands
- District: Nicobar
- Tehsil: Great Nicobar

Population (2011)
  - Total: 10
- Time zone: UTC+5:30 (IST)
- 2011 census code: 645172

Shompen Village-A is a village in the Nicobar district of Andaman and Nicobar Islands, India. It is located in the Great Nicobar tehsil.

== Demographics ==
Along with Shompen Village-B, the village has the highest population of Shompen people. Before the 2004 Indian Ocean earthquake and tsunami, the village was home to 103 Shompens. However, by the time of the 2011 census, only 10 people were left in the village.

According to the 2011 census of India, Shompen Village-A has 2 households. The effective literacy rate (i.e. the literacy rate of population excluding children aged 6 and below) is 0%.

Demographics (2011 Census)
	Total	Male	Female
Population	10	8	2
Children aged below 6 years	0	0	0
Scheduled caste	0	0	0
Scheduled tribe	10	8	2
Literates	0	0	0
Workers (all)	0	0	0
Main workers (total)	0	0	0
Main workers: Cultivators	0	0	0
Main workers: Agricultural labourers	0	0	0
Main workers: Household industry workers	0	0	0
Main workers: Other	0	0	0
Marginal workers (total)	0	0	0
Marginal workers: Cultivators	0	0	0
Marginal workers: Agricultural labourers	0	0	0
Marginal workers: Household industry workers	0	0	0
Marginal workers: Others	0	0	0
Non-workers	10	8	2
