= Shompen Village-B =

- village
- Country: India
- State: Andaman and Nicobar Islands
- District: Nicobar
- Tehsil: Great Nicobar

Population (2011)
  - Total: 44
- Time zone: UTC+5:30 (IST)
- Census code: 645176

Shompen Village-B is a village in the Nicobar district of the Andaman and Nicobar Islands, India. It is located in the Great Nicobar tehsil.

== Demographics ==
According to the 2011 census of India, Shompen Village-B has 11 households. The effective literacy rate (i.e. the literacy rate of population excluding children aged 6 and below) is 0%. Along with Shompen Village-A, the village has the highest population of Shompen people. Before the 2004 Indian Ocean earthquake and tsunami, the village was home to 106 Shompens. However, by the 2011 census, it had only 44 people.

Demographics (2011 Census)
| | Total | Male | Female |
|---|---|---|---|
| Population | 44 | 33 | 11 |
| Children aged below 6 years | 0 | 0 | 0 |
| Scheduled caste | 0 | 0 | 0 |
| Scheduled tribe | 44 | 33 | 11 |
| Literates | 0 | 0 | 0 |
| Workers (all) | 0 | 0 | 0 |
| Main workers (total) | 0 | 0 | 0 |
| Main workers: Cultivators | 0 | 0 | 0 |
| Main workers: Agricultural labourers | 0 | 0 | 0 |
| Main workers: Household industry workers | 0 | 0 | 0 |
| Main workers: Other | 0 | 0 | 0 |
| Marginal workers (total) | 0 | 0 | 0 |
| Marginal workers: Cultivators | 0 | 0 | 0 |
| Marginal workers: Agricultural labourers | 0 | 0 | 0 |
| Marginal workers: Household industry workers | 0 | 0 | 0 |
| Marginal workers: Others | 0 | 0 | 0 |
| Non-workers | 44 | 33 | 11 |
