= Car Nicobar (disambiguation) =

Car Nicobar is the northernmost of the Nicobar Islands, and one of three local administrative divisions of Nicobar district, Andaman and Nicobar Islands, India.

Car Nicobar may also refer to:

- Car Nicobar Air Force Station, Indian Air Force
- Car Nicobar-class patrol vessel, Indian Navy
- Car Nicobar common snow flat (Tagiades japetus), a species of spread-winged skipper butterfly
- Car Nicobar Subdivision, Nicobar district, Andaman and Nicobar Islands, India
- Car Nicobarese, an Austroasiatic language spoken in the Nicobar Islands

== See also ==
- Nicobar (disambiguation)
