= Vikas Nagar =

- village
- Location in Andaman and Nicobar Islands, India Vikas Nagar (India)
- Coordinates: 8.119°N 93.516°E
- Country: India
- State: Andaman and Nicobar Islands
- District: Nicobar
- Tehsil: Nancowry

Population (2011)
  - Total: 235
- Time zone: UTC+5:30 (IST)
- Census code: 645130

Vikas Nagar is a village in the Nicobar district of Andaman and Nicobar Islands, India. It is located in the Nancowry tehsil. It is populated by people from the former Trinket village, which was evacuated after the 2004 Indian Ocean earthquake and tsunami.

== Demographics ==
According to the 2011 census of India, Vikas Nagar has 48 households. The effective literacy rate (i.e. the literacy rate of population excluding children aged 6 and below) is 74.27%.

Demographics (2011 Census)
	Total	Male	Female
Population	235	156	79
Children aged below 6 years	29	19	10
Scheduled caste	0	0	0
Scheduled tribe	174	97	77
Literates	153	109	44
Workers (all)	146	113	33
Main workers (total)	72	65	7
Main workers: Cultivators	6	2	4
Main workers: Agricultural labourers	0	0	0
Main workers: Household industry workers	0	0	0
Main workers: Other	66	63	3
Marginal workers (total)	74	48	26
Marginal workers: Cultivators	27	20	7
Marginal workers: Agricultural labourers	0	0	0
Marginal workers: Household industry workers	2	2	0
Marginal workers: Others	45	26	19
Non-workers	89	43	46
