= Jhoola =

Jhoola may refer to:

- Swing (seat), jhoola in Hindi
- Simple suspension bridge, a rope bridge in India
- Jhulan Purnima, a Hindu festival
- Jhoola (1941 film), a 1941 Indian Hindi-language film, starring Ashok Kumar
- Jhoola (1962 film), a 1962 Indian film by K. Shankar
- Jhoola, Nancowry, a village in India
