= Jhoola, Nancowry =

Jhoola
- village
- Location in Andaman and Nicobar Islands, India Jhoola (India)
- Coordinates: 8.004701°N 93.348356°E
- Country: India
- State: Andaman and Nicobar Islands
- District: Nicobar
- Tehsil: Nancowry

Population (2011)
  - Total: 4
- Time zone: UTC+5:30 (IST)
- Census code: 645046

Jhoola is a village in the Nicobar district of Andaman and Nicobar Islands, India. It is located in the Nancowry tehsil.

== Demographics ==
The village was severely affected by the 2004 Indian Ocean earthquake and tsunami, and nearly vanished from the map. By the time of the 2011 census of India, Jhoola had only 1 surviving household. The effective literacy rate (i.e. the literacy rate of population excluding children aged 6 and below) is 75%.

Demographics (2011 Census)
	Total	Male	Female
Population	4	2	2
Children aged below 6 years	0	0	0
Scheduled caste	0	0	0
Scheduled tribe	4	2	2
Literates	3	2	1
Workers (all)	2	1	1
Main workers (total)	2	1	1
Main workers: Cultivators	0	0	0
Main workers: Agricultural labourers	0	0	0
Main workers: Household industry workers	0	0	0
Main workers: Other	2	1	1
Marginal workers	0	0	0
Non-workers	2	1	1
