= Knot, Nancowry =

Knot Nuot
- village
- Location in Andaman and Nicobar Islands, India Knot (India)
- Coordinates: 8.00°N 93.505°E
- Country: India
- State: Andaman and Nicobar Islands
- District: Nicobar
- Tehsil: Nancowry

Population (2011)
  - Total: 9
- Time zone: UTC+5:30 (IST)
- Census code: 645122

Knot is a village in the Nicobar district of Andaman and Nicobar Islands, India. It is located in the Nancowry tehsil.

== Demographics ==
According to the 2011 census of India, Knot has 3 households. The effective literacy rate (i.e. the literacy rate of population excluding children aged 6 and below) is 77.78%.

Demographics (2011 Census)
	Total	Male	Female
Population	9	4	5
Children aged below 6 years	0	0	0
Scheduled caste	0	0	0
Scheduled tribe	9	4	5
Literates	7	3	4
Workers (all)	4	2	2
Main workers (total)	4	2	2
Main workers: Cultivators	0	0	0
Main workers: Agricultural labourers	0	0	0
Main workers: Household industry workers	0	0	0
Main workers: Other	4	2	2
Marginal workers (total)	0	0	0
Marginal workers: Cultivators	0	0	0
Marginal workers: Agricultural labourers	0	0	0
Marginal workers: Household industry workers	0	0	0
Marginal workers: Others	0	0	0
Non-workers	5	2	3
