= Banderkari =

Banderkari Pulu
- village
- Location in Andaman and Nicobar Islands, India Banderkari (India)
- Coordinates: 8.051°N 93.531°E
- Country: India
- State: Andaman and Nicobar Islands
- District: Nicobar
- Tehsil: Nancowry

Population (2011)
  - Total: 23
- Time zone: UTC+5:30 (IST)
- Census code: 645116

Banderkari/Pulu is a village in the Nicobar district of Andaman and Nicobar Islands, India. It is located in the Nancowry tehsil.

== Demographics ==
According to the 2011 census of India, Banderkari/Pulu has 11 households. The effective literacy rate (i.e. the literacy rate of population excluding children aged 6 and below) is 70.59%.

Demographics (2011 Census)
	Total	Male	Female
Population	23	11	12
Children aged below 6 years	6	3	3
Scheduled caste	0	0	0
Scheduled tribe	23	11	12
Literates	12	7	5
Workers (all)	7	6	1
Main workers (total)	1	1	0
Main workers: Cultivators	0	0	0
Main workers: Agricultural labourers	0	0	0
Main workers: Household industry workers	0	0	0
Main workers: Other	1	1	0
Marginal workers (total)	6	5	1
Marginal workers: Cultivators	0	0	0
Marginal workers: Agricultural labourers	0	0	0
Marginal workers: Household industry workers	0	0	0
Marginal workers: Others	6	5	1
Non-workers	16	5	11
