= Daring, Nancowry =

Daring
- village
- Location in Andaman and Nicobar Islands, India Daring (India)
- Coordinates: 8.102548°N 93.500440°E
- Country: India
- State: Andaman and Nicobar Islands
- District: Nicobar
- Tehsil: Nancowry

Population (2011)
  - Total: 115
- Time zone: UTC+5:30 (IST)
- Census code: 645111

Daring is a village in the Nicobar district of Andaman and Nicobar Islands, India. It is located in the Nancowry tehsil.

== Demographics ==
According to the 2011 census of India, Daring has 27 households. The effective literacy rate (i.e. the literacy rate of population excluding children aged 6 and below) is 76.92%.

Demographics (2011 Census)
	Total	Male	Female
Population	115	65	50
Children aged below 6 years	24	12	12
Scheduled caste	0	0	0
Scheduled tribe	112	65	47
Literates	70	43	27
Workers (all)	45	36	9
Main workers (total)	16	9	7
Main workers: Cultivators	0	0	0
Main workers: Agricultural labourers	1	1	0
Main workers: Household industry workers	0	0	0
Main workers: Other	15	8	7
Marginal workers (total)	29	27	2
Marginal workers: Cultivators	0	0	0
Marginal workers: Agricultural labourers	0	0	0
Marginal workers: Household industry workers	1	0	1
Marginal workers: Others	28	27	1
Non-workers	70	29	41
