= Munak, Nicobar =

Munak Munak incl. Ponioo/Moul
- village
- Location in Andaman and Nicobar Islands, India Munak (India)
- Coordinates: 8.010°N 93.505°E
- Country: India
- State: Andaman and Nicobar Islands
- District: Nicobar
- Tehsil: Nancowry

Population (2011)
  - Total: 117
- Time zone: UTC+5:30 (IST)
- Census code: 645125

Munak is a village in the Nicobar district of Andaman and Nicobar Islands, India. It is located in the Nancowry tehsil.

== Demographics ==
The village was severely affected by the 2004 Indian Ocean earthquake and tsunami. According to the 2011 census of India, Munak (including Ponioo/Moul) has 24 households. The effective literacy rate (i.e. the literacy rate of population excluding children aged 6 and below) is 85.26%.

Demographics (2011 Census)
	Total	Male	Female
Population	117	51	66
Children aged below 6 years	22	9	13
Scheduled caste	0	0	0
Scheduled tribe	115	50	65
Literates	81	37	44
Workers (all)	46	25	21
Main workers (total)	15	7	8
Main workers: Cultivators	0	0	0
Main workers: Agricultural labourers	0	0	0
Main workers: Household industry workers	0	0	0
Main workers: Other	15	7	8
Marginal workers (total)	31	18	13
Marginal workers: Cultivators	0	0	0
Marginal workers: Agricultural labourers	0	0	0
Marginal workers: Household industry workers	5	3	2
Marginal workers: Others	26	15	11
Non-workers	71	26	45
