= Changup =

Changup Changua
- village
- Location in Andaman and Nicobar Islands, India Changup (India)
- Coordinates: 8.029012°N 93.495341°E
- Country: India
- State: Andaman and Nicobar Islands
- District: Nicobar
- Tehsil: Nancowry

Population (2011)
  - Total: 146
- Time zone: UTC+5:30 (IST)
- Census code: 645119

Changua, also known as Changup, is a village in the Nicobar district of Andaman and Nicobar Islands, India. It is located in the Nancowry tehsil.

== Demographics ==
According to the 2011 census of India, Changua has 36 households. The effective literacy rate (i.e. the literacy rate of population excluding children aged 6 and below) is 62.18%.

Demographics (2011 Census)
	Total	Male	Female
Population	146	73	73
Children aged below 6 years	27	15	12
Scheduled caste	0	0	0
Scheduled tribe	145	72	73
Literates	74	41	33
Workers (all)	79	40	39
Main workers (total)	13	11	2
Main workers: Cultivators	1	1	0
Main workers: Agricultural labourers	3	3	0
Main workers: Household industry workers	0	0	0
Main workers: Other	9	7	2
Marginal workers (total)	66	29	37
Marginal workers: Cultivators	1	1	0
Marginal workers: Agricultural labourers	26	12	14
Marginal workers: Household industry workers	20	6	14
Marginal workers: Others	19	10	9
Non-workers	67	33	34
