= Chowra Island =

Island in India

Chowra
Native name: Sőnenyő / Sanenyo / Sanenya
- Location within Andaman and Nicobar Islands

Geography
- Location: Bay of Bengal
- Coordinates: 8.455°N 93.045°E
- Archipelago: Nicobar Islands
- Adjacent to: Indian Ocean
- Total islands: 1
- Major islands: Chowra
- Area: 5.85 km^{2} (2.26 sq mi)
- Length: 2.3 km (1.43 mi)
- Width: 3.3 km (2.05 mi)
- Coastline: 10 km (6 mi)
- Highest elevation: 104.5 m (342.8 ft)

Administration
- India
- District: Nicobar
- Island group: Nicobar Islands
- Subdivisions of India: Nancowry Subdivision
- Largest settlement: Southern Agency (pop. 750)

Demographics
- Population: 1,270 (2011)
- Pop. density: 217/km^{2} (562/sq mi)
- Ethnic groups: Nicobarese people

Additional information
- Time zone: IST (UTC+5:30)
- PIN: 744301
- Telephone code: 03192
- ISO code: IN-AN-00
- Official website: www.and.nic.in
- Literacy: 84.4%
- Avg. summer temperature: 32.0 °C (89.6 °F)
- Avg. winter temperature: 28.0 °C (82.4 °F)
- Sex ratio: ♂/♀
- Census Code: 35.638.0002
- Official Languages: Hindi, English, Tamil; Chaura (regional)

Chowra is an island in the Andaman and Nicobar islands group of India. It is located north of Teressa island and to the south of Battimalv Island in the Indian Ocean. It is also known as Choura, Tatat or Sanenyo.

== History ==
The island suffered severe damage during the 2004 Indian Ocean earthquake and tsunami.

== Geography ==
The island is generally flat but has a 104.5 m high rocky upland at its southern end. Coral reefs extend about 1.5 miles from the northwestern side of the island.

== Demographics ==
The island has three villages, belonging to 5 clans. Tahaila Beach is located on the east coast, where the jetty is. Northern Agency and Southern Agency are in the middle of the island, and consist of former inhabitants of: Alhiat, Chongkamong, Kuitasuk, Raihion and Tahaila. According to 2011 census, 1270 people lived in the three villages on the island:

- Tahaila Beach: 10
- Northern Agency: 517
  - Tahaila: 372
  - Chongkamong: 145
- Southern Agency: 743
  - Alhiat: 190
  - Kuitasuk: 277
  - Raihion: 276

== Administration ==
The island belongs to Teressa-Chowra Taluk of the township of Nancowry.

== Culture ==
Chowra island has five clans. Each year, one of the clans organizes a 3-week festival Panuohonot ("pig festival") according to the rotation system. The preparation for the festival lasts several months, and members of the other clans offer some help with the organization. The festival is celebrated in memory of the ancestors, at the onset of north-east winds. The festival features singing and dancing, with a canoe race at the end. At the onset of the south-west winds, Kancheuollo ("chicken festival") is celebrated.

The unpredictable climate of the Bay of Bengal, and the importance of seafaring to the local economy, made accurate predicition of weather vital to Chowra's society. Traditionally, the people of Chowra did not rely on written calendars, instead appointing experts on weather conditions and seasonal change called tamol sahiöh, who was consulted before any significant seagoing activities and decided on the date of every seasonal festival year-on-year. This system of orally-transmitted knowledge, based on long observation of the relation between phases of the moon, the state of the sea, and the weather, allowed for accurate day-to-day weather forecasts; the forecasts of the Chowraites were well known for this.

=== Canoes ===
The ap, the Chowraite canoe, has an integral place in the island's culture. Chowraite canoes were known to be of an especially high quality, and the ap was treated as a living force; ritual canoe burials have taken place within living memory. A man who wished to build a canoe would first travel to one of the nearby islands with wood of high quality, such as Teressa, Katchal and Nancowry, where he would perform manual labour in exchange for permission to fell and use a tree of his choice. The master craftsman would select an ideal tree, and fell it with the help of 3 to 4 men, who would crudely carve it out where it was felled. Two coconuts would then be scooped out and filled with a mixture of grated coconut and chicken blood; one would be placed in the stump of the felled tree, and the other in the canoe. The coconut in the stump was thought to distract the spirit of the tree, and thus prevent it from noticing the canoe being taken away.

The roughly shaped canoe would then be moved carefully, by 20-30 men, to the shore, where it would be fully carved out and made watertight. Three masts and sails would be added, and the hull would be widened using heat. When the canoe was sea-worthy, it would be sailed to Chowra at dawn or in the early morning, and there disassembled. Some days later the team that had built it would complete the vessel by fine-tuning and re-assembling it; from this point the canoe is considered a living being, part of the Chowraite community.

== Image gallery ==
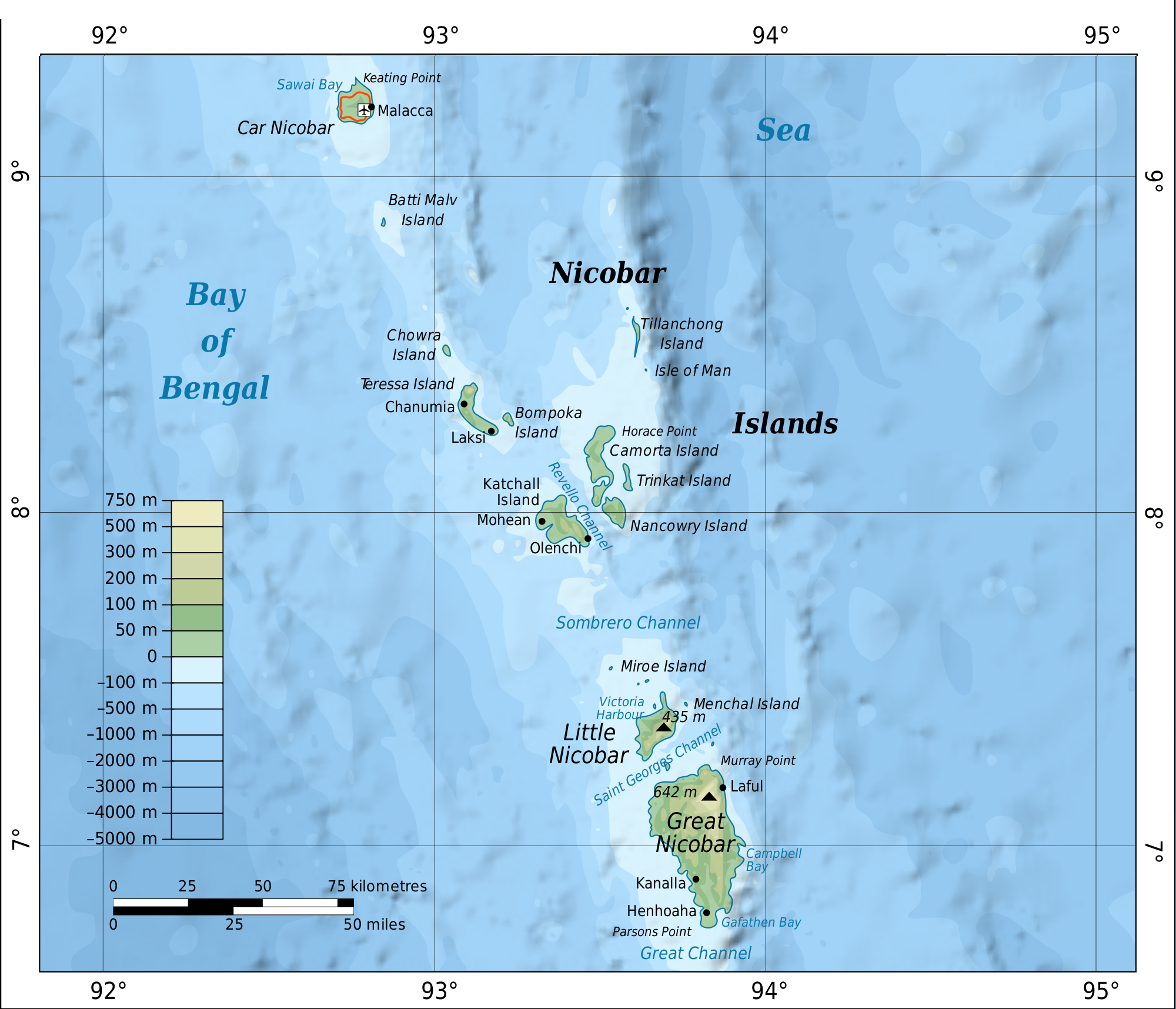
Map
