= Chanol =

Chanel Chanol
- village
- Location in Andaman and Nicobar Islands, India Chanel (India)
- Coordinates: 8.068°N 93.496°E
- Country: India
- State: Andaman and Nicobar Islands
- District: Nicobar
- Tehsil: Nancowry

Population (2011)
  - Total: 13
- Time zone: UTC+5:30 (IST)
- Census code: 645113

Chanel, also known as Chanol, is a village in the Nicobar district of Andaman and Nicobar Islands, India. It is located in the Nancowry tehsil.

== Demographics ==
According to the 2011 census of India, Chanel has 2 households. The effective literacy rate (i.e. the literacy rate of population excluding children aged 6 and below) is 54.55%.

Demographics (2011 Census)
	Total	Male	Female
Population	13	7	6
Children aged below 6 years	2	2	0
Scheduled caste	0	0	0
Scheduled tribe	13	7	6
Literates	6	3	3
Workers (all)	3	2	1
Main workers (total)	0	0	0
Main workers: Cultivators	0	0	0
Main workers: Agricultural labourers	0	0	0
Main workers: Household industry workers	0	0	0
Main workers: Other	0	0	0
Marginal workers (total)	3	2	1
Marginal workers: Cultivators	0	0	0
Marginal workers: Agricultural labourers	0	0	0
Marginal workers: Household industry workers	0	0	0
Marginal workers: Others	3	2	1
Non-workers	10	5	5
