= Payuha =

- village
- Location in Andaman and Nicobar Islands, India Payuha (India)
- Coordinates: 8.006°N 93.506°E
- Country: India
- State: Andaman and Nicobar Islands
- District: Nicobar
- Tehsil: Nancowry

Population (2011)
  - Total: 24
- Time zone: UTC+5:30 (IST)
- Census code: 645124

Payuha is a village in the Nicobar district of Andaman and Nicobar Islands, India. It is located in the Nancowry tehsil.

== Demographics ==
The village was severely affected by the 2004 Indian Ocean earthquake and tsunami. According to the 2011 census of India, Payuha has 5 households. The effective literacy rate (i.e. the literacy rate of population excluding children aged 6 and below) is 75%.

Demographics (2011 Census)
	Total	Male	Female
Population	24	15	9
Children aged below 6 years	4	3	1
Scheduled caste	0	0	0
Scheduled tribe	21	14	7
Literates	15	9	6
Workers (all)	7	6	1
Main workers (total)	7	6	1
Main workers: Cultivators	0	0	0
Main workers: Agricultural labourers	0	0	0
Main workers: Household industry workers	0	0	0
Main workers: Other	7	6	1
Marginal workers (total)	0	0	0
Marginal workers: Cultivators	0	0	0
Marginal workers: Agricultural labourers	0	0	0
Marginal workers: Household industry workers	0	0	0
Marginal workers: Others	0	0	0
Non-workers	17	9	8
