= Ramzoo =

Ramzoo Ramjaw, Ramjoo
- Village
- Location in Andaman and Nicobar Islands, India Ramzoo (India)
- Coordinates: 8.121189°N 93.479112°E
- Country: India
- State: Andaman and Nicobar Islands
- District: Nicobar
- Tehsil: Nancowry

Population (2011)
  - Total: 98
- Time zone: UTC+5:30 (IST)
- ISO 3166 code: IND
- Census code: 645126

Ramzoo is a village in the Nicobar district of Andaman and Nicobar Islands, India. It is located in the Nancowry tehsil.

== Demographics ==
The village was severely affected by the 2004 Indian Ocean earthquake and tsunami. According to the 2011 census of India, Ramzoo had 23 households. The effective literacy rate (i.e. the literacy rate of population excluding children aged 6 and below) was 77.5%.

Demographics (2011 Census)
	Total	Male	Female
Population	98	48	50
Children aged below 6 years	18	8	10
Scheduled caste	0	0	0
Scheduled tribe	97	47	50
Literates	62	32	30
Workers (all)	36	20	16
Main workers (total)	3	1	2
Main workers: cultivators	0	0	0
Main workers: agricultural labourers	1	0	1
Main workers: household industry workers	0	0	0
Main workers: other	2	1	1
Marginal workers (total)	33	19	14
Marginal workers: cultivators	1	0	1
Marginal workers: agricultural labourers	0	0	0
Marginal workers: household industry workers	3	1	2
Marginal workers: others	29	18	11
Non-workers	62	28	34
