= Pilpilow =

- village
- Location in Andaman and Nicobar Islands, India Pilpilow (India)
- Coordinates: 8.187374°N 93.489176°E
- Country: India
- State: Andaman and Nicobar Islands
- District: Nicobar
- Tehsil: Nancowry

Population (2011)
  - Total: 282
- Time zone: UTC+5:30 (IST)
- Census code: 645104

Pilpilow is a village in the Nicobar district of Andaman and Nicobar Islands, India. It is located in the Nancowry tehsil.

== Demographics ==
According to the 2011 census of India, Pilpilow has 62 households. The effective literacy rate (i.e. the literacy rate of population excluding children aged 6 and below) is 82.93%.

Demographics (2011 Census)
	Total	Male	Female
Population	282	152	130
Children aged below 6 years	36	18	18
Scheduled caste	0	0	0
Scheduled tribe	282	152	130
Literates	204	111	93
Workers (all)	124	95	29
Main workers (total)	14	10	4
Main workers: Cultivators	0	0	0
Main workers: Agricultural labourers	0	0	0
Main workers: Household industry workers	0	0	0
Main workers: Other	14	10	4
Marginal workers (total)	110	85	25
Marginal workers: Cultivators	3	3	0
Marginal workers: Agricultural labourers	0	0	0
Marginal workers: Household industry workers	18	6	12
Marginal workers: Others	89	76	13
Non-workers	158	57	101
