= Battimalv Island =

Island of the Nicobar Islands

Battimalv
- Location within Andaman and Nicobar Islands

Geography
- Location: Bay of Bengal
- Coordinates: 8.83°N 92.86°E
- Archipelago: Nicobar Islands
- Adjacent to: Indian Ocean
- Total islands: 1
- Major islands: Battimalv
- Area: 1.58 km^{2} (0.61 sq mi)
- Length: 1.9 km (1.18 mi)
- Width: 1.1 km (0.68 mi)
- Coastline: 6.1 km (3.79 mi)
- Highest elevation: 73 m (240 ft)

Administration
- India
- District: Nicobar
- Island group: Nicobar Islands
- Subdivisions of India: Car Nicobar Subdivision
- Taluk: Car Nicobar Taluk

Demographics
- Population: 0 (2014)
- Pop. density: 0/km^{2} (0/sq mi)

Additional information
- Time zone: IST (UTC+5:30)
- PIN: 744301
- Telephone code: 03192
- ISO code: IN-AN-00
- Official website: www.and.nic.in
- Avg. summer temperature: 30.2 °C (86.4 °F)
- Avg. winter temperature: 23.0 °C (73.4 °F)
- Census Code: 35.638.0001

Battimalv is an island of the Nicobar Islands. It is part of the Indian union territory of Andaman and Nicobar Islands.

== History ==
The island was severely affected by the tsunami that was caused by the 2004 Indian Ocean earthquake, which led to the destruction of a coconut plantation on the island that was being used by Car Nicobar families.

== Geography ==
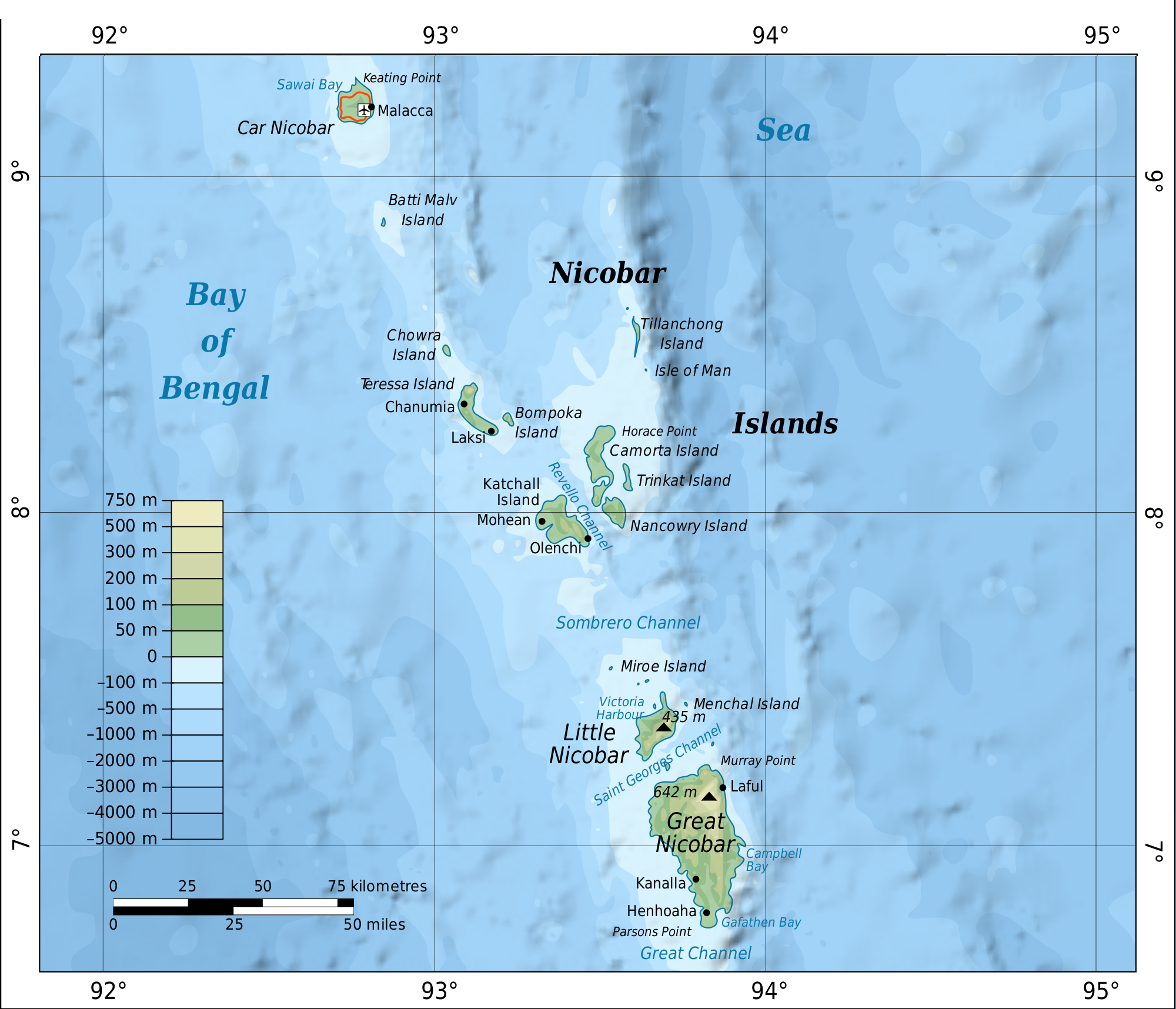
map

Battimalv lies between Car Nicobar and Nancowry. Battimalv is remarkably flat and small, having only 1.58 km^{2} (0.61 sq mi). The island lies 30 km to the south of Car Nicobar and has a lighthouse maintained by Car Nicobar people. The highest point of the island is a densely forested hill with a height of 73 m above sea level. The lighthouse is a 12 meter high steel lattice, whose light is visible from a distance of more than 20 km.

== Administration ==
Politically, Battimalv belongs to the township of Car Nicobar of Car Nicobar Taluk.

== Fauna ==
The island is a Sanctuary for the Nicobar pigeon.

== Transportation ==
You can reach the island by a 2-hour sail from the Dock on Keating Point.
