= Nicobarese =

Nicobarese may refer to:

- Something of, from, or related to Nicobar (disambiguation)
- Nicobarese people, the people of the islands
- Nicobarese languages, a group of Austroasiatic languages
