= Malacca, Nancowry =

Malacca
- village
- Location in Andaman and Nicobar Islands, India Malacca (India)
- Coordinates: 8.004714°N 93.561195°E
- Country: India
- State: Andaman and Nicobar Islands
- District: Nicobar
- Tehsil: Nancowry

Population (2011)
  - Total: 158
- Time zone: UTC+5:30 (IST)
- Census code: 645095

Malacca is a village in the Nicobar district of Andaman and Nicobar Islands, India. It is located in the Nancowry tehsil. It is also the largest settlement of Nancowry Island.

== Demographics ==
According to the 2011 census of India, Malacca has 35 households. The effective literacy rate (i.e. the literacy rate of population excluding children aged 6 and below) is 88.46%.

Demographics (2011 Census)
| | Total | Male | Female |
|---|---|---|---|
| Population | 158 | 76 | 82 |
| Children aged below 6 years | 28 | 8 | 20 |
| Scheduled caste | 0 | 0 | 0 |
| Scheduled tribe | 155 | 75 | 80 |
| Literates | 115 | 64 | 51 |
| Workers (all) | 40 | 28 | 12 |
| Main workers (total) | 15 | 12 | 3 |
| Main workers: Cultivators | 0 | 0 | 0 |
| Main workers: Agricultural labourers | 0 | 0 | 0 |
| Main workers: Household industry workers | 0 | 0 | 0 |
| Main workers: Other | 15 | 12 | 3 |
| Marginal workers (total) | 25 | 16 | 9 |
| Marginal workers: Cultivators | 0 | 0 | 0 |
| Marginal workers: Agricultural labourers | 0 | 0 | 0 |
| Marginal workers: Household industry workers | 0 | 0 | 0 |
| Marginal workers: Others | 25 | 16 | 9 |
| Non-workers | 118 | 48 | 70 |
