= Car Nicobar Subdivision =

Car Nicobar
Native name: Pu
- Location within Andaman and Nicobar Islands

Geography
- Location: Bay of Bengal
- Coordinates: 9.17°N 92.78°E
- Archipelago: Nicobar Islands
- Adjacent to: Indian Ocean
- Total islands: 1
- Major islands: Car Nicobar
- Area: 128.48 km^{2} (49.61 sq mi)
- Length: 15 km (9.3 mi)
- Width: 12 km (7.5 mi)
- Coastline: 51 km (31.7 mi)
- Highest elevation: 10 m (30 ft)

Administration
- India
- District: Nicobar
- Island group: Nicobar Islands
- Subdivisions of India: Car Nicobar Subdivision
- Taluk: Car Nicobar Taluk
- Largest settlement: Malacca (pop. 4200)

Demographics
- Population: 17841 (2014)
- Pop. density: 138.86/km^{2} (359.65/sq mi)
- Ethnic groups: Hindu, Nicobarese

Additional information
- Time zone: IST (UTC+5:30)
- PIN: 744301
- Telephone code: 03192
- ISO code: IN-AN-00
- Official website: www.and.nic.in
- Literacy: 84.4%
- Avg. summer temperature: 30.2 °C (86.4 °F)
- Avg. winter temperature: 23.0 °C (73.4 °F)
- Sex ratio: 1.2♂/♀
- Census Code: 35.638.0001
- Official Languages: Hindi, English, Tamil; Car (regional)

Car Nicobar Tehsil (Pu in the local language) is one of three local administrative divisions of the Indian district of Nicobar, part of the Indian union territory of Andaman and Nicobar Islands. It is a subdivision and also a tehsil, roughly equivalent to a county in its range of administrative powers. It is located in the Northern Nicobar Islands.

== Demographics ==
Nicobarese is the most spoken language in Car Nicobar tehsil. As of the 2011 census, Nicobarese is spoken as the first language by 88.61 percent of the tehsil's population. Population of major languages are

Nicobarese 15,809

Hindi 562

Bengali 381

Tamil 351

Telugu 176

Malayalam 162.

Languages of Car Nicobar tehsil (2011)
1. Nicobarese (88.6%)
2. Hindi (3.15%)
3. Bengali (2.13%)
4. Tamil (1.97%)
5. Telugu (0.99%)
6. Malayalam (0.91%)
7. Others (2.24%)

== Administration ==
Politically, The Tehsil includes the islands of Car Nicobar, along neighboring Battimalv Island.

== Image gallery ==
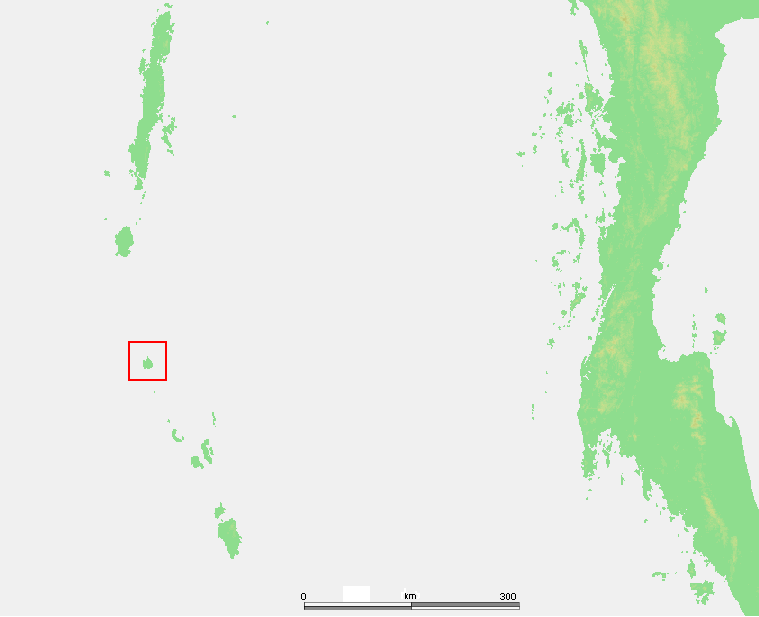
Location of Car Nicobar island

== See also ==
- Administrative divisions of India
