= Lawful, Great Nicobar =

Lawful Laful
- village
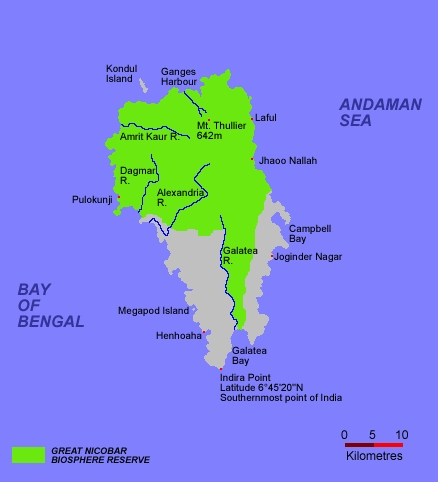
- Laful is located in north-eastern region of the Great Nicobar Island

- Location in India
- Coordinates: 7°10′15″N 93°52′34″E
- Country: India
- State: Andaman and Nicobar Islands
- District: Nicobar
- Tehsil: Great Nicobar
- Elevation: 28 m (92 ft)

Population (2011)
  - Total: 20
- Time zone: UTC+5:30 (IST)
- Census code: 645207

Lawful or Laful is a village in the Nicobar district of Andaman and Nicobar Islands, India. It is located in the Great Nicobar tehsil.

== Demographics ==
According to the 2011 census of India, Lawful has 5 households. The effective literacy rate (i.e. the literacy rate of population excluding children aged 6 and below) is 0%.

Demographics (2011 Census)
	Total	Male	Female
Population	20	12	8
Children aged below 6 years	3	2	1
Scheduled caste	0	0	0
Scheduled tribe	20	12	8
Literates	0	0	0
Workers (all)	0	0	0
Main workers (total)	0	0	0
Main workers: Cultivators	0	0	0
Main workers: Agricultural labourers	0	0	0
Main workers: Household industry workers	0	0	0
Main workers: Other	0	0	0
Marginal workers (total)	0	0	0
Marginal workers: Cultivators	0	0	0
Marginal workers: Agricultural labourers	0	0	0
Marginal workers: Household industry workers	0	0	0
Marginal workers: Others	0	0	0
Non-workers	20	12	8
