= Makhahu =

Makhahu Makachua / Maka Chua
- village
- Location in Andaman and Nicobar Islands, India Makhahu (India)
- Coordinates: 7.3739795°N 93.7084579°E
- Country: India
- State: Andaman and Nicobar Islands
- District: Nicobar
- Tehsil: Great Nicobar
- Elevation: 47 m (154 ft)

Population (2011)
  - Total: 47
- Time zone: UTC+5:30 (IST)
- 2011 census code: 645143

Makachua is a village in the Nicobar district of Andaman and Nicobar Islands, India. It is located in the Great Nicobar tehsil.

== Demographics ==
The village was affected by the 2004 Indian Ocean earthquake and tsunami. According to the 2011 census of India, Makachua has 17 households. The effective literacy rate (i.e. the literacy rate of population excluding children aged 6 and below) is 45.24%.

Demographics (2011 Census)
	Total	Male	Female
Population	47	32	15
Children aged below 6 years	5	2	3
Scheduled caste	0	0	0
Scheduled tribe	43	28	15
Literates	19	17	2
Workers (all)	3	3	0
Main workers (total)	3	3	0
Main workers: Cultivators	0	0	0
Main workers: Agricultural labourers	0	0	0
Main workers: Household industry workers	0	0	0
Main workers: Other	3	3	0
Marginal workers (total)	0	0	0
Marginal workers: Cultivators	0	0	0
Marginal workers: Agricultural labourers	0	0	0
Marginal workers: Household industry workers	0	0	0
Marginal workers: Others	0	0	0
Non-workers	44	29	15
