= Kamorta, Nancowry =

Kamorta Camorta / Kalatapu (incl. Sanuh)
- village
- Location in the Andaman and Nicobar Islands, and in the Bay of Bengal Kamorta (Bay of Bengal)
- Coordinates: 8.172877°N 93.481476°E
- Country: India
- State: Andaman and Nicobar Islands
- District: Nicobar
- Tehsil: Nancowry

Population (2011)
  - Total: 1,885
- Time zone: UTC+5:30 (IST)
- Census code: 645127

Kamorta or Kalatapu is a village on the Kamorta Island, in the Nicobar district of Andaman and Nicobar Islands. It is located in the Nancowry tehsil. This is also the home of Indian Naval Base named INS Kardip, which was commissioned in 1973.

== Demographics ==
According to the 2011 census of India, Kamorta/Kalatapu (including Sanuh) has 513 households. The effective literacy rate (i.e. the literacy rate of population excluding children aged 6 and below) is 88.44%.

Demographics (2011 Census)
	Total	Male	Female
Population	1885	1133	752
Children aged below 6 years	215	97	118
Scheduled caste	0	0	0
Scheduled tribe	536	255	281
Literates	1477	935	542
Workers (all)	914	805	109
Main workers (total)	885	781	104
Main workers: Cultivators	2	2	0
Main workers: Agricultural labourers	1	1	0
Main workers: Household industry workers	0	0	0
Main workers: Other	882	778	104
Marginal workers (total)	29	24	5
Marginal workers: Cultivators	0	0	0
Marginal workers: Agricultural labourers	0	0	0
Marginal workers: Household industry workers	0	0	0
Marginal workers: Others	29	24	5
Non-workers	971	328	643
