= Little Nicobar =

Indian island in the Bay of Bengal

Native name: Ong
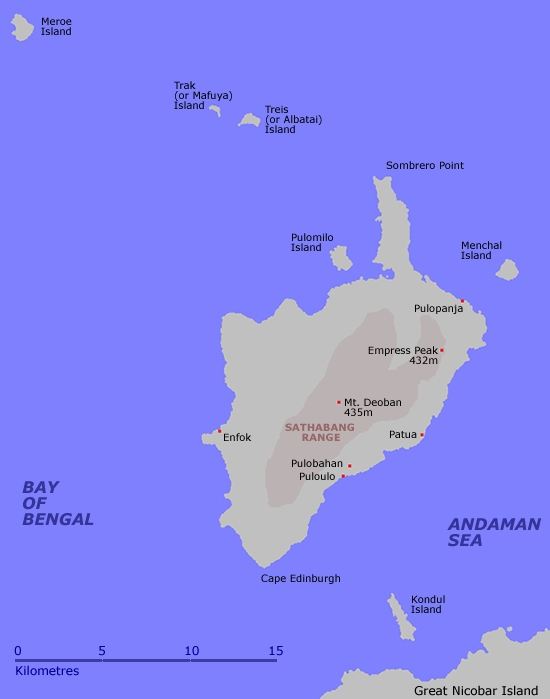
- Map of Little Nicobar

- Location in the Andaman and Nicobar Islands and in the Bay of Bengal Little Nicobar (Bay of Bengal)

Geography
- Location: Bay of Bengal
- Coordinates: 7.33°N 93.68°E
- Archipelago: Nicobar Islands
- Adjacent to: Indian Ocean
- Total islands: 1
- Major islands: Little Nicobar
- Area: 140 km^{2} (54 sq mi)
- Length: 24 km (14.9 mi)
- Width: 12 km (7.5 mi)
- Coastline: 71.6 km (44.49 mi)
- Highest elevation: 435 m (1427 ft)
- Highest point: Mount Deoban

Administration
- India
- District: Nicobar
- Island group: Nicobar Islands
- Subdivisions of India: Great Nicobar Subdivision
- Taluk: Little Nicobar
- Largest settlement: Puloulo (pop. 81)

Demographics
- Population: 278 (2014)
- Pop. density: 2/km^{2} (5/sq mi)
- Ethnic groups: Hindu, Nicobarese

Additional information
- Time zone: IST (UTC+5:30)
- PIN: 744301
- Telephone code: 03192
- ISO code: IN-AN-00
- Official website: www.and.nic.in
- Literacy: 84.4%
- Avg. summer temperature: 32.0 °C (89.6 °F)
- Avg. winter temperature: 28.0 °C (82.4 °F)
- Sex ratio: ♂/♀
- Census Code: 35.638.0002
- Official Languages: Hindi, English, Tamil; Southern Nicobarese (regional)

Little Nicobar (Nicobarese: Ong) is one of the Nicobar Islands, India, located to the north of Great Nicobar Island.

== History ==
The 2004 Indian Ocean earthquake and tsunami caused extensive damage to this island.

== Geography ==
Little Nicobar Island's area is 140 km^{2} (54 sq mi). There are a few smaller islands off of Little Nicobar's shores: Pulomilo, Menchal, Treis (Albatei), Trak (Mafuya) and Meroe. The island of Katchal is located 56 km (35 mi) to the north.

== Demographics ==
According to the 2011 census of India, Little Nicobar Island had 278 villagers in 59 households. The effective literacy rate (the literacy rate of population excluding children aged 6 and below) was 100%. Pulopanja, Pulobaha, Pulloullo, and Makhahu (Victoria Harbour) are the main villages on the island.

== Administration ==
The island belongs to the township of Great Nicobar of Little Nicobar Taluk.

== Image gallery ==
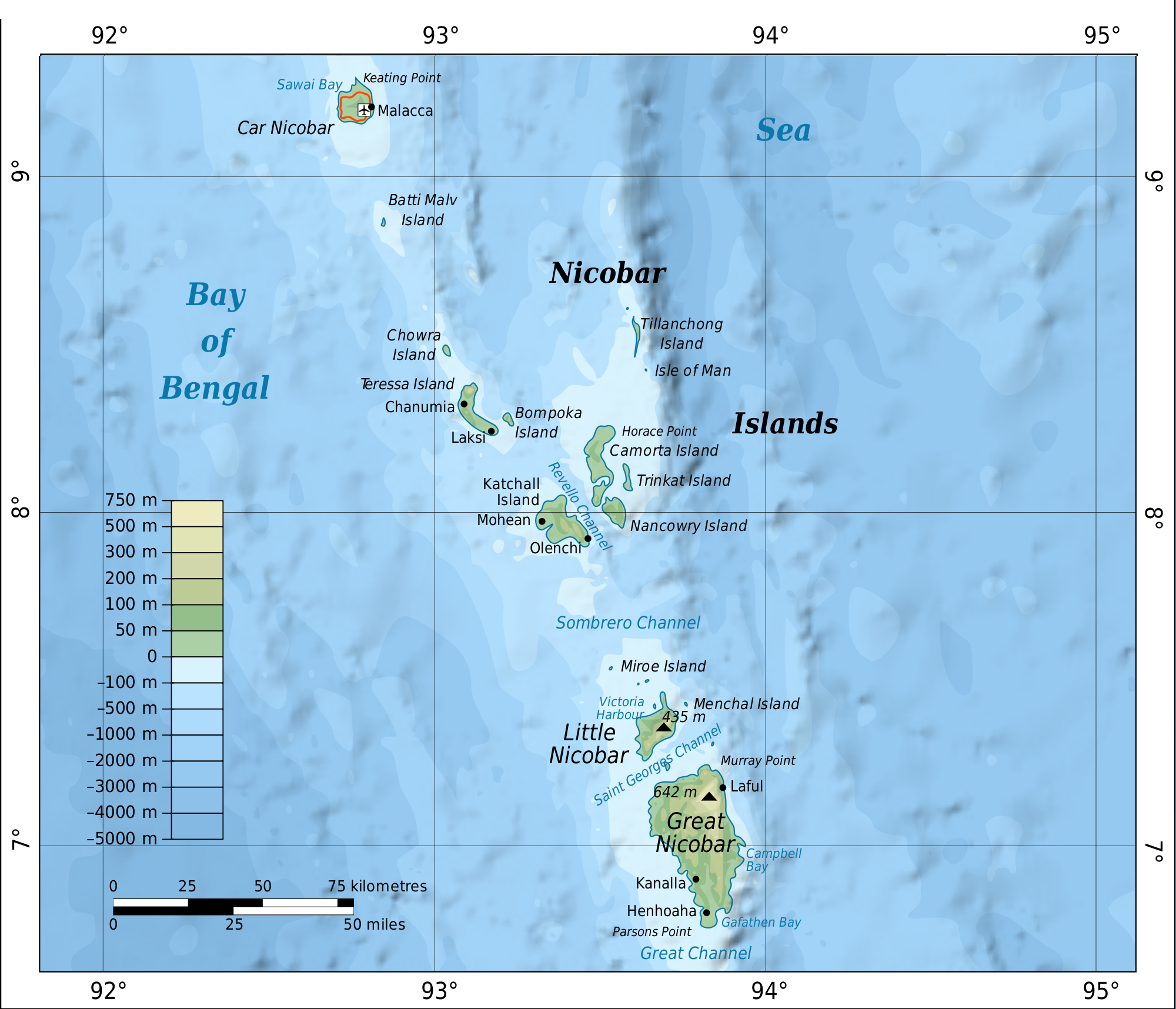
Map of the Nicobar Islands
