= INS Kardip =

- Kamorta, Andaman & Nicobar Islands

Site information
- Type: Naval station
- Controlled by: Indian Navy

Site history
- Built: 1973
- In use: 1973-present

Garrison information
- Occupants: Andaman and Nicobar Command

INS Kardip is a forward operating base of the Indian Navy under the joint-services Andaman and Nicobar Command located on Kamorta Island in the Andaman and Nicobar Islands. It was commissioned in 1973.

== History ==
After the 1962 Sino-Indian War, the Navy was tasked with the defence of the Andaman & Nicobar Islands. INS Jarawa was commissioned on Port Blair in 1964 as the main naval base in the islands.

By the early 1970s, it was evident that most unauthorized intrusions into the territorial waters of the islands by vessels of other nations were occurring in the southern Nicobar Islands. Given the distance of these islands from Port Blair, the navy decided to establish a forward operating base there to station and support large patrol craft. INS Kardip was hence commissioned in 1973 on Kamorta island. Ship maintenance facilities were established at INS Kardip soon thereafter.

== See also ==
Indian navy

- List of Indian Navy bases
- List of active Indian Navy ships

Integrated commands and units

- Armed Forces Special Operations Division
- Defence Cyber Agency
- Integrated Defence Staff
- Integrated Space Cell
- Indian Nuclear Command Authority
- Indian Armed Forces
- Special Forces of India

Other lists

- Strategic Forces Command
- List of Indian Air Force stations
- List of Indian Navy bases
- India's overseas military bases
