= Trinket Bay =

- village
- Location in Andaman and Nicobar Islands, India Trinket Bay (India)
- Coordinates: 7°12′48″N 93°51′25″E
- Country: India
- State: Andaman and Nicobar Islands
- District: Nicobar
- Tehsil: Great Nicobar

Population (2011)
  - Total: 3
- Time zone: UTC+5:30 (IST)
- Census code: 645208

Trinket Bay is a village in the Nicobar district of Andaman and Nicobar Islands, India. It is located in the Great Nicobar tehsil. It is located between Lawful and Afra on Great Nicobar island.

== History ==
Trinket was a panchayat village located on Great Nicobar, in the Nicobar district of Andaman and Nicobar Islands in India. In 2001 its population was 22. However, shortly after the 2004 Indian Ocean earthquake and tsunami, the population, most of the population moved to nearby shelters.

== Demographics ==
According to the 2011 census of India, Trinket Channel Bay has 1 household. The effective literacy rate (i.e. the literacy rate of population excluding children aged 6 and below) is 0%.

Demographics (2011 Census)
	Total	Male	Female
Population	3	2	1
Children aged below 6 years	0	0	0
Scheduled caste	0	0	0
Scheduled tribe	3	2	1
Literates	0	0	0
Workers (all)	0	0	0
Main workers (total)	0	0	0
Main workers: Cultivators	0	0	0
Main workers: Agricultural labourers	0	0	0
Main workers: Household industry workers	0	0	0
Main workers: Other	0	0	0
Marginal workers (total)	0	0	0
Marginal workers: Cultivators	0	0	0
Marginal workers: Agricultural labourers	0	0	0
Marginal workers: Household industry workers	0	0	0
Marginal workers: Others	0	0	0
Non-workers	3	2	1
