= Malacca, Car Nicobar =

Malacca U-rèk-ka
- Village
- Location in Andaman and Nicobar Islands, India Malacca (India)
- Coordinates: 9.170610°N 92.818755°E
- Country: India
- Union Territory: Andaman and Nicobar Islands
- District: Nicobar
- Tehsil: Car Nicobar

Population (2011)
  - Total: 1,637
- Time zone: UTC+5:30 (IST)
- Census code: 645019

Malacca is a village in the Nicobar district of Andaman and Nicobar Islands, India. It is located in the Car Nicobar tehsil, near the Car Nicobar Air Force Base.

== Demographics ==
According to the 2011 census of India, Malacca has 368 households. The effective literacy rate (i.e. the literacy rate of population excluding children aged 6 and below) is 77.9%.

Demographics (2011 Census)
	Total	Male	Female
Population	1637	928	709
Children aged below 6 years	135	75	60
Scheduled caste	0	0	0
Scheduled tribe	1362	704	658
Literates	1170	715	455
Workers (all)	807	583	224
Main workers (total)	380	323	57
Main workers: Cultivators	0	0	0
Main workers: Agricultural labourers	0	0	0
Main workers: Household industry workers	6	5	1
Main workers: Other	374	318	56
Marginal workers (total)	427	260	167
Marginal workers: Cultivators	11	1	10
Marginal workers: Agricultural labourers	2	2	0
Marginal workers: Household industry workers	109	54	55
Marginal workers: Others	305	203	102
Non-workers	830	345	485
