= Nancowry tehsil =

Nancowry Taluk (or Tehsil) is one of 7 local administrative divisions of the Indian district of Nicobar, part of the Indian union territory of Andaman and Nicobar Islands.

== Administration ==
A tehsil is an administrative division in India, roughly equivalent to a county in western nations in its range of administrative powers. Nancowry Taluk, headquartered at Malacca village on Nancowry Island, is located in the Nicobar Islands group. It is overseen by Assistant Commissioners stationed at Malacca village. It is one of several tehsils in Nicobar district.

== Geography ==
This tehsil incorporates entire Nancowry Island. Other nearby Islands, which are outside this tehsil, are Chowra Island, Teressa Island, Kamorta Island, Bompuka Island & other smaller islets.

== Demography ==
Nancowry tehsil's population according to 2011 Census of India figures was 1019, all on Nancowry Island.

== See also ==
- Administrative divisions of India
