= Nicobar district =

- District
- Location within Andaman and Nicobar Islands Location within India
- Coordinates: 9.157343°N 92.761087°E
- Country: India
- Union territory: Andaman and Nicobar Islands
- Formation: 1 August 1974
- headquarter: Malacca
- Time zone: UTC+5:30 (IST)
- PIN: 744301
- Telephone code: 03192
- Sex ratio: 1.2♂/♀
- Literacy: 84.4%
- Website: https://nicobars.andaman.nic.in/

Nicobar Islands
- Location within Bay of Bengal

Geography
- Location: Bay of Bengal
- Archipelago: Nicobar Islands
- Adjacent to: Indian Ocean
- Total islands: 30
- Major islands: Car Nicobar; Great Nicobar
- Area: 1,648.13 km^{2} (636.35 sq mi)
- Highest elevation: 642 m (2106 ft)

Demographics
- Population: 36,842 (2011)
- Pop. density: 22.3/km^{2} (57.8/sq mi)
- Ethnic groups: Nicobarese, Hindustani

Additional information
- Avg. summer temperature: 30.2 °C (86.4 °F)
- Avg. winter temperature: 23.0 °C (73.4 °F)
- Census Code: 35.638.0001
- Official Languages: Hindi, English, Car (regional)

Nicobar district is one of three districts in the Indian union territory of the Andaman and Nicobar Islands. The district's administrative territory encompasses all of the Nicobar Islands, which are located in the Indian Ocean, between the Bay of Bengal and the Andaman Sea. The headquarters of the district is the village of Malacca, located on the island of Car Nicobar.

The district administration is headed by a Deputy Commissioner, who in turn reports to the Lt. Governor of the Andaman and Nicobar Islands.

It is the fifth least populous district in the country (out of 640).

== Etymology ==
Falling on the sea route between South India / Sri Lanka and South East Asia, the sailors referred to it as the “land of the naked” i.e. Nakkavar which is perhaps the direct precursor of the current name “Nicobar’. The medieval Arabic name ‘Lankhabatus’ is a mere mistranscription and misapprehension of “Nankakar or Nakkavar”.

== History ==
The district was created on August 1, 1974, when it was separated from Andaman district.

== Geography ==
Nicobar district occupies an area of 1,648 square kilometres (636 sq mi), comparatively equivalent to Mauritius.

== Demographics ==
According to the 2011 census Nicobar district has a population of 36,842, roughly equal to the nation of Liechtenstein. This gives it a ranking of 636th in India (out of a total of 640). The district has a population density of 20 inhabitants per square kilometre (52/sq mi) . Its population growth rate over the decade 2001-2011 was -12.48%. Nicobars has a sex ratio of 778 females for every 1000 males, and a literacy rate of 77.5%.

The district is designated as an Integrated Tribal District and is home to significant numbers of indigenous peoples (namely, the Nicobarese and the Shompen, classified as Scheduled Tribes according to the Constitution of India), who form the majority of the district's population. Because of its status as a tribal area, travel to the district is restricted to Indian nationals, and special permit restrictions apply.

The district was severely affected by the tsunami that was caused by the 2004 Indian Ocean earthquake, which led to many deaths and damaged infrastructure.

Historical population
| Year | Pop. | ±% p.a. |
|---|---|---|
| 1901 | 6,511 | — |
| 1911 | 8,818 | +3.08% |
| 1921 | 9,272 | +0.50% |
| 1931 | 10,240 | +1.00% |
| 1941 | 12,452 | +1.98% |
| 1951 | 12,009 | −0.36% |
| 1961 | 14,563 | +1.95% |
| 1971 | 21,665 | +4.05% |
| 1981 | 30,454 | +3.46% |
| 1991 | 39,208 | +2.56% |
| 2001 | 42,068 | +0.71% |
| 2011 | 36,842 | −1.32% |

=== Language ===
Languages of Nicobar Islands district (2011)
1. Nicobarese (66.0%)
2. Hindi (9.83%)
3. Tamil (6.10%)
4. Telugu (4.05%)
5. Bengali (3.90%)
6. Kurukh (3.31%)
7. Malayalam (1.79%)
8. Punjabi (1.05%)
9. Others (3.99%)

Nicobarese, of the Austroasiatic language family is the most spoken language in Nicobar Islands. As of the 2011 census, Nicobarese is spoken as the first language by 65.98 percent of the district's population followed by Hindi (9.83%), Tamil (6.10%), Telugu (4.05%), Bengali (3.90%), Kurukh (3.31%), Malayalam (1.79%) and others.

=== Religion ===
Religions in Nicobar district (2011)
| Religion | Percent |
| Christianity | 70.78% |
| Hinduism | 23.56% |
| Islam | 3.63% |
| Sikhism | 0.93% |
| Other or not stated | 1.10% |

Christianity is followed by the majority of the people in Nicobar district. Hinduism is followed by a considerable population.

== Administrative divisions ==
As of 2016, The Nicobar district is divided into 3 sub-divisions and 8 taluks (tehsils).

- Car Nicobar Subdivision (HQ: Malacca, Car Nicobar)
  - Car Nicobar taluk (HQ: Malacca in Car Nicobar)
- Nancowry Subdivision (HQ: Malacca, Nancowry)
  - Teressa-Chowra taluk (HQ: Teressa)
  - Katchal taluk (HQ: Mildera)
  - Kamorta taluk (HQ: Kalatapu)
  - Nancowry taluk (HQ: Malacca in Nancowry)
- Great Nicobar Subdivision (HQ: Campbell Bay)
  - Little Nicobar taluk (HQ: Pulloullo)
  - North Great Nicobar taluk (HQ: Afra Bay)
  - South Great Nicobar taluk (HQ: Campbell Bay)

== See also ==
- Administrative divisions of India
