= INS Tarmugli =

The following ships of the Indian Navy have been named INS Tarmugli:

- INS Tarmugli (T64) is a Trinkat-class patrol vessel commissioned in 2002 and transferred to the Seychelles Coast Guard as PS Topaz in 2005
- INS Tarmugli (T91) is a Car Nicobar-class patrol vessel commissioned in 2016 and transferred to the Maldivian Coast Guard as MCGS Huravee in 2023
- INS Tarmugli (2023) is a Trinkat-class patrol vessel originally commissioned as INS Tillanchang in 2001. She was lent to the Maldivian Coastguard as MCGS Huravee in 2006. Returned to India in 2023 and renamed Tarmugli.
