= INS Tillanchang =

The following ships of the Indian Navy have been named INS Tillanchang:

- INS Tillanchang (T62) was a Trinkat-class patrol vessel commissioned in 2001 and transferred to the Maldivian coastguard as MCGS Huravee in 2006. She was replaced by a new MCGS Huravee in 2023, and was transferred back to India. Subsequently, she was recommissioned as INS Tarmugli in December 2023.
- INS Tillanchang (T92) is a Car Nicobar-class patrol vessel launched in 2015.
