= Seychelles People's Defence Force =

National military of Seychelles

- Force de défense populaire des Seychelles (French); Lafors Defans Pep Sesel (Seselwa Creole French)
- Flag of the SPDF
- Motto: Service before self
- Founded: 1977
- Service branches: Land Force Command; Seychelles Air Force; Seychelles Coast Guard
- Website: Official website

Leadership
- Commander-in-Chief & Minister of Defence: Patrick Herminie
- Chief of Defence Forces: Major General Michael Rosette

Personnel
- Military age: 18 years of age
- Conscription: Voluntary
- Active personnel: 650 (2012)

Expenditure
- Budget: €9.7 million (2012)
- Percent of GDP: 1% (2012)

Related articles
- History: 1981 Seychelles coup d'état attempt
- Ranks: Military ranks of the Seychelles

The Seychelles People's Defence Force (SPDF; French: Force de défense populaire des Seychelles; Seselwa Creole French: Lafors Defans Pepel Ses) is the national military of Seychelles. It consists of a number of distinct branches: the Infantry Unit, Coast Guard, Air Force and a Presidential Protection Unit.

== Branches ==
=== Land Force Command ===
The 200-strong army consists of a small infantry unit, a special unit, a formation of military policemen and a presidential guard. The land force has the following equipment, which according to IISS is probably hardly operational:

Type	Origin	Function	Amount
BRDM-2	Soviet Union	Reconnaissance vehicle	6
82mm M-43	Soviet Union	Mortar	6
ZPU-2	Soviet Union	Heavy machine gun	
ZPU-4	Soviet Union	Heavy machine gun	
37 mm automatic air defense gun M1939 (61-K)	Soviet Union	Anti-aircraft gun	

=== Coast Guard ===
The Seychelles Coast Guard is the maritime arm of the Seychelles People's Defence Force. Some of the ships they currently have include:

- 1 42m patrol boat – 268 tons full load – commissioned 1983
- 2 Rodman 101 crafts – Donated by UAE
- 2 Type 062-class gunboats – Donated by China
- 2 SDB Mk5 patrol vessels – PS Constant and PS Topaz built by GRSE of India to Seychelles defence as INS Tarasa and INS Tarmugli and donated by India in 2014 and 2015.
- 2 Wave Rider Class inshore patrol vessels – Donated by Sri Lanka in 2019.

=== Air Force ===
Roundel of the Seychelles Air Force

The Seychelles Air Force was originally formed in 1978 as the Air Wing and has the following aircraft:

Aircraft	Origin	Type	Variant	In service	Notes
Transport
Dornier 228	Germany	SAR / Utility		2	Donated by India
Harbin Y-12	China	Medevac / Patrol		1	
DHC-6 Twin Otter	Canada	Patrol / SAR		1	STOL capable aircraft

=== Presidential Security Unit (PSU) ===
The Presidential Security Unit (PSU) was created in 1977 alongside the Infantry Unit to engage in protection duties for the President of Seychelles and their residence. It also provides support during transit, and social gatherings.

Various instructors from foreign nations conduct training with the PSU. It is one of the most elite units in the SPDF. The PSU is located at State House and is administratively attached to the Special Forces Unit.

== Other components ==
=== National Brass Band ===
The National Brass Band is the official military band of the SPDF. Its origins date back to 1925 as the Brass Ensemble. It began when the Mariste Brothers of the Roman Catholic Mission training musicians to play the various instruments. The band was disbanded in 1943 as instruments were being delivered by the British Army. The band was reformed only to be disbanded after World War II, with its instruments being acquired by the Seychelles Scout Association.

A new brass band known as LAFANSA came into being, with a police band also being augmented. With the establishment of the Conservatoire of Music and Dance in 1981, the Police Band was reorganised into the National Brass Band under the patronage of the Ministry of Education.

Antoinc Azcmia became its first conductor, leading a unit which was from 1981 to 1996, a voluntary band (a unit in which musicians are employed on a part-time basis). Full-time musicians were recruited in 1996, and three years later, it was transferred to the Ministry of Defence and based at the Seychelles Defence Academy. Azcmia retired in 2001, being replaced by Thomas Busanya.

=== Educational institutions ===
==== Seychelles Defence Academy (SDA) ====
The Seychelles Defence Academy (SDA) was established on 2 June 1990 by President France-Albert René. SDA is the premier training institute of the SPDF. The first training camp of the SDA was at Point Larue. The first training was conducted with the help of advisors from the Tanzania People's Defence Force as well as former British Army personnel. It was later decided to shift the camp to Perseverance Island.

==== Military Training Centre (MTC) ====
The Military Training Centre (MTC) is located at Barbarons on the West Coast of Mahe. It is tasked to train all new recruits who join SPDF. Recruits undertake 90 days of extensive training at the MTC that covers a variety of military/civil subjects. After graduation, the new privates are posted to their unit of choice.

== Defence Forces Day ==
Defence Forces Day has been celebrated annually since 25 November 1982 to celebrate the victory of the SPDF over a group of foreign mercenaries who attacked the country in 1981. A commemorative parade is held at a Coast Guard Base.
