= MCGS Huravee =

The following ships of the Maldivian Coastguard have been named Huravee:

- MCGS Huravee (2006) is a Trinkat-class patrol vessel originally commissioned as INS Tillanchang in 2001. She was lent to the Maldivian Coastguard and renamed Huravee in 2006. Returned to India in 2023 and renamed Tarmugli.
- MCGS Huravee (2023) is a Car Nicobar-class patrol vessel commissioned in 2016 and transferred to the Maldivian Coast Guard as MCGS Huravee in 2023
