= Paira Island =

Island in the Andaman and Nicobar islands, India

- Location within Andaman and Nicobar Islands

Geography
- Location: Bay of Bengal
- Coordinates: 8.58°N 93.608°E
- Archipelago: Nicobar Islands
- Adjacent to: Indian Ocean
- Total islands: 1
- Major islands: Paira
- Area: 0.05 km^{2} (0.019 sq mi)
- Length: 0.3 km (0.19 mi)
- Width: 0.2 km (0.12 mi)
- Coastline: 1.1 km (0.68 mi)
- Highest elevation: 86 m (282 ft)
- Highest point: Paira Rock

Administration
- India
- District: Nicobar
- Island group: Nicobar Islands
- Subdivisions of India: Nancowry Subdivision
- Taluk: Teressa tehsil

Demographics
- Population: 0 (2011)
- Pop. density: 0/km^{2} (0/sq mi)
- Ethnic groups: Hindu, Nicobarese People

Additional information
- Time zone: IST (UTC+5:30)
- PIN: 744301
- Telephone code: 03192
- ISO code: IN-AN-00
- Official website: www.and.nic.in
- Literacy: 84.4%
- Avg. summer temperature: 32.0 °C (89.6 °F)
- Avg. winter temperature: 28.0 °C (82.4 °F)
- Sex ratio: ♂/♀
- Census Code: 35.638.0002.645033
- Official Languages: Hindi, English, Tamil; Car (regional)

Paira is an island in the Nicobar district of Andaman and Nicobar Islands, India.

== Administration ==
The island belongs to the township of Nancowry of Teressa Taluk.

== Geography ==
The island is a part of the Nicobar Islands chain, located in the northeast Indian Ocean between the Bay of Bengal and the Andaman Sea. It is located 0.75 km (0.47 mi) NNW of Cape Maud of Tillanchong Island.

== Image gallery ==
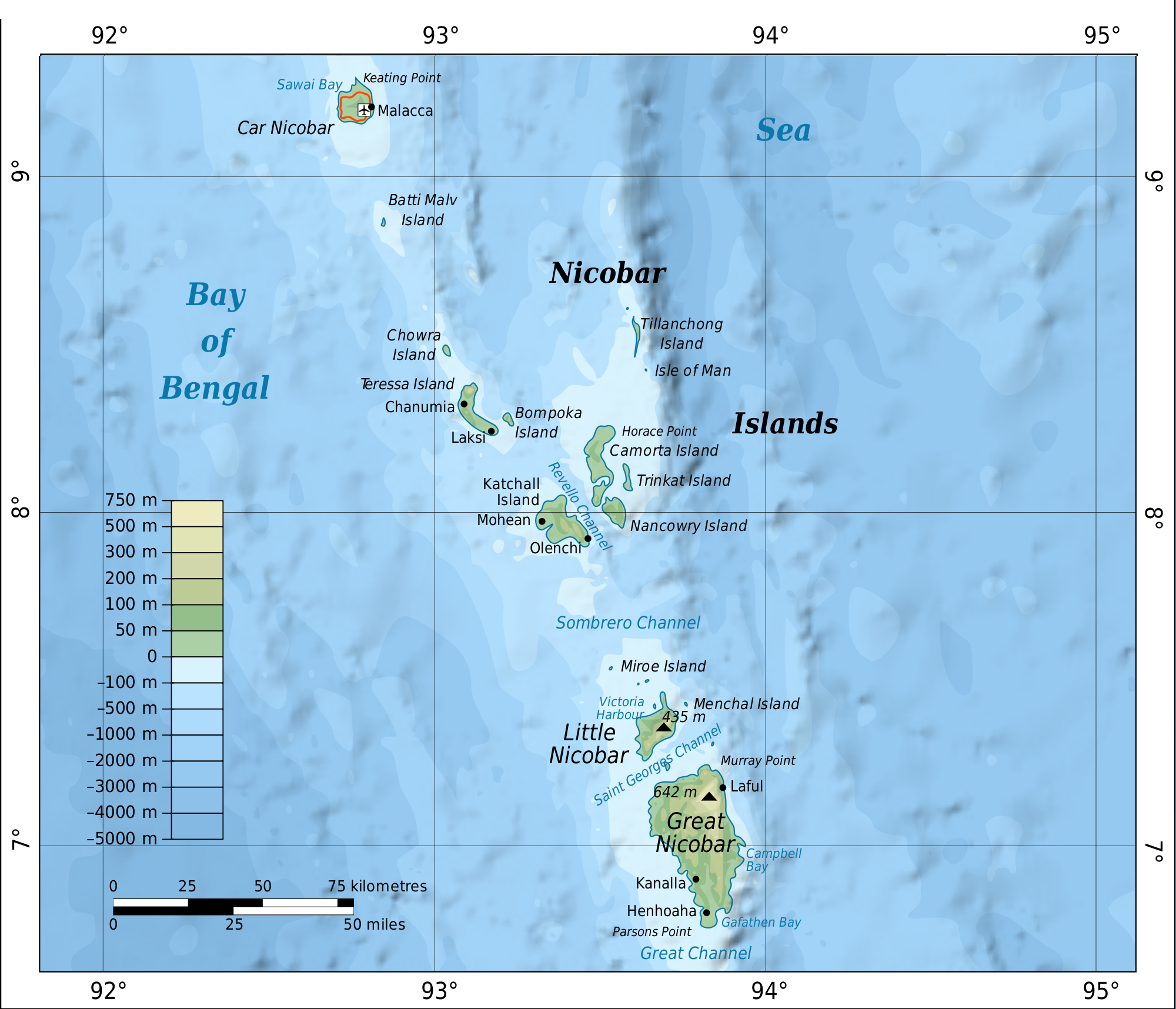
Map

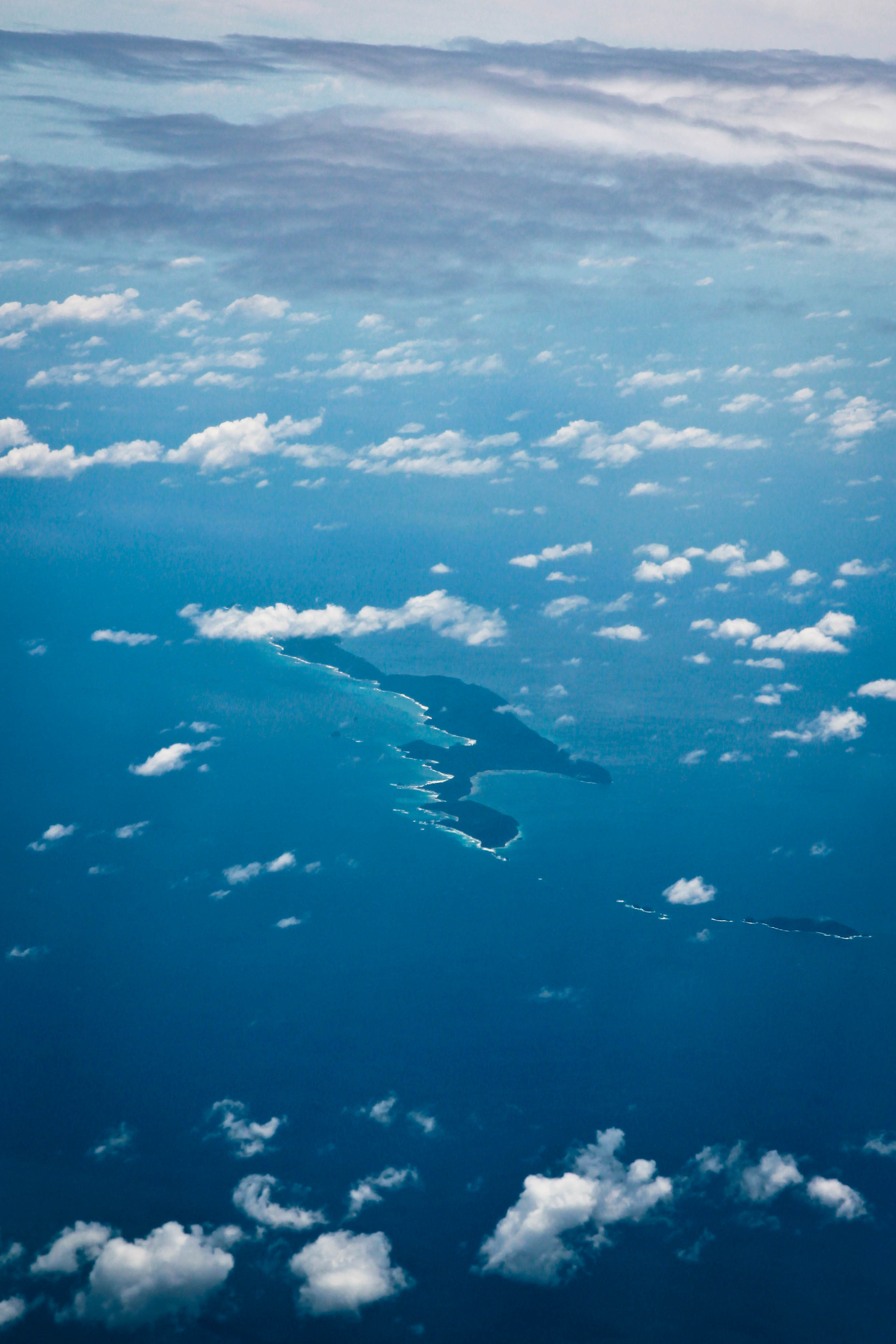
Photo Aerial
