= T93 =

T93 may refer to:

- AB Los Roques (T-93), a landing craft of the Venezuelan Navy
- INS Tihayu (T93), a patrol vessel of the Indian Navy
- T93 Gun Motor Carriage
- T-93 mine, an anti-tank mine
- T93 sniper rifle
