= Man Island =

Man Island may refer to:

- Man Island (Bahamas)
- Man Island (Andaman and Nicobar Islands)
- Mann Island, Liverpool, England

== See also ==
- Isle of Man
