= T62 =

T62 may refer to:

- T-62, a Soviet tank
- Hunter T 62, a British-built trainer aircraft
- INS Tillanchang (T62), a patrol vessel of the Indian Navy
- Solar T62, an American gas turbine engine
- T62 (classification), an IPC para-athletics classification for athletes with limb differences
- Type 62, Chinese light tank often mistakenly called T-62
