= Man Island (Nicobar Islands) =

Uninhabited island in Nicobar Islands

Nickname: Laouk
- Location within Andaman and Nicobar Islands Location within Bay of Bengal

Geography
- Location: Bay of Bengal
- Coordinates: 8.39°N 93.65°E
- Archipelago: Nicobar Islands
- Adjacent to: Indian Ocean
- Total islands: 1
- Major islands: Man
- Area: 0.37 km^{2} (0.14 sq mi)
- Length: 1.3 km (0.81 mi)
- Width: 0.5 km (0.31 mi)
- Coastline: 3.9 km (2.42 mi)
- Highest elevation: 111 m (364 ft)
- Highest point: Man Rock

Administration
- India
- District: Nicobar
- Island group: Nicobar Islands
- Subdivisions of India: Nancowry Subdivision
- Taluk: Teressa tehsil

Demographics
- Population: 0 (2011)
- Pop. density: 0/km^{2} (0/sq mi)
- Ethnic groups: Hindu, Nicobarese People

Additional information
- Time zone: IST (UTC+5:30)
- PIN: 744301
- Telephone code: 03192
- ISO code: IN-AN-00
- Official website: www.and.nic.in
- Literacy: 84.4%
- Avg. summer temperature: 32.0 °C (89.6 °F)
- Avg. winter temperature: 28.0 °C (82.4 °F)
- Sex ratio: ♂/♀
- Census Code: 35.638.0002.645033
- Official Languages: Hindi, English, Tamil; Car (regional)

Man is an uninhabited island in the Nicobar district of Andaman and Nicobar Islands, India.

== Administration ==
The island belongs to the township of Nancowry of Teressa Taluk.

== Geography ==
The island is a part of the Nicobar Islands chain, located in the northeast Indian Ocean between the Bay of Bengal and the Andaman Sea. It is located 4 km (2.5 mi) SSE of Cape Winifred of Tillangchong island.

== Image gallery ==
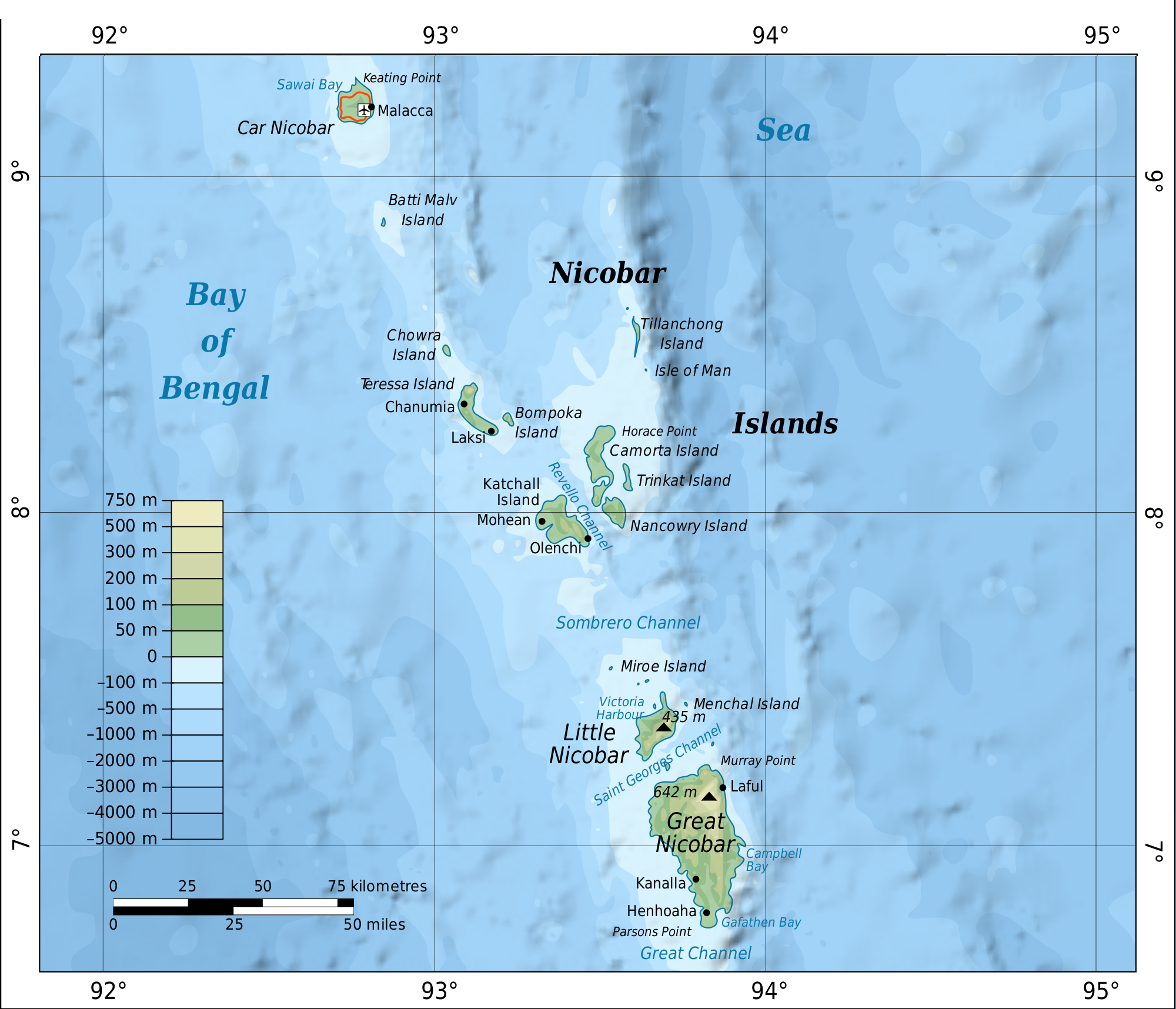
Map

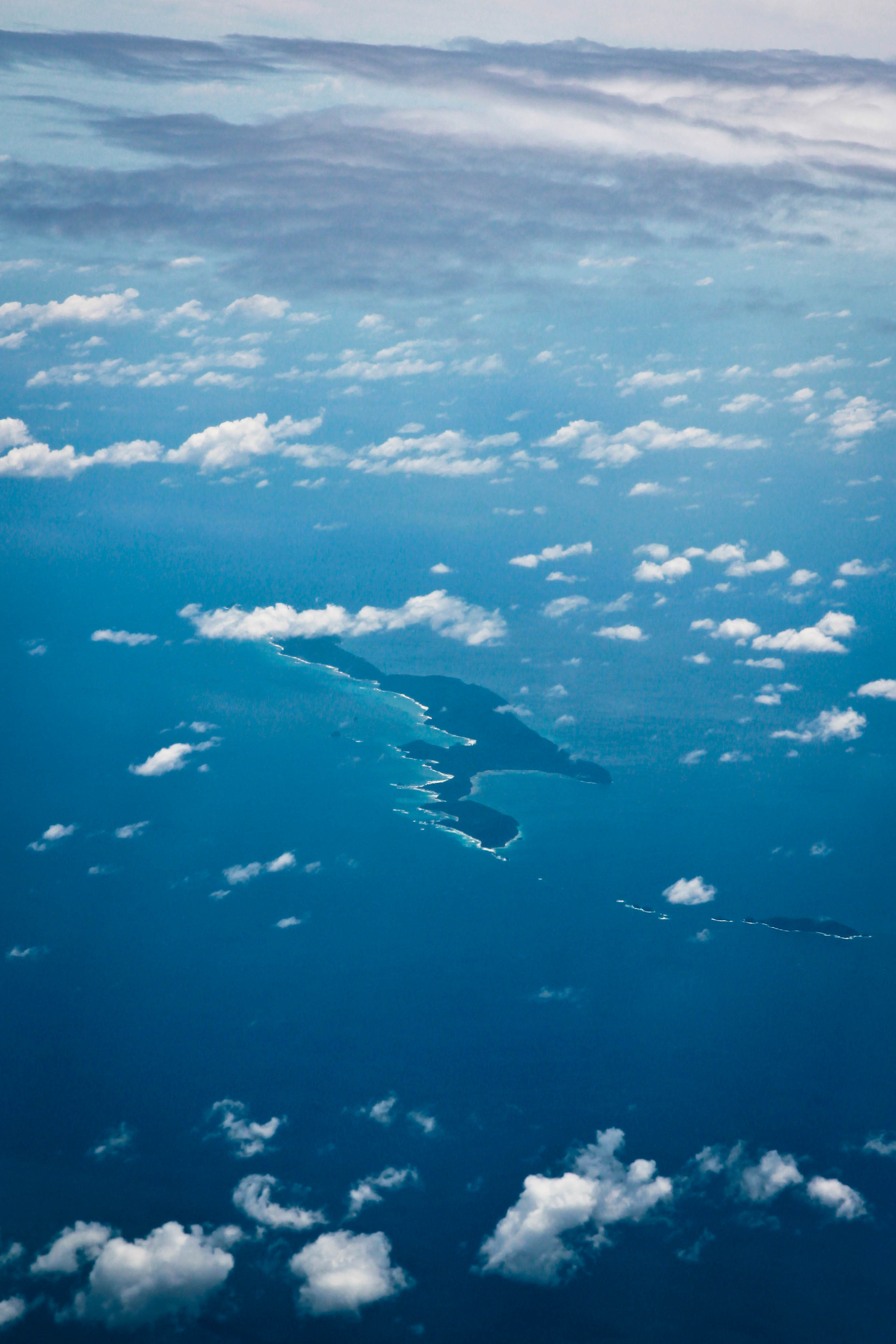
Photo Aerial. The large one in the centre is Tillangchong; Man is the small one below on the right.
