= T64 =

T64 may refer to:

- T-64, a Soviet tank
- General Electric T64, a turboshaft engine
- INS Tarmugli (T64), a patrol boat of the Indian Navy
- T64 (classification), an IPC para-athletics classification for athletes with limb differences
