= Military ranks of Seychelles =

The Military ranks of Seychelles are the military insignia used by the Seychelles People's Defence Force.

== Commissioned officer ranks ==
The rank insignia of commissioned officers.

Rank group	General / flag officers		Senior officers			Junior officers
Seychelles Army
Seychelles Army	Major general (Note: Introduced December 2024)	Brigadier general	Colonel	Lieutenant colonel	Major	Captain	Lieutenant	Second lieutenant
Seychelles Coast Guard
Seychelles Coast Guard	Major general (Note: Introduced December 2024)	Brigadier general	Colonel	Lieutenant colonel	Major	Captain	Lieutenant	Second lieutenant
Seychelles Air Force
Seychelles Air Force	Major general (Note: Introduced December 2024)	Brigadier general	Colonel	Lieutenant colonel	Major	Captain	Lieutenant	Second lieutenant
Rank group	General / flag officers		Senior officers			Junior officers

=== Student officer ranks ===
Rank group	Student officer
Seychelles Army
Seychelles Army	Officer cadet
Seychelles Coast Guard
Seychelles Coast Guard	Officer cadet
Seychelles Air Force
Seychelles Air Force	Officer cadet

== Other ranks ==
The rank insignia of non-commissioned officers and enlisted personnel.

Rank group	Senior NCOs				Junior NCOs		Enlisted
Seychelles Army							No insignia
Seychelles Army	Warrant officer class 1	Warrant officer class 2	Staff sergeant	Sergeant	Corporal	Lance corporal	Private (or equivalent)
Seychelles Coast Guard							No insignia
Seychelles Coast Guard	Warrant officer class 1	Warrant officer class 2	Staff sergeant	Sergeant	Corporal	Lance corporal	Private (or equivalent)
Seychelles Air Force
Seychelles Air Force	Warrant officer class 1	Warrant officer class 2	Staff sergeant	Sergeant	Corporal	Lance corporal	Private (or equivalent)
Rank group	Senior NCOs				Junior NCOs		Enlisted

== Historic ranks ==
Rank group	General / flag officers
Seychelles Army (2000―2022)
Seychelles Coast Guard (2000―2022)
Seychelles Air Force (2000―2022)
	Brigadier
