= INS Tarmugli (2023) =

Indian patrol vessel

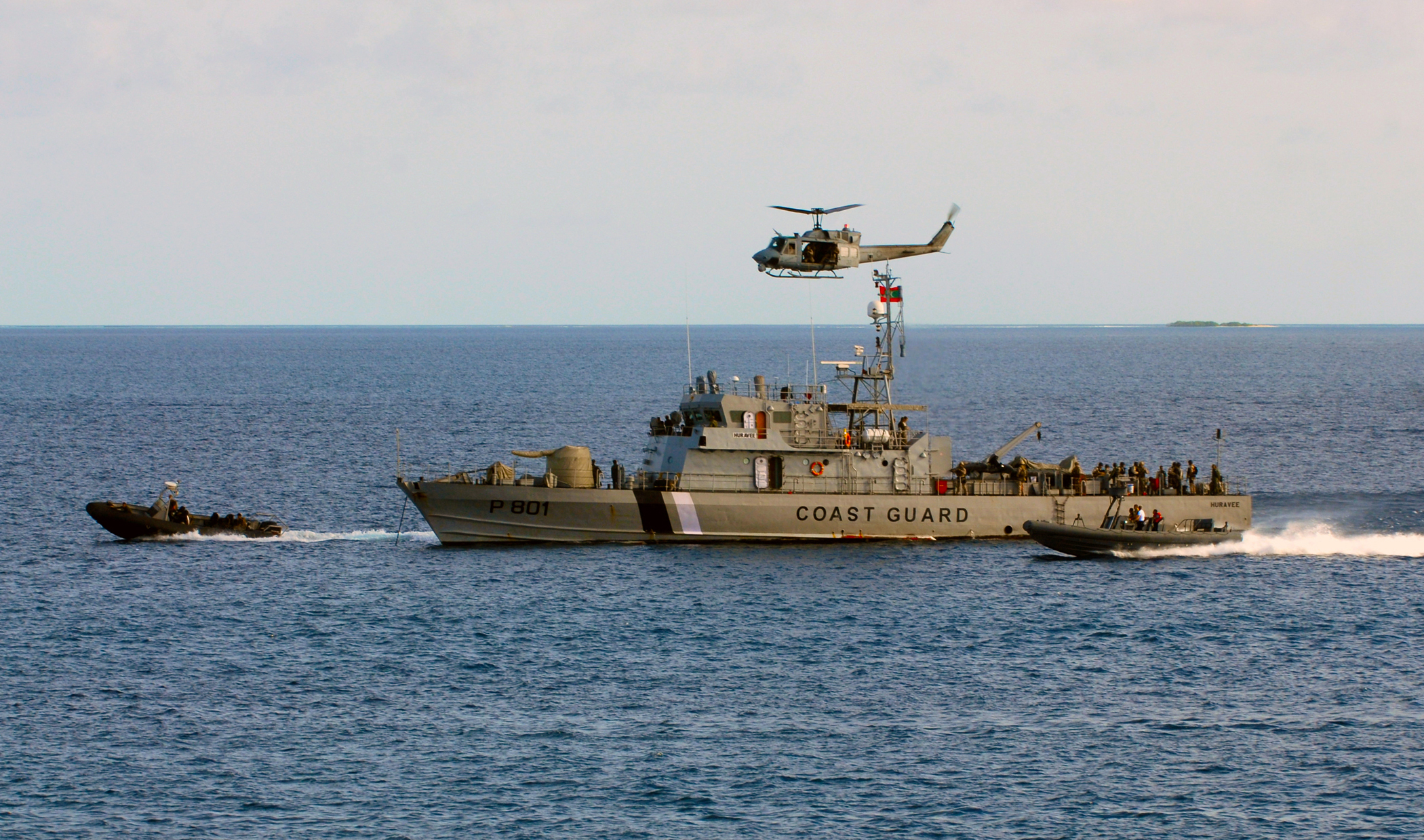
- CGS Huravee during an exercise

History

India
- Name: INS Tillanchang
- Namesake: Tillanchang
- Builder: Garden Reach Shipbuilders and Engineers
- Commissioned: 17 March 2001
- Identification: T62
- Fate: Transferred to Maldives Coast Guard on 16 April 2006

Maldives
- Name: MCGS Huravee
- Commissioned: 16 April 2006
- Decommissioned: 2 May 2023
- Fate: Transferred back to India

India
- Name: INS Tarmugli
- Namesake: Tarmugli Island and ex-INS Tarmugli (T91)
- Commissioned: 14 December 2023
- Status: Recommissioned after refit

General characteristics
- Class & type: Trinkat-class fast attack craft
- Displacement: 260 tons (full load)
- Length: 46 m (150 ft 11 in)
- Beam: 7.5 m (24 ft 7 in)
- Draft: 3.9 m (12 ft 10 in)
- Propulsion: 2 × MTU engines, 3,500 hp (2,600 kW) each; 3 × 80 kW diesel generators
- Speed: 30 knots (56 km/h; 35 mph)
- Range: 2,000 nmi (3,700 km; 2,300 mi) at 12 knots (22 km/h; 14 mph)
- Complement: 33 including 4 officers
- Armament: 1 × 2A42 Medak 30 mm gun

INS Tarmugli, formerly MCGS Huravee and originally INS Tillanchang, a Trinkat-class fast attack craft of the Indian Navy. The vessel was designed and constructed by Garden Reach Shipbuilders & Engineers in Kolkata, West Bengal.

== Service history ==
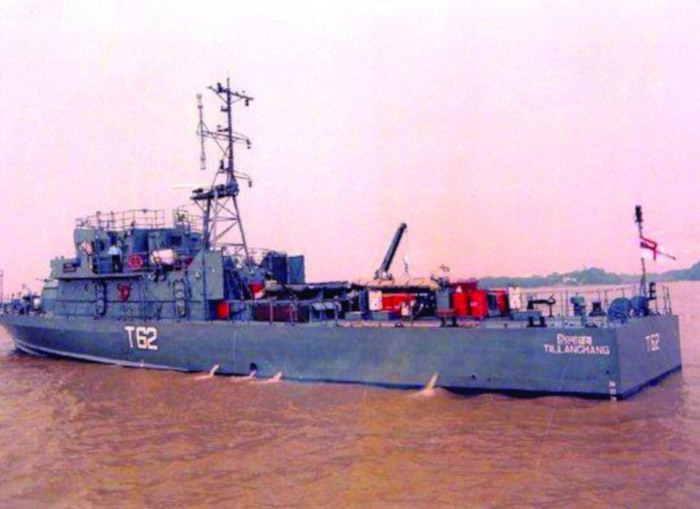
The then INS Tillanchang (T62) in service with the Indian Navy

Tillanchang was named after Tillangchong Island sometimes also called Tillanchang and was commissioned into the Indian Navy on 17 March 2001. She was transferred to the Maldivian Coast Guard on 16 April 2006 as MCGS Huravee. As part of the transfer, technical and material assistance was provided by the Indian Navy for a period of three years. The Indian Navy also stationed a team of personnel for a preliminary period and on-the-job training of the Maldivian crew. Huravee was successfully refitted at Visakhapatnam Naval Dockyard in November 2018. The refit was an initiative by Indian Navy to boost its diplomatic outreach to friendly foreign navies in the Indian Ocean Region.

In Maldivian service, the Huravee was replaced by a newer INS Tarmugli (T91) in May 2023, and the former INS Tillanchang was transferred back to India. After inspections, the decision was taken to refit and recommission the older patrol vessel. The former Tillanchang was recommissioned into the Indian Navy as INS Tarmugli in memory of the patrol vessel donated to the Maldives as the newer MCGS Huravee.
