= INS Tihayu =

Indian patrol vessel

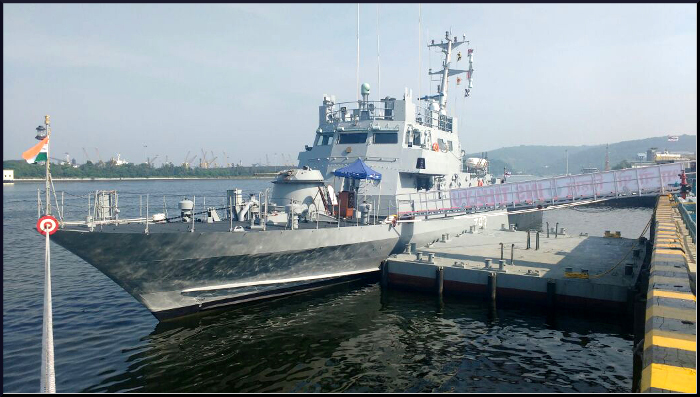
- Tihayu (T93).

History

India
- Name: INS Tihayu (T93)
- Operator: Indian Navy
- Builder: Garden Reach Shipbuilders & Engineers
- Yard number: 2111
- Launched: 30 June 2015
- Commissioned: 19 October 2016
- Home port: Visakhapatnam
- Identification: MMSI number: 419001103; Callsign: AWON
- Motto: Swift and Sure
- Status: Active

General characteristics
- Class & type: Car Nicobar-class
- Type: Fast attack craft
- Displacement: 325 tons
- Length: 48.9 m (160 ft)
- Beam: 7.5 m
- Draft: 4 m (13 ft)
- Speed: 14 knots (26 km/h)
- Endurance: 2,000 nautical miles (3,700 km)
- Complement: 45 (4 officer 41 enlisted)
- Armament: 1 × CRN-91 30mm autocannon; Igla SA-18 SAM; 2 × 12.7mm HMGs; ASW capability

INS Tihayu (T93) is a fast attack craft of the Car Nicobar class in the Indian Navy and the third ship in the series of four Follow On Water Jet Fast Attack Craft (FOWJFAC). Named after Tihayu island of Nicobar archipelago the ship can have an additional package of about 11 machine guns of different variants. The ship equipped with enhanced firepower is capable of operating in shallow waters at high speed. Suited for extended coastal and offshore surveillance and patrol, production of the Car Nicobar-class ships by GRSE was fast-tracked after the 2008 Mumbai terror attacks. She participated at the International Fleet Review 2026 held at Visakapatanam.
