= New Water Jet Fast Attack Craft =

Class of Indian naval vessels

Class overview
- Name: NWJFAC class
- Builders: Garden Reach Shipbuilders & Engineers
- Operators: Indian Navy (Planned)
- Preceded by: Car Nicobar class
- Planned: 31

General characteristics
- Type: Fast attack craft
- Displacement: 325 t (320 long tons; 358 short tons)
- Length: 55 m (180 ft 5 in)
- Beam: 7.7 m (25 ft 3 in)
- Draught: 2.2 m (7 ft 3 in)
- Propulsion: 3 × MTU 16V 4000 M90 diesel engines, 11,238 PS (8,266 kW); 3 × Hamilton HM811 waterjets
- Speed: Maximum: >35 knts; Cruise: 20 knts
- Range: 2,000 nmi (3,700 km; 2,300 mi) at 13 kn (24 km/h; 15 mph)
- Complement: 4 officers, 25 sailors
- Armament: 1 × Naval Surface Gun 30mm Naval Surface Gun (30mm) autocannon; 8 × Nagastra-1 canister based.; 64 × Bhargavastra anti drone system; 2 × 12.7 mm HMGs

New Water Jet Fast Attack Craft (NWJFAC) are a planned fast attack craft for the Indian Navy. Under this programme the Indian Navy intends to acquire a class of thirty one attack craft that are intended feature advanced stealth features like a low radar cross section (RCS), infrared, acoustic and magnetic signatures

Defence Acquisition Council (DAC) approved the procurement of NWJFAC on 3 December 2024. The vessels will perform multiple tasks like low intensity maritime operations, surveillance, patrol, and search and rescue (SAR) operations near the coast. Additionally, the vessels van also participate in Anti-Piracy missions in and around island territories. The ships will be constructed by Garden Reach Shipbuilders & Engineers (GRSE), Kolkata. A new naval base will be built at Haldia in West Bengal to support FIC and NWJFAC operations in the Bay of Bengal.

== See also ==
- Future of the Indian Navy
