= Kalasi =

- village
- Location in Andaman and Nicobar Islands, India Kalasi (India)
- Coordinates: 8.288489°N 93.108882°E
- Country: India
- State: Andaman and Nicobar Islands
- District: Nicobar
- Tehsil: Nancowry

Population (2011)
  - Total: 335
- Time zone: UTC+5:30 (IST)
- Census code: 645043

Kalasi is a village on Teressa Island in the Nicobar district of Andaman and Nicobar Islands, India. It is located in the Nancowry tehsil.

The island is mentioned in Kollywood movie Thupparivaalan as native place of the mysterious antagonist.

== Demographics ==
According to the 2011 census of India, Kalasi has 78 households. The effective literacy rate (i.e. the literacy rate of population excluding children aged 6 and below) is 66.79%.

Demographics (2011 Census)
	Total	Male	Female
Population	335	172	163
Children aged below 6 years	55	32	23
Scheduled caste	0	0	0
Scheduled tribe	335	172	163
Literates	187	105	82
Workers (all)	85	79	6
Main workers (total)	12	9	3
Main workers: Cultivators	0	0	0
Main workers: Agricultural labourers	0	0	0
Main workers: Household industry workers	0	0	0
Main workers: Other	12	9	3
Marginal workers (total)	73	70	3
Marginal workers: Cultivators	0	0	0
Marginal workers: Agricultural labourers	0	0	0
Marginal workers: Household industry workers	0	0	0
Marginal workers: Others	73	70	3
Non-workers	250	93	157
