= PS Constant =

Seychelles Coast Guard patrol vessel

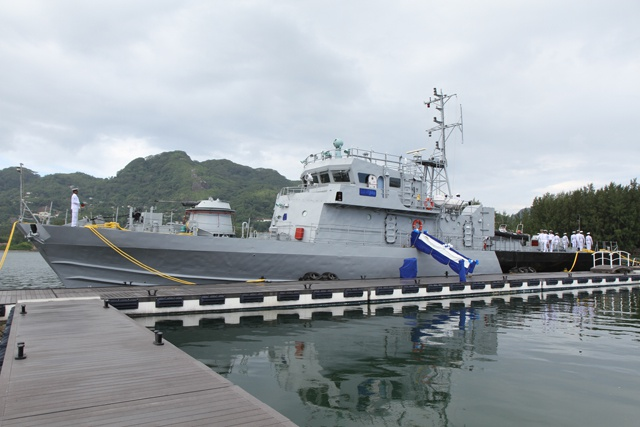
- PS Constant just prior to her commissioning into the Seychelles Coast Guard

History

India
- Name: INS Tarasa
- Namesake: Tarasa Dwip
- Builder: Garden Reach Shipbuilders & Engineers
- Commissioned: 24 August 2001
- Identification: T63
- Fate: Transferred to Seychelles Coast Guard on 7 November 2014

Seychelles
- Name: PS Constant
- Commissioned: 7 November 2014
- Status: Active

General characteristics
- Class & type: Trinkat-class fast attack craft
- Displacement: 319 long tons (324 t)
- Speed: 28 knots (52 km/h)

PS Constant is a Trinkat-class fast attack craft owned and operated by the Seychelles Coast Guard. She was formerly operated by the Indian Navy as INS Tarasa (T63). India, as well as the United Arab Emirates, have helped equip the Seychelles Coast Guard with patrol vessels. India and the UAE helped equip the tiny Seychelles with these patrol vessels due to its strategic location, very near the area off the Horn of Africa that is notorious for pirate attacks.

India's most senior naval officer, Robin Dhowan, traveled to Seychelles, for the official handover. She was the second vessel India turned over to Seychelles. Tarmugli was re-christened PS Topaz when she was transferred in 2005.
