= La Flèche (P32) =

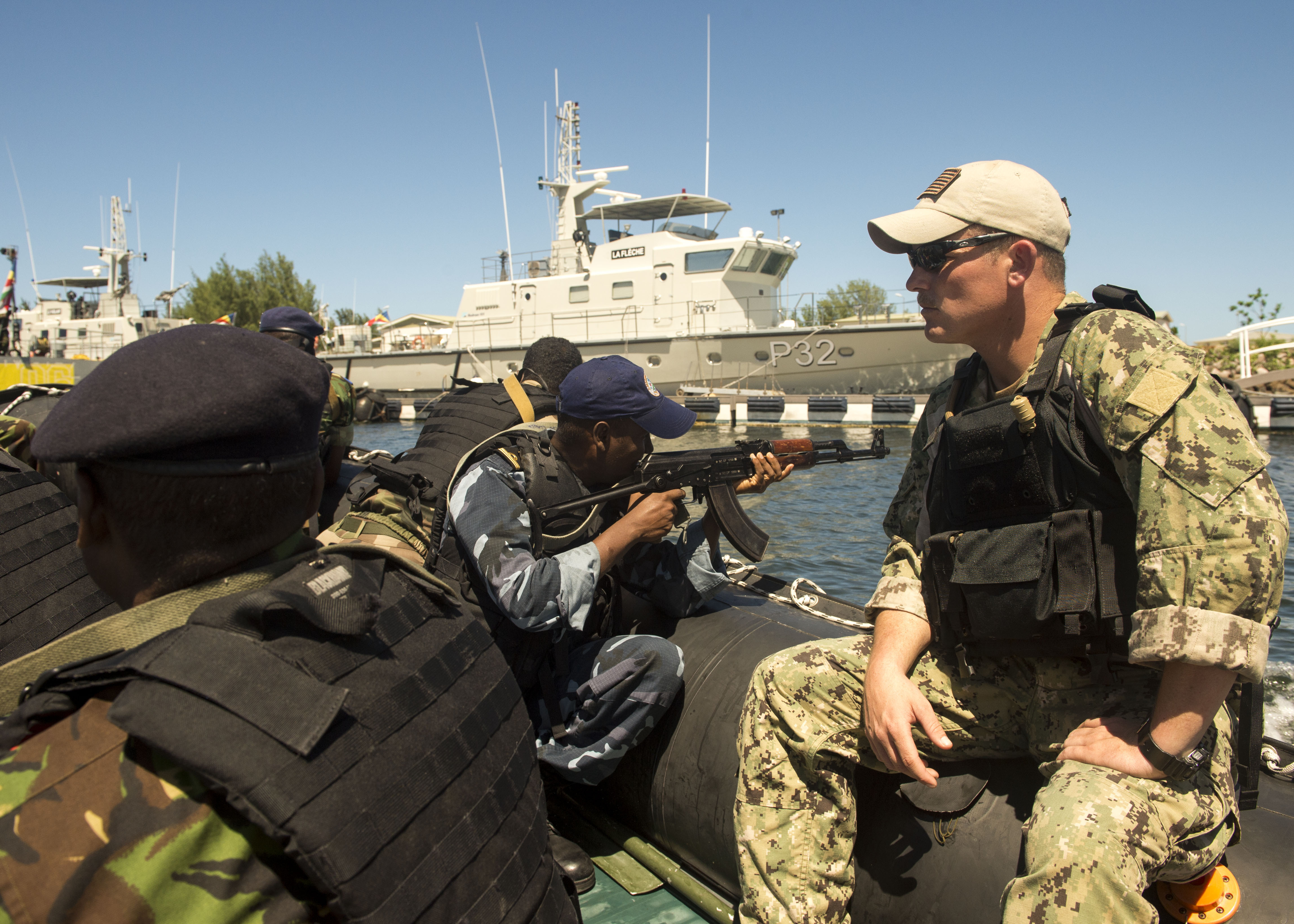
La Flèche

La Flèche (P32) is a 30-metre (98 ft) patrol vessel owned and operated by the Seychelles Coast Guard. La Flèche was donated to Seychelles by the United Arab Emirates, with a sister ship, on April 1, 2011.

Although the Seychelles are a small country, it is located off the Horn of Africa, strategically close to the operation of active pirates. Other Indian Ocean nations see their donations of patrol vessels to Seychelles as a strategic investment in fighting piracy.

Through the Seychelles Coast Guard's employment of La Flèche, and other ships in her small fleet, Seychelles has been able to arrest, try and convict many pirates. In 2013 the UAE paper The National reported that Seychelles was then imprisoning more than 100 convicted pirates.
