= Minyuk =

Minyuk Munak
- village
- Location in Andaman and Nicobar Islands, India Minyuk (India)
- Coordinates: 8.263577°N 93.127963°E
- Country: India
- State: Andaman and Nicobar Islands
- District: Nicobar
- Tehsil: Nancowry

Population (2011)
  - Total: 305
- Time zone: UTC+5:30 (IST)
- Census code: 645041

Minyuk is a village on Teressa Island in the Nicobar district of Andaman and Nicobar Islands, India. It is located in the Nancowry tehsil.

== Demographics ==
According to the 2011 census of India, Minyuk has 76 households. The effective literacy rate (i.e. the literacy rate of population excluding children aged 6 and below) is 67.57%.

Demographics (2011 Census)
| | Total | Male | Female |
|---|---|---|---|
| Population | 305 | 165 | 140 |
| Children aged below 6 years | 46 | 26 | 20 |
| Scheduled caste | 0 | 0 | 0 |
| Scheduled tribe | 298 | 158 | 140 |
| Literates | 175 | 109 | 66 |
| Workers (all) | 65 | 60 | 5 |
| Main workers (total) | 14 | 10 | 4 |
| Main workers: Cultivators | 0 | 0 | 0 |
| Main workers: Agricultural labourers | 0 | 0 | 0 |
| Main workers: Household industry workers | 0 | 0 | 0 |
| Main workers: Other | 14 | 10 | 4 |
| Marginal workers (total) | 51 | 50 | 1 |
| Marginal workers: Cultivators | 0 | 0 | 0 |
| Marginal workers: Agricultural labourers | 0 | 0 | 0 |
| Marginal workers: Household industry workers | 0 | 0 | 0 |
| Marginal workers: Others | 51 | 50 | 1 |
| Non-workers | 240 | 105 | 135 |
