= Magnetic proximity fuze =

A magnetic proximity fuse was patented by P.J. Eliomarkakis, (United States Patent US2434551 of January 13, 1948) although similar devices had been in service for nearly a decade and the magnetic pistol had been used in torpedoes since 1917. It is a type of proximity fuze that initiates a detonator in a piece of ordnance such as a land mine, naval mine, depth charge, or shell when the fuse's magnetic equilibrium is upset by a magnetic object such as a tank or a submarine.

Magnetic field sensors and movement sensors inside the ordnance detect changes to the terrestrial magnetic field of the ordnance caused by another ferromagnetic object. A signal processor inside the ordnance receives the signals from the magnetic field sensors and movement sensors and activates the detonator which will then detonate the explosives within the ordnance.

== Examples ==
Examples of pieces of ordnance that employ a magnetic fuze include:

- the Chinese Chen-2 bottom mine
- the Egyptian T-93 mine

== See also ==
- Proximity sensor
- Reed switch
- Artillery fuze
- Missile
- Proximity fuze
- Magnetic pistol
