= Action of 30 March 2010 =

Naval battle between Seychelles Coast Guard and Somali pirates

- Part of Piracy in Somalia, Operation Ocean Shield, Operation Enduring Freedom - Horn of Africa
Date	30 March 2010
Location	25 nautical miles (46 km) off Somalia, Indian Ocean
Result	Seychellois victory

Belligerents
Seychelles	Somali pirates

Commanders and leaders
(Seychelles) Simon Laurecine	Unknown

Strength
Patrol vessel Topaz	1 armed dhow 1 trawler 2 skiffs

Casualties and losses
none	1 armed dhow sunk 1 trawler sunk 1 skiff sunk 9 captured
- 1 civilian wounded

The action of 30 March 2010 was a naval battle involving a patrol boat of the Seychelles Coast Guard and two groups of Somali pirate vessels. The encounter resulted in the freeing of twenty-seven hostages held by the pirates.

== Background ==
Topaz, a Trinkat-class patrol vessel of the Seychelles Coast Guard, was sent out on an anti-piracy patrol during late March as part of a new initiative by the Government of Seychelles to combat the steady increase in Somali piracy.

== Battle ==
On 30 April, Seychelles Coast Guard patrol vessel Topaz approached a captured vessel where nine Somali pirates were holding six Seychellois and 21 Iranian sailors hostage, and were attempting to reach the Somali coast. A Somali translator aboard Topaz sent audio calls urging the immediate release of the hostages, but the pirates ignored these demands, and continued towards the coast of Somalia even when warning shots were fired by Topaz. Seychellois President James Michel gave the order to prevent the pirates from reaching the Somali coastline at all cost.

The pirates opened fire on Topaz with rocket-propelled grenades, which Topaz evaded. Topaz then opened fire on the dhow's engine with 12.7 mm machine guns, firing a total of 10,000 rounds. The engine caught fire, forcing all of the pirates and hostages to jump overboard. Topaz then rescued all of the hostages and arrested the Somali pirates. While en route back to the Seychelles, Topaz was approached by Somali pirates in a naval trawler and two skiffs. The pirates opened fire on Topaz, after which Topaz returned fire. The pirate trawler caught fire and exploded after being hit, and a skiff was also sunk by the return fire, while the last skiff managed to escape. Topaz then proceeded to Mahé.

== Aftermath ==
The operation was successfully completed with no casualties to either combatant, though one Iranian seaman, a hostage of the pirates, suffered a gunshot wound to the arm.

Topaz arrived in Port Victoria on 1 April 2010, and was met by the families of hostages. The nine pirates being held aboard Topaz were disembarked and taken into custody by the Seychelles Police.
