= Bengali, Nancowry =

Bengali
- village
- Location in Andaman and Nicobar Islands, India Bengali (India)
- Coordinates: 8.319968°N 93.113935°E
- Country: India
- State: Andaman and Nicobar Islands
- District: Nicobar
- Tehsil: Nancowry

Population (2011)
  - Total: 354
- Time zone: UTC+5:30 (IST)
- Census code: 645044

Bengali is a village on Teressa Island in the Nicobar district of Andaman and Nicobar Islands, India. It is located in the Nancowry tehsil.

== Demographics ==
According to the 2011 census of India, Bengali has 150 households. The effective literacy rate (i.e. the literacy rate of population excluding children aged 6 and below) is 75.08%.

Demographics (2011 Census)
	Total	Male	Female
Population	354	220	134
Children aged below 6 years	29	20	9
Scheduled caste	0	0	0
Scheduled tribe	230	122	108
Literates	244	167	77
Workers (all)	166	152	14
Main workers (total)	138	124	14
Main workers: Cultivators	0	0	0
Main workers: Agricultural labourers	0	0	0
Main workers: Household industry workers	0	0	0
Main workers: Other	138	124	14
Marginal workers (total)	28	28	0
Marginal workers: Cultivators	0	0	0
Marginal workers: Agricultural labourers	0	0	0
Marginal workers: Household industry workers	6	6	0
Marginal workers: Others	22	22	0
Non-workers	188	68	120
