= T-93 mine =

- Type: Scatterable anti-tank mine
- Place of origin: Egypt

Specifications
- Mass: 2 kg
- Height: 120 mm
- Diameter: 105 mm

The T-93 is an Egyptian scatterable anti-tank mine similar in appearance to the German AT-2 scatterable mine. It can be dispensed from launchers deployed on the ground or mounted on vehicles which can hold as many as 600 mines. The mine is cylindrical with twelve spring-loaded legs folded up against the sides of its body during storage. After the mine is dispensed and strikes the ground, the legs spring open, pointing the mine upright.

The mine is triggered by a magnetic fuze when an appropriate target is detected, detonating the Misznay Schardin effect warhead, which produces a self-forging fragment capable of penetrating up to 80 millimeters of armor.
