= CRN 91 naval gun =

CRN-91 naval gun
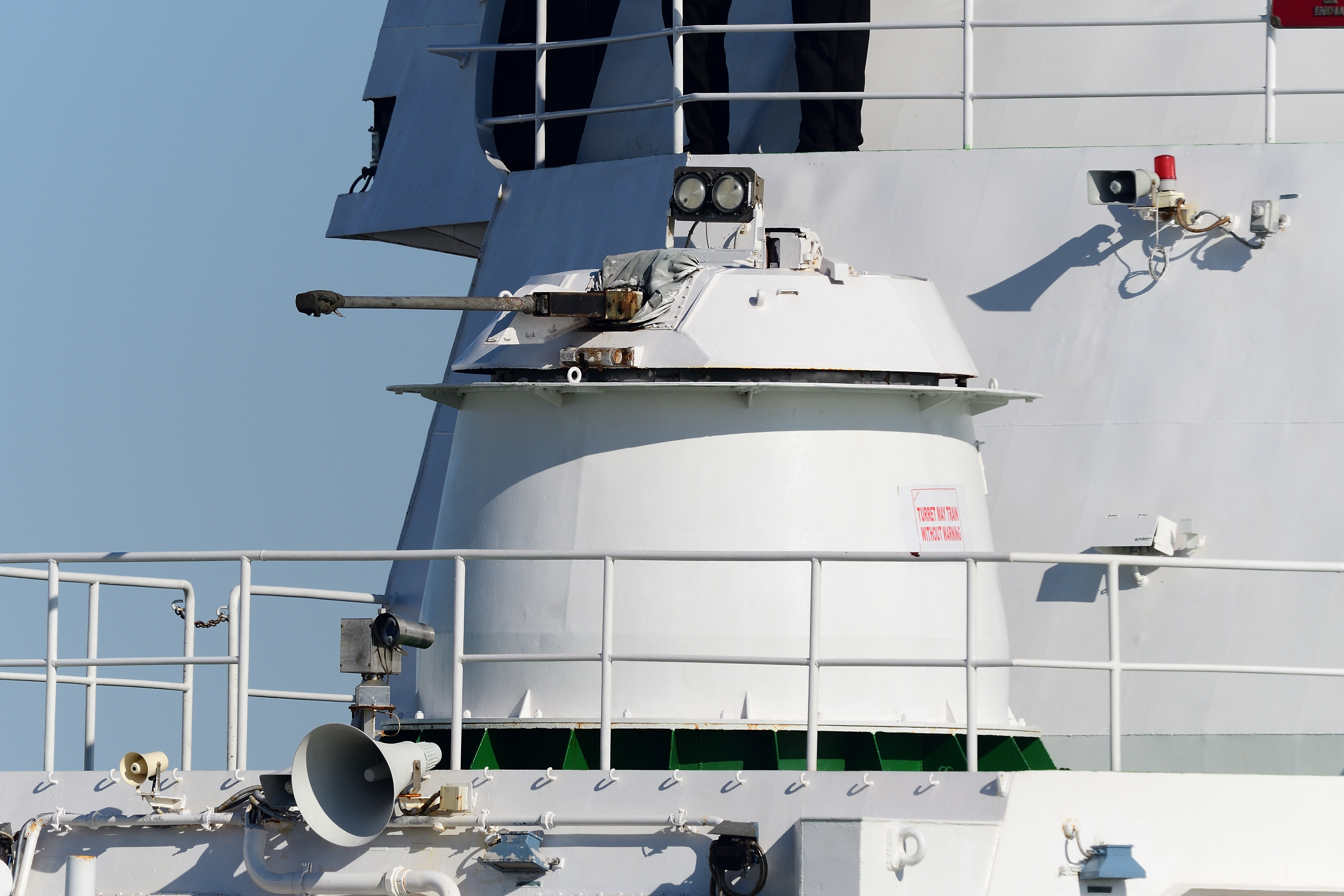
- CRN-91 on ICGS Shaunak
- Type: Autocannon
- Place of origin: India

Service history
- In service: 1995
- Used by: India; Mauritius; Maldives; Seychelles; Sri Lanka

Production history
- Manufacturer: Armoured Vehicles Nigam
- Produced: 1995

Specifications
- Mass: 115 kilograms (254 lb)
- Length: 3.027 m (9 ft 11.2 in)
- Cartridge: 30×165
- Caliber: 30 mm
- Barrels: 1
- Action: Gas-operated
- Rate of fire: 200 to 300 rds/min (low); 550 rds/min (high)
- Effective firing range: 4,000 metres (4,400 yd)
- Feed system: Twin feed

The Close Range Naval-91 is a naval version of the Medak 30mm automatic gun installed on the Sarath Infantry fighting vehicle, a variant of the Russian (originally Soviet) BMP-2 manufactured in India under license by the AVANI. The Medak gun itself is based on the Russian Shipunov 2A42 30 mm automatic cannon.

== Description ==
The CRN-91 Naval gun has a dual-feed mechanism that allows it to switch between armour-piercing tracer and high-explosive incendiary & fragmentation tracer projectiles that are electrically primed, which means that the primer is activated through an electric current rather than being struck by a firing pin and igniting the propellant. A BPK 2-42 electro optical sight manufactured by Bharat Electronics Limited (BEL) directs the cannon, and the complete unit is gyrostabilized in the pitch and yaw axes. The sight may function both during the day and at night. It can also be operated remotely.

CRN 91 gun is a flexible and effective weapon intended for use against armored targets and air targets flying at low altitudes. The range is 2 km for armor-piercing tracer projectile and 4 km for HE projectiles. The cannon can hit slow moving objects in air at a height of 2,000 meters and has a total range of 2,500 meters.

The CRN-91 Naval gun is not a sophisticated weapon and has limited anti-ship capability but is a combat proven weapon and its operational cost is very low. It is suited for vessels primarily designed for peacetime patrolling and policing, particularly for anti-insurgency, anti-smuggling, anti-pirate and maritime surveillance of exclusive economic zones (EEZ).

It has been installed on many warships such as:

- Samudra Class Pollution Control Vessel
- Landing Ship, Tank
  - Shardul class landing ship
  - Kumbhir class landing ship
- Pollution control vessel
  - GSL-class pollution control vessel
- Offshore Patrol Vessel
  - Vikram-class offshore patrol vessel (2017)
  - Samarth-class offshore patrol vessel
  - Vishwast-class offshore patrol vessel
  - Sankalp-class offshore patrol vessel
  - Vikram-class offshore patrol vessel (1983)
- Patrol vessels
  - Aadesh Class Fast Patrol Vessel
  - Rajshree-class patrol vessel
  - Rani Abbakka-class patrol vessel
  - Sarojini Naidu-class patrol vessel
  - Bangaram-class patrol vessel
  - Trinkat-class patrol vessel
- Fast attack craft
  - Car Nicobar class fast attack craft
  - 5-Series-class fast attack craft (Myanmar Navy)

== Combat use ==
=== Action of 30 March 2010 ===
The Topaz, a Trinkat class patrol vessel of the Seychelles Coast Guard, was sent out on an anti-piracy patrol during late March as part of a new initiative by the Government of Seychelles to combat the steady increase in Somali piracy. The Topaz was a former Indian Navy ship which was given to the Seychelles Coast Guard to help them combat piracy.

On 30 April, the Topaz approached a captured vessel where nine Somali pirates were holding six Seychellois and 21 Iranian sailors hostage, and were attempting to reach the Somali coast. A Somali translator aboard the Topaz sent audio calls urging the immediate release of the hostages, but the pirates ignored these demands, and continued towards the coast of Somalia even when warning shots were fired by the Topaz. Seychellois President James Michel gave the order to prevent the pirates from reaching the Somali coastline at all cost.

The pirates opened fire on the Topaz with rocket-propelled grenades, which the Topaz evaded. The Topaz then opened fire on the dhow's engine with 12.7mm machine guns, firing a total of 100 rounds. The engine caught fire, forcing all of the pirates and hostages to jump overboard. The Topaz then rescued all of the hostages and arrested the Somali pirates. While en route back to the Seychelles, the Topaz was approached by Somali pirates in a naval trawler and two skiffs. The pirates opened fire on the Topaz, after which the Topaz returned fire. The pirate trawler caught fire and exploded after being hit, and a skiff was also sunk by the return fire, while the last skiff managed to escape. The Topaz then proceeded to Mahé.

=== Battle off Minicoy Island ===
In January 2011, as a part of Operation Island Watch, INS Cankarso and INS Kalpeni were deployed on anti-piracy patrol to the west of the Lakshadweep archipelago. On 28 January, INS Cankarso responded to a mayday call from a container ship. Upon reaching the site, she saw Somali pirate skiffs being hoisted aboard a hijacked Thai fishing trawler, Prantalay 14 which was being used as a pirate mother ship.

INS Cankarso ordered the pirated ship to stop for inspection. The pirates on board fired on Cankarso as they tried to flee west towards Somalia. Cankarso returned the fire, which hit some of the fuel drums stored on Prantalay 14's deck for refueling the skiffs. The mother ship was set ablaze and sank as Kalpeni and Indian Coast Guard patrol vessel ICGS Sankalp reached the site. 15 pirates were arrested, and the 20 crew of the fishing trawler were all rescued unharmed.

In another operation on 13 March 2011, an Indian Navy patrol aircraft spotted the Mozambique-registered fishing vessel Vega 5 when responding to another vessel reporting a pirate attack. Beira-based Vega 5, owned by Spanish company Pescamar Lda, had been captured on 27 December 2010 by pirates who were demanding US$1.8 million in ransom. INS Kalpeni intercepted the pirated ship about 1,100 kilometres (680 mi) off Kochi on India's west coast. A fire broke out on the vessel when Kalpeni returned fire after being fired upon by the pirates. 61 pirates were rescued and arrested after they jumped into the Arabian Sea to escape the fire. The crew of Kalpeni put out the fire on board the Vega 5, rescued her 13 crew members and escorted her to Mumbai. Rocket-propelled grenades and over 80 assault rifles were recovered from the pirates.

INS Kalpeni and INS Cankarso are Car Nicobar class fast attack craft equipped with a CRN-91 30 mm Automatic gun.

== Specification ==
- Caliber: 30 mm
- Diameter: 2700 mm
- Height: 2100 mm
- Gun feed: Double belt separate

Rate of Fire

- Sustained: 200 to 300 rounds per min
- Maximum: 550 rounds per min

Range

- Armour-piercing tracer projectile: 2000 m
- HE incendiary and fragmentation tracer projectile: 4000 m

Sight

Type: BPK 2–42

Day system

- Magnification: 6X
- Field of view at least: 10°
- Periscope height: 221 mm

Night system

- Magnification at least: 5.5X
- Field of view at least: 6°40′
- Periscope height: 248 mm
