= INS Tillanchang (T92) =

Indian patrol vessel

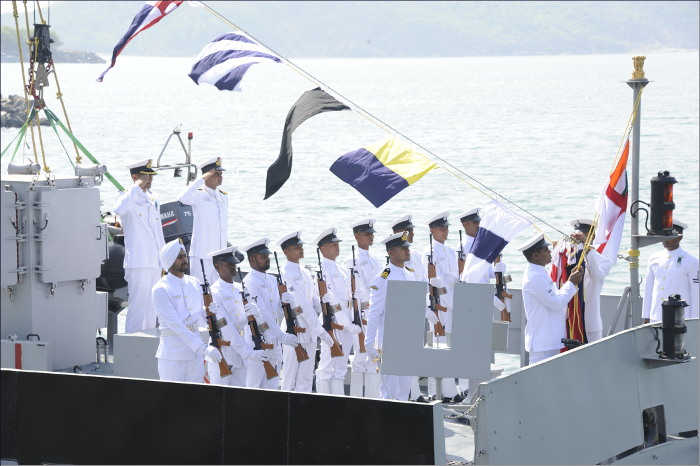
- INS Tillanchang commissioning ceremony at Karwar

History

India
- Name: Tillanchang
- Namesake: Tillanchang island
- Builder: Garden Reach Shipbuilders & Engineers
- Yard number: 2110
- Launched: 30 June 2015
- Commissioned: 9 March 2017
- Home port: Karwar
- Identification: Pennant number: T92; MMSI number: 419001102; Callsign: AWOM
- Status: Active

General characteristics
- Class & type: Car Nicobar-class fast attack craft
- Speed: 35 knots (65 km/h; 40 mph)
- Endurance: 2,000 nmi (3,700 km; 2,300 mi)

INS Tillanchang (T92) is a fast attack craft of the Car Nicobar class in the Indian Navy. The ship was commissioned on 9 March 2017, at INS Kadamba the naval base at Karwar.
