= MNDF Coast Guard =

Maldivian Coast Guard
- Founded: 1 January 1980
- Country: Maldives
- Type: Coast Guard
- Part of: Maldives National Defence Force

Commanders
- Commandant: Brigadier General Mohamed Saleem
- Principal Director: Lt Col Mohamed Rizmy Waleed
- Command Sergeant Major: Ahmed Shaheer

Insignia
- Flag

- Racing stripe

The Maldivian Coast Guard is the maritime arm of the Maldives National Defence Force (MNDF). Because the Maldives does not have a navy, the MNDF Coast Guard functions as the armed maritime force of the nation with a charter to contribute to national defence and by and large to respond to issues related to the maritime security of the nation. Therefore, the Coast Guard is documented as the custodian of the Maldives Maritime Domain. Maritime security is a constituent ingredient of the national security in a maritime nation such as the Maldives and its significance is best understood when one perceives the island or the archipelagic nature of the country.

After the new government took power in 2008, the Coast Guard has been the highest priority of the defense sector in Maldives. Four Coast Guard squadrons are deployed in the southern, central, and northern regions of Maldives, and a Strategic Reserve has been established at the capital, Male'.

== Missions ==
- Defending the nation and its territorial integrity
- Protecting the territorial waters and securing the resources of the Exclusive Economic Zone
- Safeguarding the marine environment and Coastal Area
- Enforcing the Maritime Law
- Assisting the people and conducting search and rescue missions
- Responding to national emergencies and crises
- Providing support and mobility to other services of the MNDF

== History ==
The roots of the MNDF Coast Guard lie in the 1570s Kalhuoffummi, as its insignia symbolizes, the legendary sailing boat used by the heroic Mohamed Thakurufaanu and his allies in his guerrilla battle to free the country from the invasion of the Portuguese.

Until the establishment of the modern Coast Guard in 1980, the small speed boat section of the National Security Service (NSS) was the maritime security service in the Maldives and it lays claim on being the Maldives oldest continuous seagoing force. The Coast Guard was established as a separate wing of the defence forces on 1 January 1980 with the late Colonel Hussain Fulhu as its first Commanding Officer.

The Maldivian Coast Guard Air Elements was formed as the air wing of the Coast Guard in 1978, with one HAL Do 228 donated by India. In 2003, India donated two HAL Dhruvs.

== Roles ==
The MNDF Coast Guard has a dual role, with the strategic military application settling within the parameters of national defence and territorial integrity as the primary task while its secondary role is aimed at relatively non-military aspects of maritime security which covers areas such as maritime terrorism, transnational crime, drug trafficking through maritime routes, smuggling, piracy and so forth. In times of peace, Coast Guard is popular as a force of goodwill due to its endeavours in building bridges of friendship with the public. It reaches out to people and save their lives by intensely conducting well planned and executed Search and Rescue (SAR) operations at sea and assume other humanitarian roles in crises when the public is in need.

Whilst most other military services of the MNDF are either at standby or training for the unseen hostile actions, the Coast Guard is deployed every day. With decentralized Coast Guard squadrons placed at Area Commands in North, Central and South of Maldives and a strategic reserve at the capital Male' under the new Strategic Defence Directive, and much responsibility placed on even the most junior sailors, the Coast Guard is frequently lauded for its quick responsiveness and adaptability in a broad range of tasks and emergencies.

== Strength ==
Its capabilities were strengthened and modernised after the 3 November 1988 attack by People's Liberation Organisation of Tamil Eelam terrorists.

After the 1988 incident, 6 British patrol craft were acquired. These were 4 Tracker II class, 1 Dagger class and 1 Cheverton class ships.

In 1998, 3 vessels were built at the Colombo Dockyard. These are 2 Coastal Surveillance Vessels of 24 meters, CGS Ghazee and CGS Iskandhar and 1 Fast Landing Craft of 20 metres length. The CGS also acquired a 17-meter fire fighting vessel.

After the 2004 tsunami, the need for larger vessels with off-shore patrol capabilities were given a high priority. The Indian Navy donated a Trinkat class patrol vessel of 46 metres length in April 2006, commissioned as CGS Huravee and is commanded by Lieutenant Mohamed Jamshad.

The Maldives Coast Guard has acquired two additional large offshore patrol craft, constructed at the Colombo Dockyard, Sri Lanka. These vessels are 42m and 35m in length. The 35m patrol craft was brought to Male on 21 April 2007 and commissioned as CGS Shaheedh Ali, commanded by Lieutenant Moahmed Fahumy. Lt Mohamed Fahumy was previously the executive officer of CGS Shaheed Ali.The 42m vessel was brought to Male on 11 November 2007 and commissioned as CGS Ghaazee. It is commanded by Lieutenant Ahmed Fathih.

The Ghazee was renamed CGS Nooradheen after the Sultan who founded the Maldivian armed forces on 21 April 1892. In addition to these, the Coast Guard operates some small in-shore patrol craft.

In May 2023, the Indian Navy donated one Car Nicobar-class patrol vessel. The ship was named MCGS Huravee, and will replace the older MCGS Huravee, donated back in 2006.

In June 2025 the Australian Minister for Defence Richard Marles announced that Australia will provide a Guardian-class patrol boat to the MCG.

=== Notable ships of the CGS fleet ===
- 3 x Tracker Mk II class Patrol Boat 1978–1979
  - 142 Kuredhi
  - 151 Midhili
  - 133 Kaani
- 1 x Tracker Class Patrol Boat
  - 106 Nirolhu 1987–2019
- 1 x 17m class Patrol Boat 1980
  - 115 Burevi 1988
- 1 x Dagger class Patrol Boat 1982
  - 124 Funa
- 1 x Cheverton class
- 2 x Ultra Fast Attack Craft
  - CGS Ghazee 42m 2002–present – now CGS Nooradheen
  - CGS Iskandhar 1999–present
- 1 x Hamilton Jet Model HM422 Fast Landing Craft (WLCM) 2000–present
  - L-301
- 1 x 17m fire rescue boat – modified patrol boat
  - E-9 Fire and Rescue
- 1 x Car Nicobar-class patrol vessel
  - MCGS Huravee (formerly INS Tarmugli (T91))
- 1 x 42m Patrol Craft
- 1 x 35m Patrol Craft
  - 'CGS Shaheedh Ali
- several RHIB

== Coast guard operations ==
The MNDF coast guard has been vastly successful in securing after the modernization and expansion of their fleet. Counter-terrorist operations, anti-piracy missions, search and rescue operations as well as humanitarian operations.

The MNDF coast guard has successfully taken down pirate ships illegally entering the EEZ of the Maldives, mostly from Somalia. Almost every year, the coast guard has been able to arrest and apprehend roughly 100–200 pirates and prevent illegal entries into the Maldivian territory in the past years.

== Action of 17 May 2007 ==
On 17 May 2007, a gun running ship that was carrying mortar bombs and guns while illegally intruding the EEZ of the Maldivian territory fired upon a Maldivian fishing vessel. The Maldivian fishing vessel quickly informed the Maldives Coast Guard which resulted in a standoff between the Tamil Tigers' gun runner boat and CGS Huravee of the coast guard. After repetitive attempts to make them surrender with peaceful negotiations, the boat still refused to comply and attempted to take offensive action against the coast guard. With little choice left, the coast guard ship CGS Huravee fired upon the boat and sank it.
