= Teressa Island =

Island in the Nicobar Islands, India

Teressa op
Native name: Luroo
- Location within Andaman and Nicobar Islands

Geography
- Location: Bay of Bengal
- Coordinates: 8.27°N 93.13°E
- Archipelago: Nicobar Islands
- Adjacent to: Indian Ocean
- Total islands: 1
- Major islands: Teressa
- Area: 86.5 km^{2} (33.4 sq mi)
- Length: 5.3 km (3.29 mi)
- Width: 19.6 km (12.18 mi)
- Coastline: 52.8 km (32.81 mi)
- Highest elevation: 250 m (820 ft)

Administration
- India
- District: Nicobar
- Island group: Nicobar Islands
- Subdivisions of India: Nancowry Subdivision
- Largest settlement: Bengali (pop. 400)

Demographics
- Population: 1934 (2014)
- Pop. density: 22.35/km^{2} (57.89/sq mi)
- Ethnic groups: Hindu, Nicobarese

Additional information
- Time zone: IST (UTC+5:30)
- PIN: 744301
- Telephone code: 03192
- ISO code: IN-AN-00
- Official website: www.and.nic.in
- Literacy: 84.4%
- Avg. summer temperature: 32.0 °C (89.6 °F)
- Avg. winter temperature: 28.0 °C (82.4 °F)
- Sex ratio: ♂/♀
- Census Code: 35.638.0002
- Official Languages: Hindi, English, Tamil; Teressa (regional)

Teressa (Teressa language: Luroo, Hindi: तेरेस्सा, also called Tarasa Dwip) is one of the Nicobar Islands, India.

== History ==
When Austria claimed the Nicobar Islands as a colony (1778-1784) on the assumption that Denmark had abandoned its claim (1754/56-1868), they named Teressa after the Austrian Archduchess Maria Theresia. Austria abandoned its earlier claim in 1784.

Extensive damage to the island's flora and fauna occurred following the 2004 Indian Ocean earthquake and tsunami.

== Geography ==
Teressa lies west of the neighboring island of Camorta and northwest of Katchal. The smaller island known as Chowra is to the north and Bompoka lies to the east. The northern portion of the island has elevations reaching 87 meters.

The island has a surface area of 101.26 km^{2}.

== Demography ==
The Indian National Census of 2011 showed the island to have a population of 1,934, and the largest settlements were: Bengali (354), Kalasi (335), and Minyuk (305).

== Administration ==
The island belongs to Teressa-Chowra Taluk of the township of Nancowry.

Other islands in Teressa-Chowra tehsil are: Chowra Island, Bompuka Island, Tillangchong Island and Laouk Island.

== Image gallery ==
Safed Balu Beach

The Safed Balu Beach (white sand beach) is situated at the east opposite to Bampoka Island.

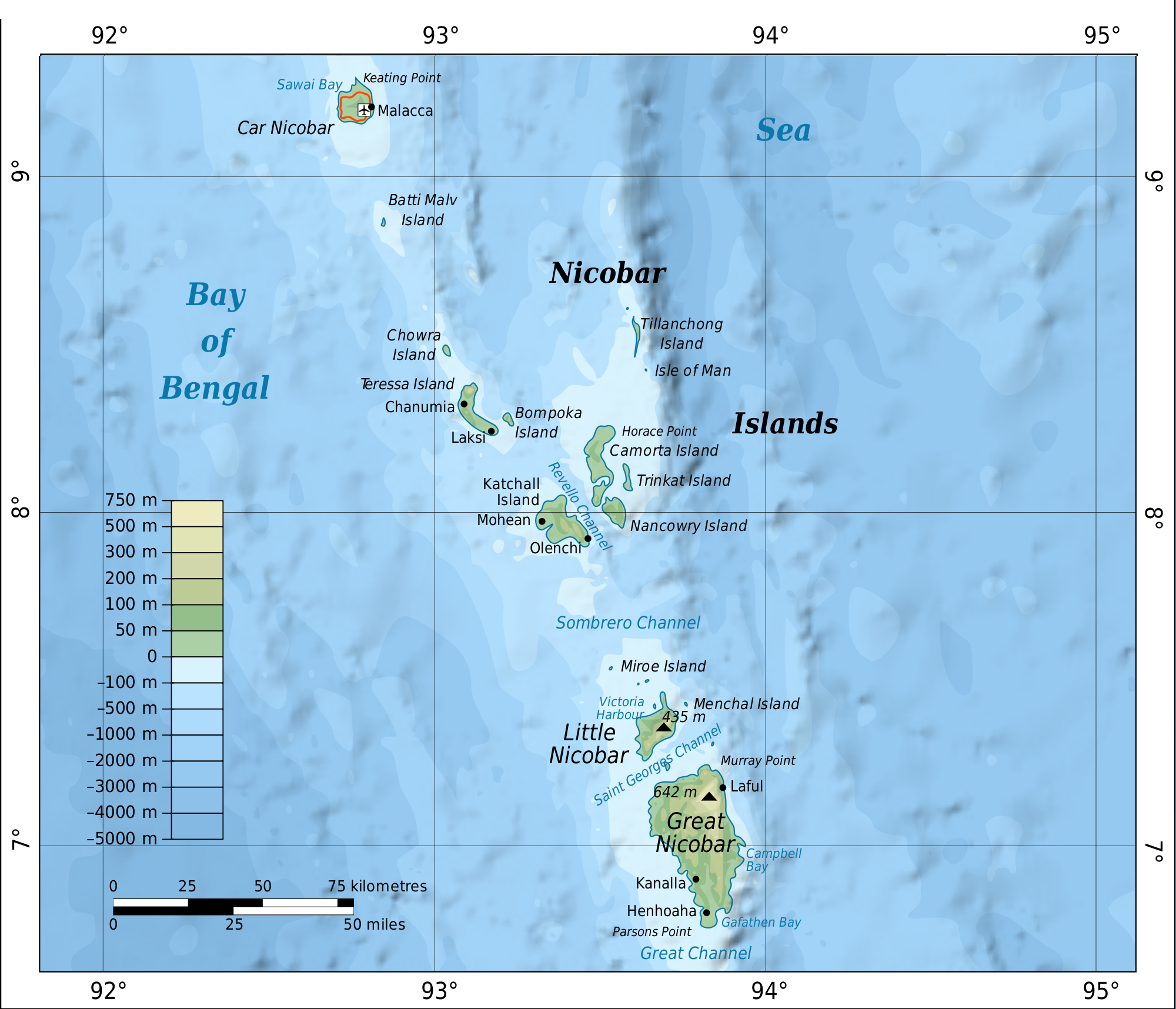
Map of the Nicobar Islands

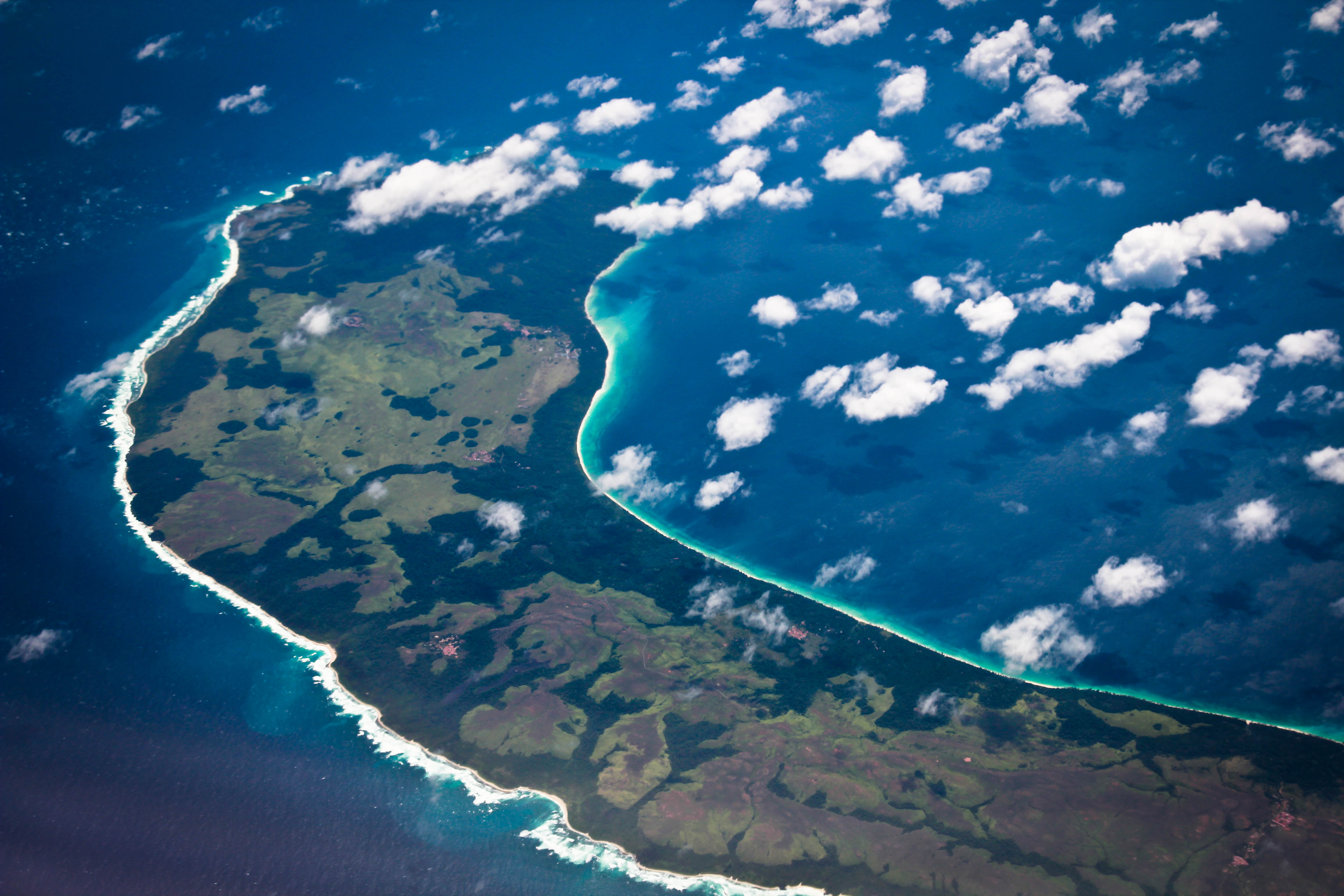
Aerial View

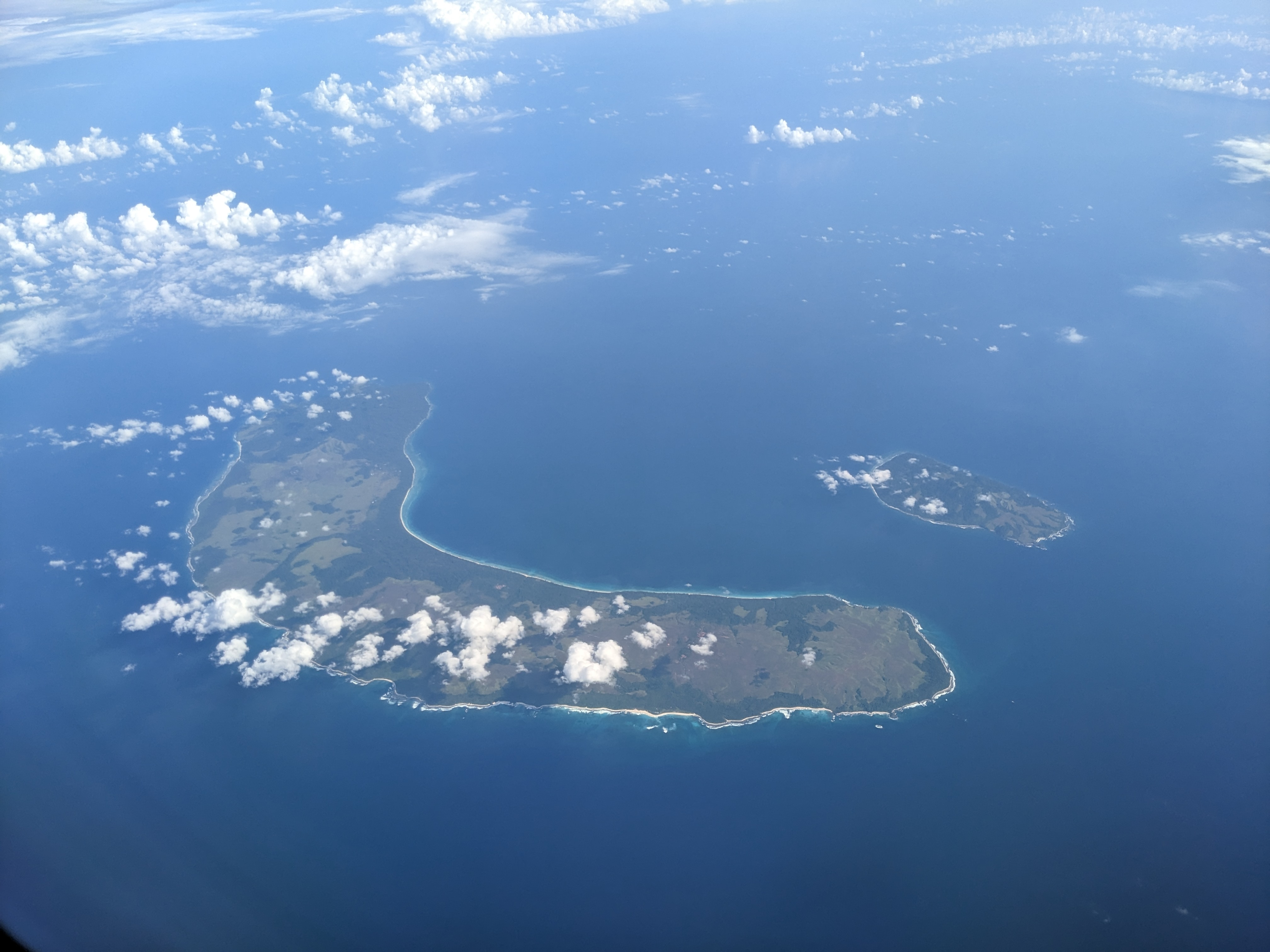
Aerial View in 2023
