= Tillangchong =

Tillangchong Island
- Location within Andaman and Nicobar Islands

Geography
- Location: Bay of Bengal
- Coordinates: 8.50°N 93.63°E
- Archipelago: Nicobar Islands
- Adjacent to: Indian Ocean
- Total islands: 1
- Major islands: Tillangchong
- Area: 14.7 km^{2} (5.7 sq mi)
- Length: 16.5 km (10.25 mi)
- Width: 2 km (1.2 mi)
- Coastline: 46.5 km (28.89 mi)
- Highest elevation: 244 m (801 ft)
- Highest point: Maharani

Administration
- India
- District: Nicobar
- Island group: Nicobar Islands
- Subdivisions of India: Nancowry Subdivision
- Taluk: Teressa tehsil
- Largest settlement: Novara Bay (pop. 38)

Demographics
- Population: 38 (2011)
- Pop. density: 2.58/km^{2} (6.68/sq mi)
- Ethnic groups: Hindu, Nicobarese

Additional information
- Time zone: IST (UTC+5:30)
- PIN: 744301
- Telephone code: 03192
- ISO code: IN-AN-00
- Official website: www.and.nic.in
- Literacy: 84.4%
- Avg. summer temperature: 32.0 °C (89.6 °F)
- Avg. winter temperature: 28.0 °C (82.4 °F)
- Sex ratio: ♂/♀
- Census Code: 35.638.0002.645033
- Official Languages: Hindi, English, Tamil; Car (regional)

Tillangchong, also known as Tillanchang, is an island and a village in the Nicobar district of Andaman and Nicobar Islands, India.

== Administration ==
The island belongs to the Teressa tehsil in Nancowry subdivision.

== Geography ==
The island is a part of the Nicobar Islands chain, located in the northeast Indian Ocean between the Bay of Bengal and the Andaman Sea.

== Flora and fauna ==
The island has the largest surviving populations of the endemic Nicobar megapode (Megapodius nicobariensis), and is a protected sanctuary.

== Demographics ==
At the time of 2011 census, the island was largely uninhabited apart from a police post at Novara Bay, with several Policemen and their families, with the island being held sacred to the Nicobarese people, who visit in one season annually to "...to pray, to feel, and to revere...".

According to the 2011 census of India, Tillang Chong Island has 4 households. The effective literacy rate (i.e. the literacy rate of population excluding children aged 6 and below) is 89.47%.

Demographics (2011 Census)
	Total	Male	Female
Population	38	38	0
Children aged below 6 years	0	0	0
Scheduled caste	0	0	0
Scheduled tribe	5	5	0
Literates	34	34	0
Workers (all)	38	38	0

== Image gallery ==
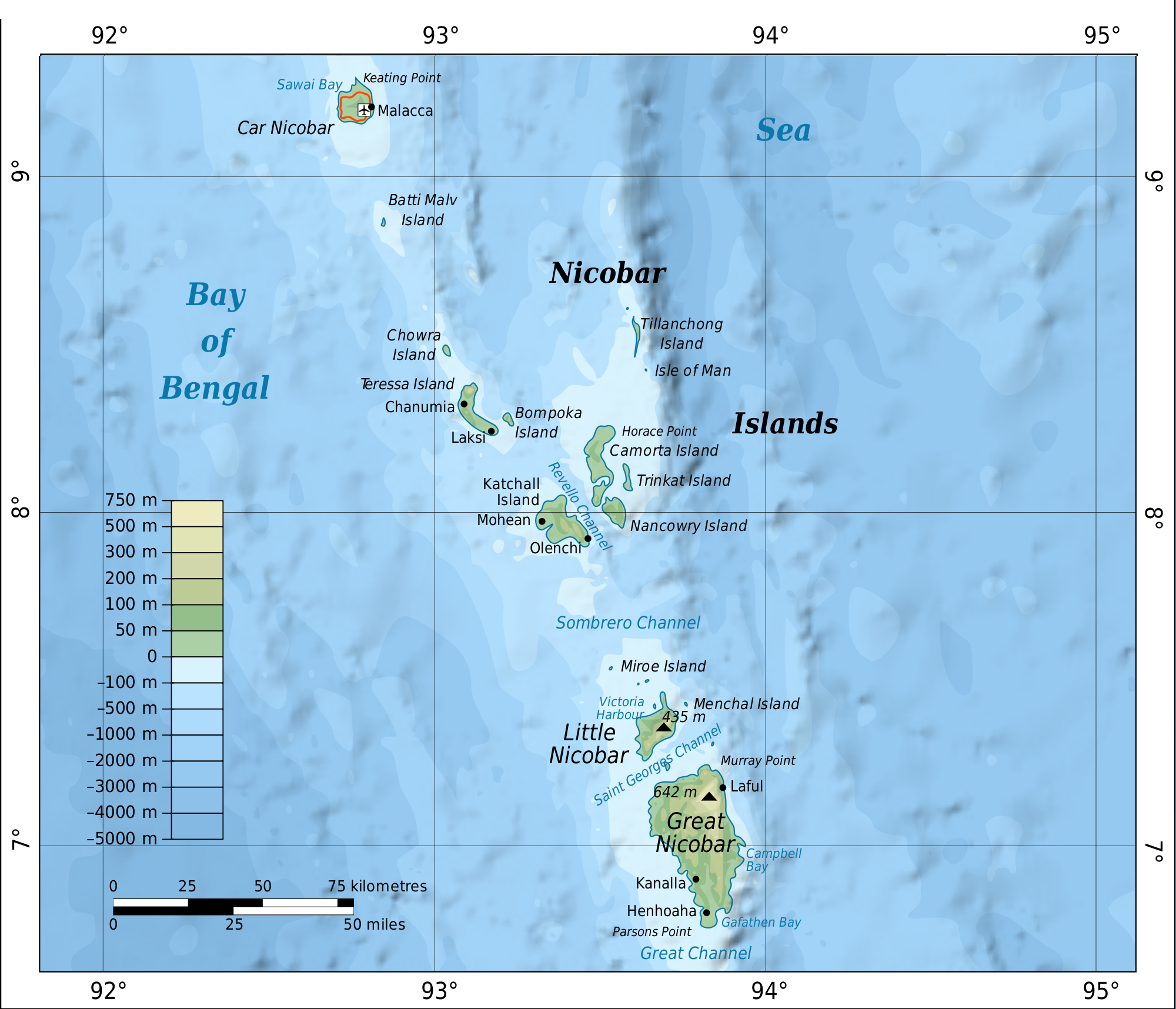
Map

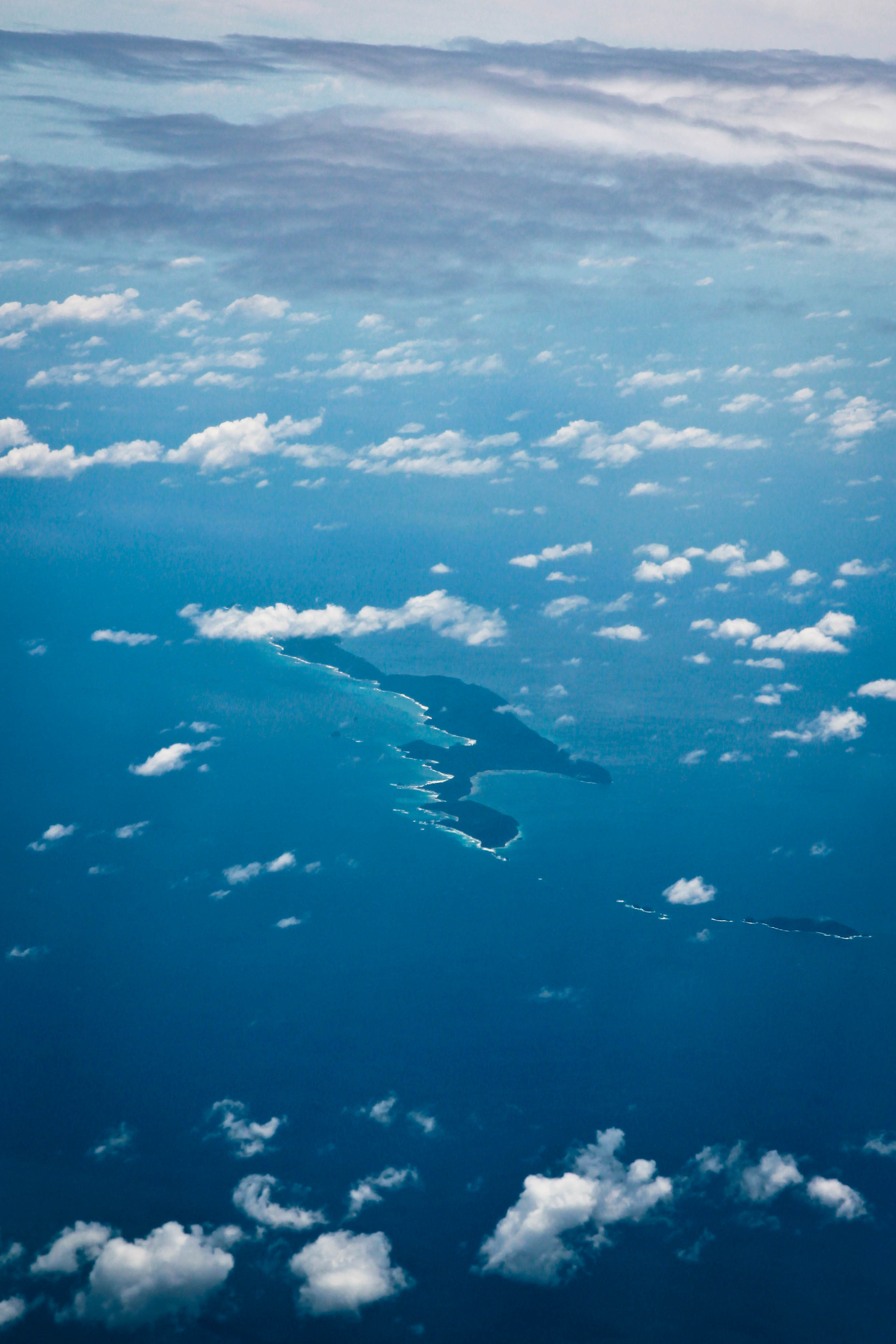
Photo Aerial
