= Trinkat-class fast attack craft =

Indian Navy ship class

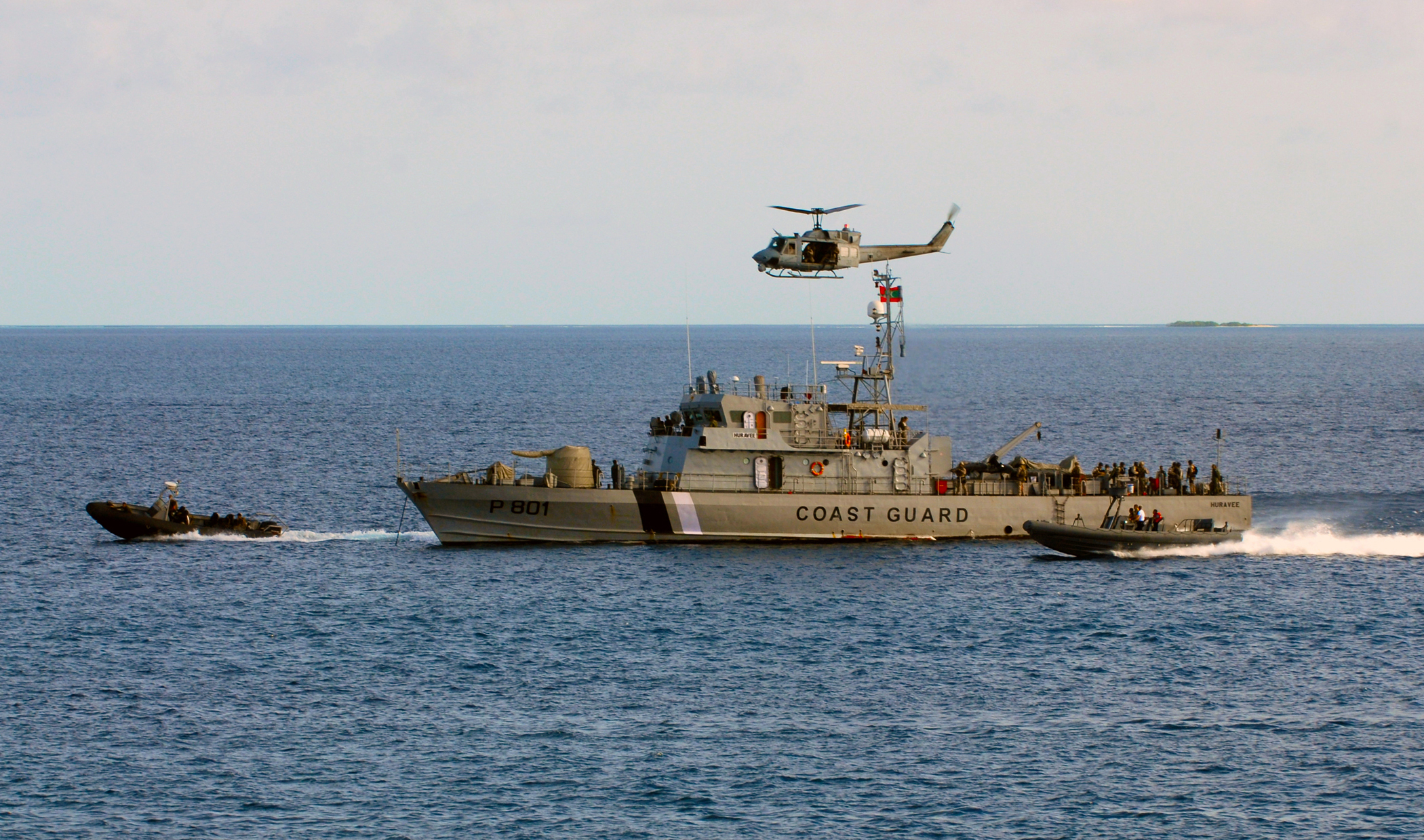
- MCGS Hurawee

Class overview
- Name: Trinkat class
- Builders: Garden Reach Shipbuilders and Engineers
- Operators: Indian Navy; (Maldives) Maldivian Coast Guard (former); Seychelles Coast Guard
- Preceded by: Seaward class
- Succeeded by: Bangaram class
- Planned: 4
- Completed: 4
- Active: 2 Indian Navy; 2 Seychelles Coast Guard

General characteristics
- Type: Fast attack crafts
- Displacement: 260 ton (full load)
- Length: 46 m (151 ft)
- Beam: 7.5 m (25 ft)
- Propulsion: 2 × MTU engines (3,500 hp each); 3 × 80 kW diesel generators
- Speed: 30 kn (56 km/h; 35 mph)
- Complement: 33
- Armament: 1 × 2A42 Medak 30 mm gun

The Trinkat-class fast attack crafts of the Indian Navy were designed and constructed by Garden Reach Shipbuilders and Engineers.

== Role ==
The patrol vessels carry out fisheries protection, anti-poaching, counter-insurgency and search-and-rescue operations in coastal areas and in the exclusive economic zone. The vessels of the "Trinkat" class are named after islands from the Andaman and Nicobar Islands or the Lakshadweep Islands.

Upon the recommissioning of the second ship at Visakhapatnam as Tarmugli, the ship is tasked for coastal surveillance to protect the Offshore Development Area across the Krishna Godavari Basin along the eastern coast of India. The ship is operating under Naval Officer-in-Charge (NOIC) Andhra Pradesh while its commissioning commanding officer is Commander Satpal Singh Sangwan.

== Ships in class ==
Name	Pennant	Homeport	Commissioned	Notes
Indian Navy
Trinkat	T61	Port Blair	28 September 2000	Active
Tarmugli	T62	Visakhapatnam	17 March 2001	Originally commissioned as Tillanchang with the Indian Navy in 2001. Transferred to Maldivian Coast Guard on 16 April 2006, as MCGS Huravee. Decommissioned on 2 May 2023, and transferred back to India. Recommissioned as Tarmugli on 14 December 2023 after refit.
Seychelles Coast Guard
Constant (formerly, Tarasa)	T63		24 August 2001	Transferred on 7 November 2014.
Topaz (formerly, Tarmugli)	T64		4 March 2002	Transferred on 23 February 2005.

== Replacements ==
While the older INS Tarasa and INS Tarmugli were transferred to Seychelles Coast Guard and INS Tillanchang was transferred to Maldivian Coast Guard, newer ships bearing the original names were launched starting in 2016. The new ships have also been designed and constructed by Garden Reach Shipbuilders and Engineers as Car Nicobar-class patrol vessels. The new INS Tarasa (T94), the follow-on water jet fast attack craft was launched in Kolkata on 30 June 2016. The new INS Tillanchang (T92) another water jet-powered fast attack craft was commissioned at Karwar on 9 March 2017. The new INS Tarmugli (T91) was commissioned at Vizag on 23 May 2016. These ships are similar in design and armament to the Trinkat-class ships that were transferred to Maldives and Seychelles, with added capabilities for enhanced endurance.

The newer INS Tarmugli (T91) was donated to the Maldives in May 2023. The older MCGS Huravee (formerly INS Tillanchang) was transferred back to India, and after inspection, was decided to be refitted and recommissioned. Subsequently, on 14 December 2023, the former Tillanchang was recommissioned into the Indian Navy as INS Tarmugli.

== See also ==
- Action of 30 March 2010
- List of active Indian Navy ships
