= Seychelles Coast Guard =

- Active: 1993
- Countries: Seychelles
- Type: Coast guard
- Role: Coastal defence, maritime law
- Engagements: Anti-piracy measures in Somalia; Operation Prosperity Guardian

The Seychelles Coast Guard (SCG) is a branch of the Seychelles People's Defence Force created in 1993. It is a maritime, military, multi-mission service. They acquired responsibility for search and rescue for vessel incidents as well as environmental protection from the Seychelles Port Authority, formerly known as the Port and Marine Services Division.

Although Seychelles is a small country, it is located off the Horn of Africa, strategically close to the operation of notorious pirates. Sri Lanka, China, United Arab Emirates and India have made strategic donations of patrol vessels to the Seychelles.

== History ==
Through the Seychelles Coast Guard's employment of her small fleet, Seychelles has been able to arrest, try, and convict many pirates. In the action of 30 March 2010, the PS Topaz successfully eliminated a small Somali pirate contingent. In January 2011, the Seychelles Coast Guard and Royal Danish Navy unsuccessfully attempted to recapture a German freighter from pirates. On 20 April 2011, the Seychellois patrol boats La Fleche and Andromache engaged Somali pirates in combat for over an hour and a half before recapturing the Seychellois fishing vessel Gloria which had been taken by the pirates two days earlier. In 2013 the UAE paper The National reported that Seychelles was imprisoning more than 100 convicted pirates at the time.

In May 2011, the SCG helped to protect the privacy of The Duke and Duchess of Cambridge during their honeymoon on the North Island. At the end of their stay, the couple invited several members of the Coast Guard ashore to personally thank them for their efforts.

In 2023 the country is involved in Operation Prosperity Guardian.

== Equipment ==
Patrol ships are named after local fishing banks and natural features.

=== Current vessels ===
Name	Quantity	Image	Length	Notes	Origin	Ref.
Saya De Malha	–		41 m (134 ft 6 in)	SCG's first auxiliary vessel	Portugal	
Thorpe	–		15 m (49 ft 3 in)	Wave Rider-class; Cummins engine, 42 knots (78 km/h; 48 mph)	Sri Lanka	
African	–		15 m (49 ft 3 in)	Wave Rider-class; Cummins engine, 42 knots (78 km/h; 48 mph)	Sri Lanka	
Etoile	–		39 m (127 ft 11 in)	Shanghai-class II; Built especially as per Seychelles specifications. Equipped with a 6.5-metre speed boat	China	
La Fleche	–		30 m (98 ft 5 in)	Rodman Group, Spain built	UAE	
Le Vigilant	–		30 m (98 ft 5 in)	Rodman Group, Spain built	UAE	
–	3		7 m (23 ft 0 in)	Rigid hull inflatables	UAE	
Fortune	–		14.3 m (46 ft 11 in)	Saw service with Royal National Lifeboat Institution	United Kingdom	
Zoroaster	–		50 m (164 ft 1 in)	Rajshree-class patrol vessel; 34 knots (63 km/h; 39 mph); refits in 2024 and 2026.	India	
Hermes	–		27.5 m (90 ft 3 in)	L&T-class fast interceptor craft (ex C-405)	India	
Constant	–		46 m (150 ft 11 in)	Trinkat-class patrol vessel; 320-ton vessel, 56–60 km/h (35–37 mph) speeds; SDB Mk 5 patrol vessel	India	
Topaz	–		48 m (157 ft 6 in)	Trinkat-class patrol vessel; Medium refit in 2017	India	
Lespwar	1		52 m (170 ft 7 in)	Adamaya-class patrol vessel	India	

=== Former vessels ===
- Andromache

=== Aircraft ===
- Harbin Y-12
- Dornier 228

== See also ==
- Action of 30 March 2010
