= Nancowry Subdivision =

Administrative division in Nicobar district

- Location within Andaman and Nicobar Islands

Geography
- Location: Bay of Bengal
- Coordinates: 8.16°N 93.36°E
- Type: Island group
- Archipelago: Nicobar Islands
- Adjacent to: Indian Ocean
- Total islands: 15
- Major islands: Katchal; Kamorta; Teressa; Nancowry; Chowra
- Area: 453.65 km^{2} (175.16 sq mi)

Administration
- India
- District: Nicobar
- Island group: Nicobar Islands
- Subdivisions of India: Nancowry Subdivision
- Largest settlement: Kalatapu (pop. 1870)

Demographics
- Population: 10636 (2011)
- Pop. density: 23.5/km^{2} (60.9/sq mi)
- Ethnic groups: Hindu, Nicobarese

Additional information
- Time zone: IST (UTC+5:30)
- PIN: 744301
- Telephone code: 03192
- ISO code: IN-AN-00
- Official website: www.and.nic.in
- Literacy: 84.4%
- Avg. summer temperature: 30.2 °C (86.4 °F)
- Avg. winter temperature: 23.0 °C (73.4 °F)
- Sex ratio: 1.2♂/♀
- Census Code: 35.638.0001
- Official Languages: Hindi, English, Tamil; Car (regional)

Nancowry Subdivision is one of three local administrative divisions of the Indian district of Nicobar, part of the Indian union territory of Andaman and Nicobar Islands.

== Demography ==
Languages of Nancowry tehsil (2011)
1. Nicobarese (70.5%)
2. Tamil (7.58%)
3. Sadri (5.05%)
4. Bengali (4.45%)
5. Hindi (3.55%)
6. Kurukh (2.69%)
7. Telugu (2.47%)
8. Malayalam (1.50%)
9. Others (2.21%)

Nicobarese is the most spoken language in Nancowry tehsil. As of the 2011 census, Nicobarese is spoken as the first language by 88.61 percent of the tehsil's population. Population of major languages are:

Nicobarese 7,497; Sadri 537; Hindi 377; Bengali 473; Tamil 806; Kurukh 286; Telugu 263; Malayalam 160.

== Administration ==
It includes 4 taluks:

- Nancowrie taluk
- Kamorta taluk
- Teressa and Chowra taluk
- Katchal taluk
