= PS Topaz =

Seychelles Coast Guard patrol vessel

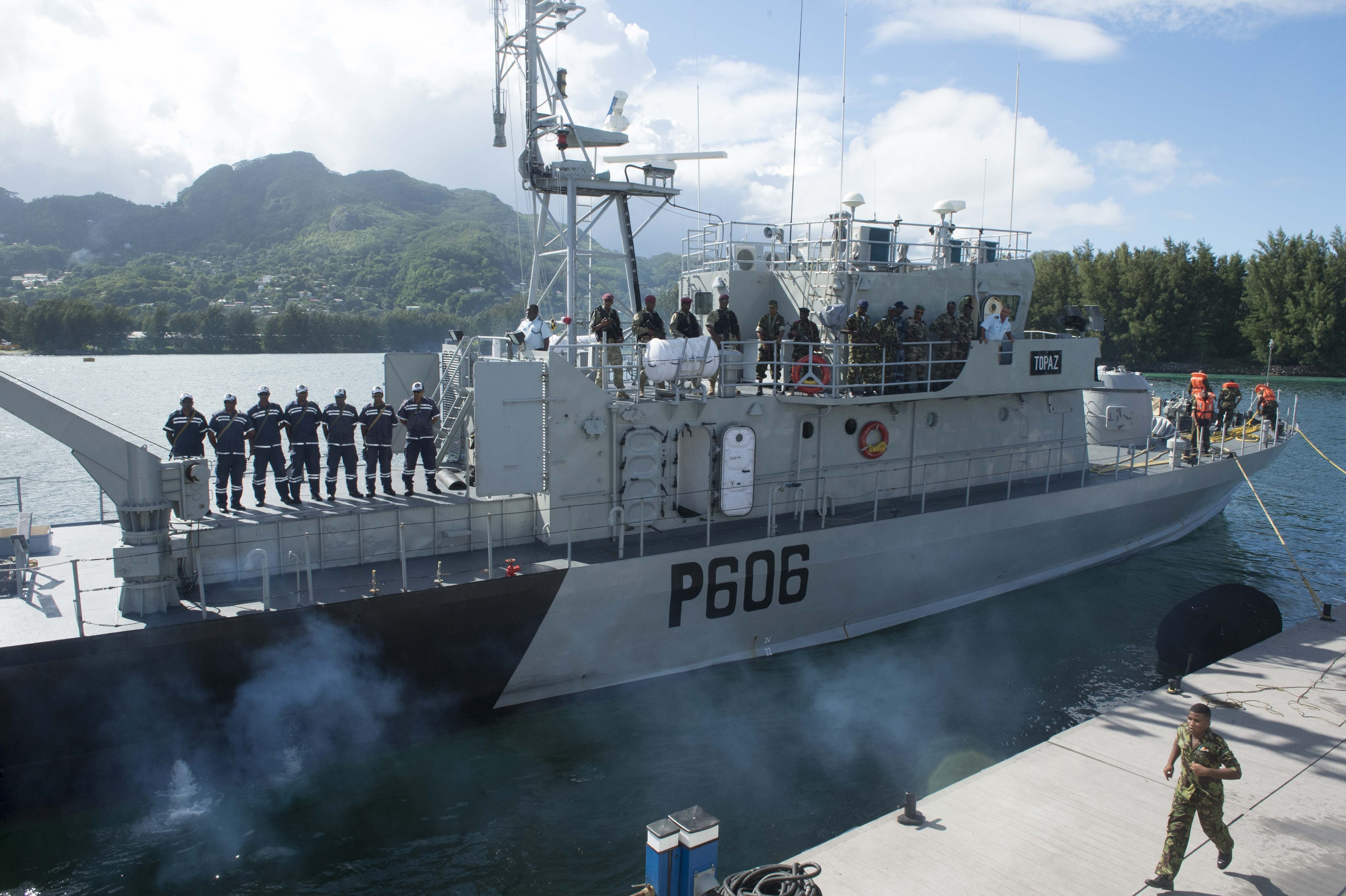
- PS Topaz in 2013

History

India
- Name: INS Tarmugli
- Namesake: Tarmugli Island
- Builder: Garden Reach Shipbuilders & Engineers
- Commissioned: 4 March 2002
- Identification: T64
- Fate: Transferred to Seychelles Coast Guard on 23 February 2005

Seychelles
- Name: PS Topaz
- Commissioned: 23 February 2005
- Decommissioned: 8 May 2026
- Fate: Scuttled off Conception Island, Seychelles on 9 May 2026
- Status: Decommissioned

General characteristics
- Class & type: Trinkat-class fast attack craft

PS Topaz was a Trinkat-class fast attack craft owned and operated by the Seychelles Coast Guard. She was formerly operated by the Indian Navy as INS Tarmugli (T64). India, like China and the United Arab Emirates, have helped equip the Seychelles Coast Guard with patrol vessels. The Seychelles has a strategic location close to the area off the Horn of Africa that is notorious for pirate attacks.

In 2005, she was the first vessel India turned over to Seychelles. A sister ship, re-christened PS Constant, was transferred in 2014.

It participated in anti-piracy action of 30 March 2010.

She was decommissioned on 8 May 2026 and scuttled off Conception Island on 9 May 2026 to create an artificial reef and dive site.
