= Car Nicobar-class fast attack craft =

Type of Indian naval vessel

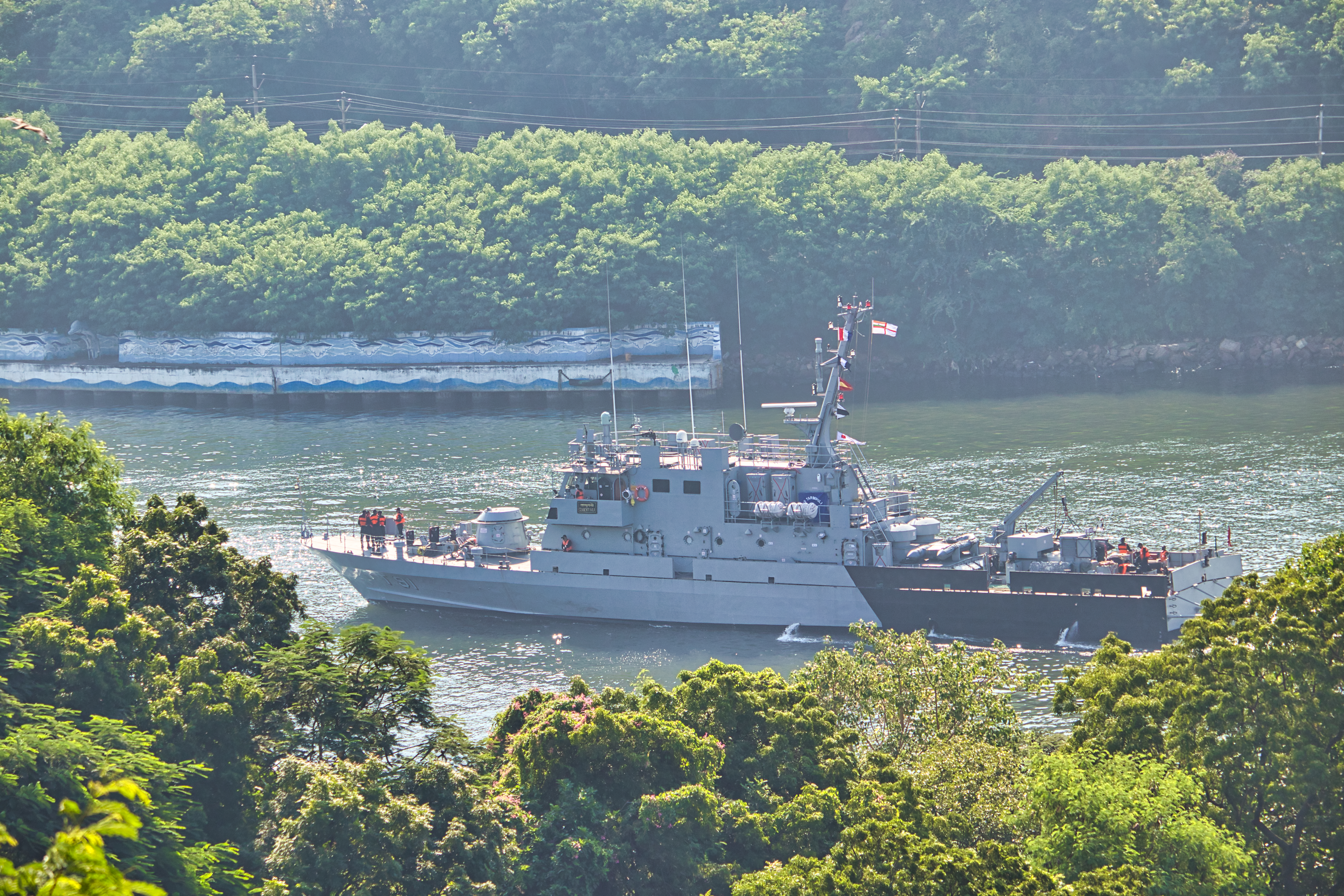
- INS Tarmugli (T91) near Visakhapatnam port.

Class overview
- Name: Car Nicobar class
- Builders: Garden Reach Shipbuilders and Engineers
- Operators: Indian Navy; (Maldives) Maldivian Coast Guard
- Preceded by: Bangaram class
- Succeeded by: New Water Jet Fast Attack Craft
- Cost: ₹500 crore (equivalent to ₹15 billion or US$160 million in 2023) overall cost; ₹35 crore (equivalent to ₹106 crore or US$11 million in 2023) for each ship
- Built: 2007–2017
- In commission: 2009-present
- Planned: 14
- Completed: 14
- Active: 13 Indian Navy; 1 (Maldives) Maldivian Coast Guard
- Retired: 0

General characteristics
- Type: Fast attack craft
- Displacement: Fleet I: 293 t (288 long tons; 323 short tons); Fleet II: 315 t (310 long tons; 347 short tons)
- Length: 48.9 m (160 ft 5 in)
- Beam: 7.5 m (24 ft 7 in)
- Draught: 2.1 m (6 ft 11 in)
- Propulsion: 3 × MTU 16V 4000 M90 diesel engines, 11,238 PS (8,266 kW); 3 × Hamilton HM811 waterjets
- Speed: 35 kn (65 km/h; 40 mph)
- Range: 2,000 nmi (3,700 km; 2,300 mi) at 13 kn (24 km/h; 15 mph)
- Crew: 29 including 6 officers
- Sensors & processing systems: Navigation radar; LINK II tactical datalink and satellite communication (SATCOM) to Rukmani; Surface search radar
- Armament: 1 × CRN-91 30mm autocannon; Igla SA-18 SAM; 2 × 12.7 mm HMGs

The Car Nicobar class of high-speed fast attack crafts are built by Garden Reach Shipbuilders and Engineers (GRSE) for the Indian Navy. The vessels are designed as a cost-effective platform for patrol, anti-piracy and rescue operations in India's exclusive economic zone. In 2023, one of the ships, INS Tarmugli, was donated to the Maldivian Coast Guard.

The class and its vessels are named for Indian islands. They are the first water jet-propelled vessels of the Indian Navy.

Unlike the United States Coast Guard's similarly sized Sentinel class cutters, the class is propelled by water jets, at up to 35 knots (65 km/h), where the American patrol vessels conventional propulsion systems maximum stated speed is 28 knots (52 km/h). Both classes have a mission endurance of 2,000 nautical miles (3,700 km).

INS Kalpeni (T-75) visited the Port of Colombo, Sri Lanka from 19 to 21 October 2024 as a part of Operational Turnaround. The ship with a 70-member was commanded by Lieutenant Commander Sunil K Kulhari.

== Design ==
The Car Nicobar-class vessels were designed and built by GRSE. Production of the class was fast tracked after the 2008 Mumbai attacks. The vessels feature improved habitability with fully air-conditioned modular accommodation, on board reverse osmosis plant for desalination, and a sewage treatment plant.

The vessels are each powered by three HamiltonJet HM811 water jets, coupled with MTU 16V 4000 M90 engines, delivering a combined 8,160 kW (10,940 hp) of power. An aluminium superstructure reduces weight and is designed to reduce radar cross-section.

As patrol vessels, they are lightly armed. They carry various sensors, including the Furuno navigation radar and sonar. Armament on board includes a 30 mm CRN-91 automatic cannon with an electronic day-night fire control system of Ordnance Factory Board (OFB) and Bharat Electronics Limited (BEL) origin. The vessels also mount two 12.7 mm heavy machine guns (HMG) and multiple medium machine guns, besides carrying shoulder-launched Igla surface-to-air missiles to combat aerial threats.

The first two vessels commissioned were initially restricted to speeds up to 27 knots (50 km/h; 31 mph) due to deficiency in the gearboxes, which was later rectified by KPCL. INS Kabra, the eighth in the class, has a top speed of more than 35 knots (65 km/h; 40 mph). The improved maneuverability and speed allows these vessels to have high-speed interdiction of fast-moving targets.

The last four ships are an improved variant of the Car Nicobar-class patrol boats and have been dubbed 'follow on waterjet fast attack craft' (FOWJFAC) by the Indian Navy. Improvements include an enhanced electrical power generation capacity of 280 kW and twice the reverse osmosis (RO) capacity at 4 tonnes per day.

== Ships in the class ==
Yard No.	Name	Pennant number	Launched	Commissioned	Homeport	Status
Indian Navy
Fleet I
2057	Car Nicobar	T69	23 November 2007	16 February 2009	Chennai	Active
2058	Chetlat	T70	27 November 2007	16 February 2009	Sri Vijaya Puram	Active
2059	Cora Divh	T71	16 July 2008	10 September 2009	Sri Vijaya Puram	Active
2060	Cheriyam	T72	16 July 2008	10 September 2009	Sri Vijaya Puram	Active
2061	Cankarso	T73	27 March 2009	29 June 2010	Goa	Active
2062	Kondul	T74	27 March 2009	29 June 2010	Goa	Active
2063	Kalpeni	T75	27 March 2009	14 October 2010	Kochi	Active
2064	Kabra	T76	29 March 2010	8 June 2011	Kochi	Active
2065	Koswari	T77	29 March 2010	12 July 2011	Karwar	Active
2066	Karuva	T78	29 March 2010	25 August 2011	Port Blair	Active
Fleet II: FOWJFAC
2110	Tillanchang	T92	30 June 2015	9 March 2017	Karwar	Active
2111	Tihayu	T93	30 June 2015	19 October 2016	Visakhapatnam	Active
2112	Tarasa	T94	30 June 2016	26 September 2017	Mumbai	Active
(Maldives) Maldivian Coast Guard
Fleet II
2109	MCGS Huravee (formerly Tarmugli)		30 June 2015	23 May 2016		Transferred to Maldivian Coast Guard and commissioned on 2 May 2023 as MCGS Huravee

== Operations ==
INS Car Nicobar and INS Chetlat are based in Chennai under India's Eastern Naval Command.

INS Cankarso and INS Kondul are based in Goa under the Western Naval Command.

INS Kalpeni is based in Kochi under the Southern Naval Command.

INS Kalpeni called at Gan, Addu Atoll, Maldives on 25 April 2026. The ship had earlier visited the Port of Colombo, Sri Lanka on 19 October 2024 for a similar diplomatic mission.

=== Operation Island Watch ===
In January 2011, as a part of Operation Island Watch, INS Cankarso and INS Kalpeni were deployed on anti-piracy patrol to the west of the Lakshadweep archipelago. On 28 January, Cankarso responded to a Mayday call from a container ship. Upon reaching the site, she saw Somali pirate skiffs being hoisted aboard a hijacked Thai fishing trawler, Prantalay 14, which was being used as a pirate mother ship.

Cankarso ordered the pirated ship to stop for inspection. The pirates on board fired on Cankarso as they tried to flee west towards Somalia. Cankarso returned the fire, which hit some of the fuel drums stored on Prantalay 14's deck for refuelling the skiffs. The mother ship was set ablaze and sank, even as Kalpeni and an Indian Coast Guard patrol vessel, ICGS Sankalp, reached the site. 15 pirates were arrested, and the 20 crew of the fishing trawler were all rescued unharmed.

In another operation on 13 March 2011, an Indian Navy patrol aircraft spotted the Mozambique-registered fishing vessel, Vega 5, when responding to a merchant ship reporting a pirate attack. Beira-based Vega 5, owned by Spanish company Pescamar Lda, had been captured on 27 December 2010 by pirates who were demanding US$1.8 million in ransom. INS Kalpeni intercepted the pirated ship about 1,100 kilometres (680 mi) off Kochi on India's west coast. A fire broke out on the vessel when Kalpeni returned fired after being fired upon by the pirates. 61 pirates were rescued and arrested after they jumped into the Arabian Sea to escape the fire. The crew of Kalpeni put out the fire on board Vega 5, rescued her 13 crew members and escorted her to Mumbai. Rocket-propelled grenades and over 80 assault rifles were recovered from the pirates.

== See also ==
- List of active Indian Navy ships
