= MCGS Huravee (2023) =

Indian navy fast attack craft

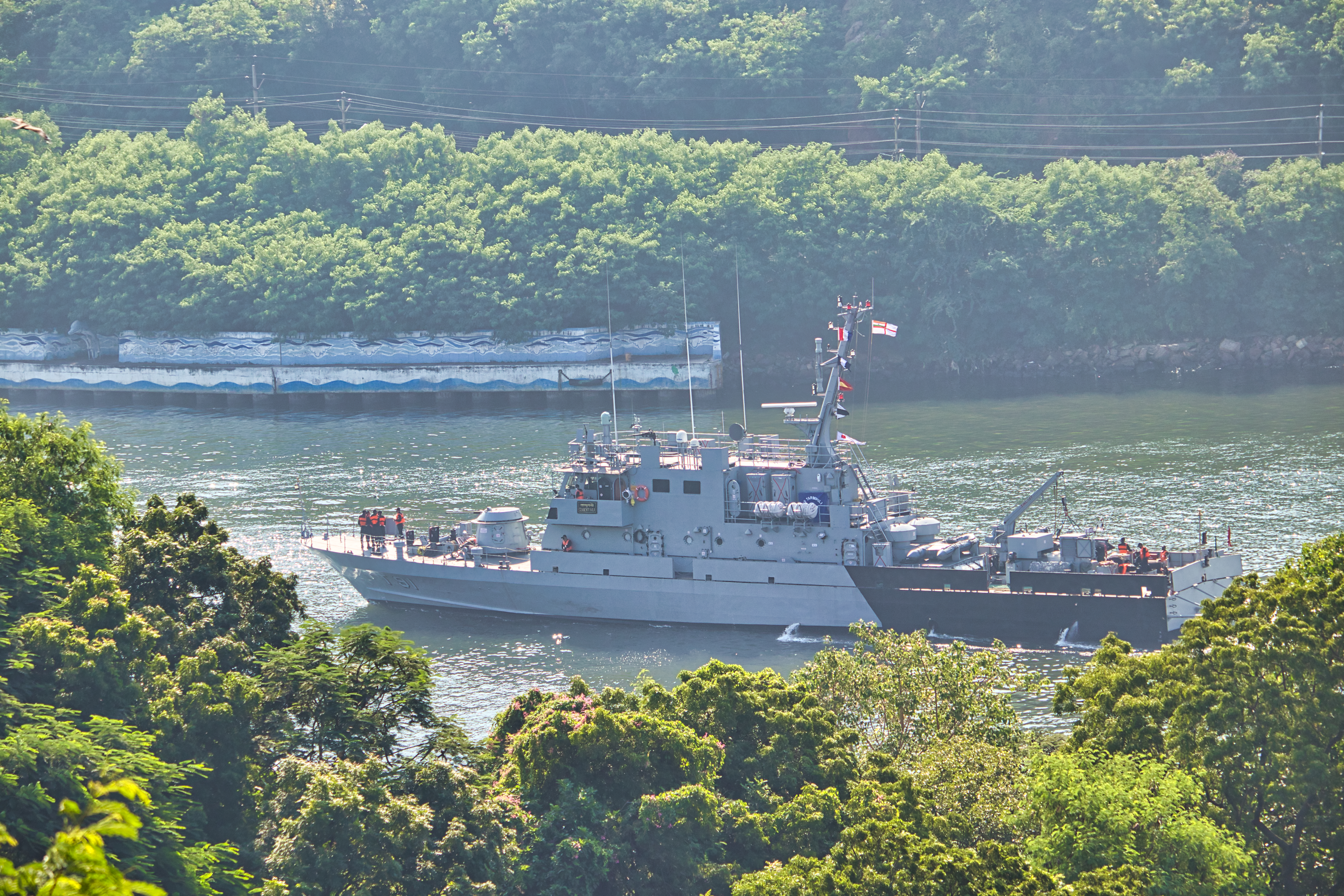

History

India
- Name: Tarmugli
- Namesake: Tarmugli Island
- Operator: Indian Navy
- Builder: Garden Reach Shipbuilders & Engineers
- Yard number: 2109
- Launched: 30 June 2015
- Commissioned: 23 May 2016
- Decommissioned: 7 April 2023
- Identification: MMSI number: 419001107
- Fate: Transferred to Maldivian Coast Guard as MCGS Huravee on 2 May 2023

Maldives
- Name: MCGS Huravee
- Commissioned: 2 May 2023
- Status: In active service

General characteristics
- Class & type: Car Nicobar-class
- Type: Patrol vessel
- Displacement: 320 tonnes
- Length: 48 meters
- Speed: 30 knots (56 km/h)
- Endurance: 2,000 nautical miles (3,700 km)
- Complement: 45
- Armament: 1 X 30 mm CRN 91 gun, 2 X 12.7 mm HMG, multiple MMG, 9K38 Igla Surface-to-Air missile

MCGS Huravee, formerly INS Tarmugli, is a fast attack craft of the Car Nicobar class in the Indian Navy and the first ship in the series of four Follow On Water Jet Fast Attack Craft (FOWJFAC). The ship was commissioned by Vice Admiral HCS Bisht AVSM, Flag Officer Commanding-in-Chief, Eastern Naval Command. The indigenously conceived, designed and built ship, named after an island of same name in the Andaman archipelago is capable of operating in shallow waters at high speeds. Built for extended coastal and off-shore surveillance and patrol duties the warship is fitted with advanced MTU engines, water jet propulsion as well as latest communication equipment.

She was donated to the Maldivian Coast Guard on 2 May 2023, and commissioned as MCGS Huravee, replacing an older Trinkat-class vessel. The ship underwent refits at the Mumbai dockyard in April 2025. A supply of spare parts was made by India in late-December 2025.She participated at the International Fleet Review 2026 held at Visakapatanam in India in February 2026.
