= Geography of Vietnam =

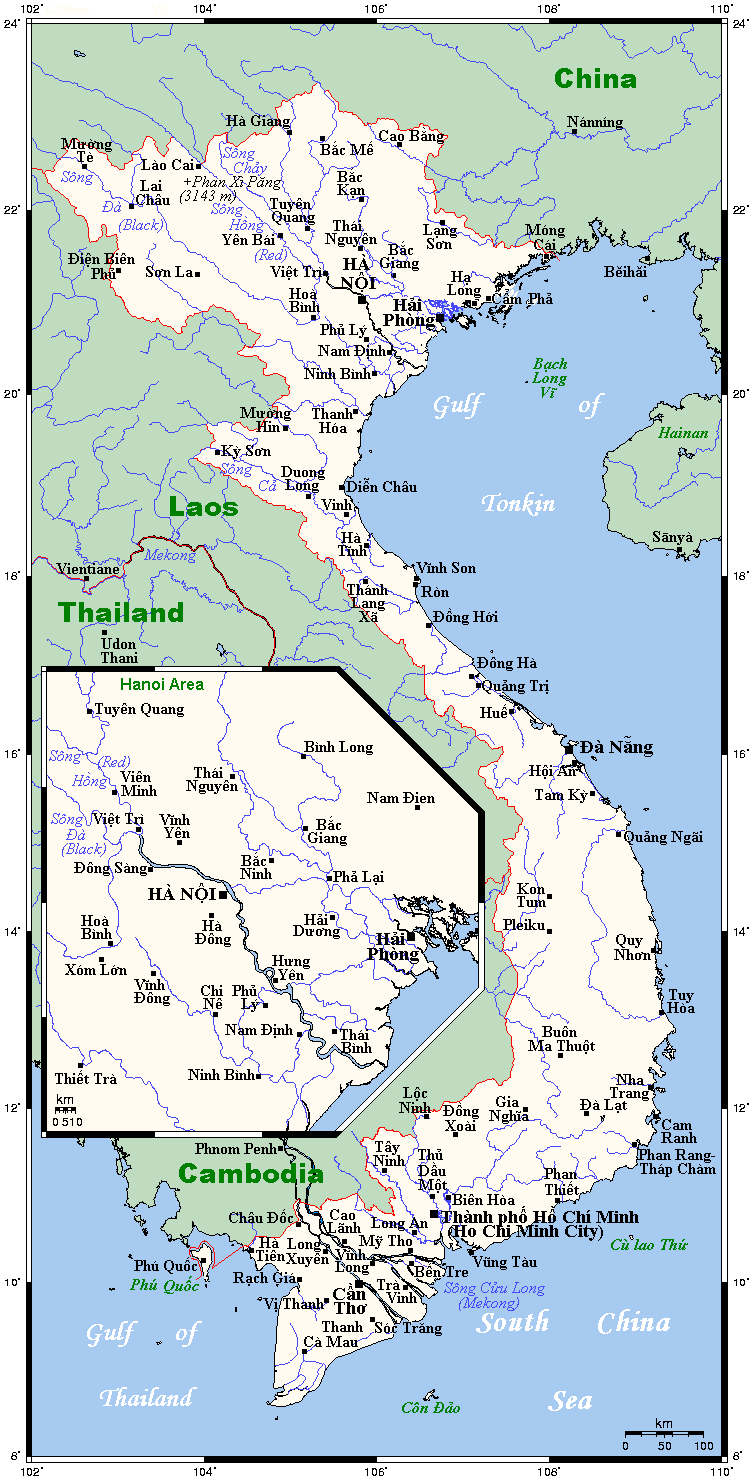
- Continent: Asia
- Region: Southeast Asia
- Coordinates: 16°00′N 108°00′E
- Area: Ranked 66th
  - Total: 331,212 km^{2} (127,882 sq mi)
  - Land: 93.62%
  - Water: 6.38%
- Coastline: 3,444 km (2,140 mi)
- Borders: 4,639 km (2,883 mi)
- Highest point: Fansipan; 3,144 metres (10,315 ft)
- Lowest point: South China Sea; 0 metres (0 ft)
- Longest river: Đồng Nai river (longest inland river); 586 kilometres (364 mi)
- Largest lake: Ba Bể Lake 6.5 square kilometres (2.5 sq mi)
- Exclusive economic zone: 417,663 km^{2} (161,261 mi^{2})

Regions of Vietnam

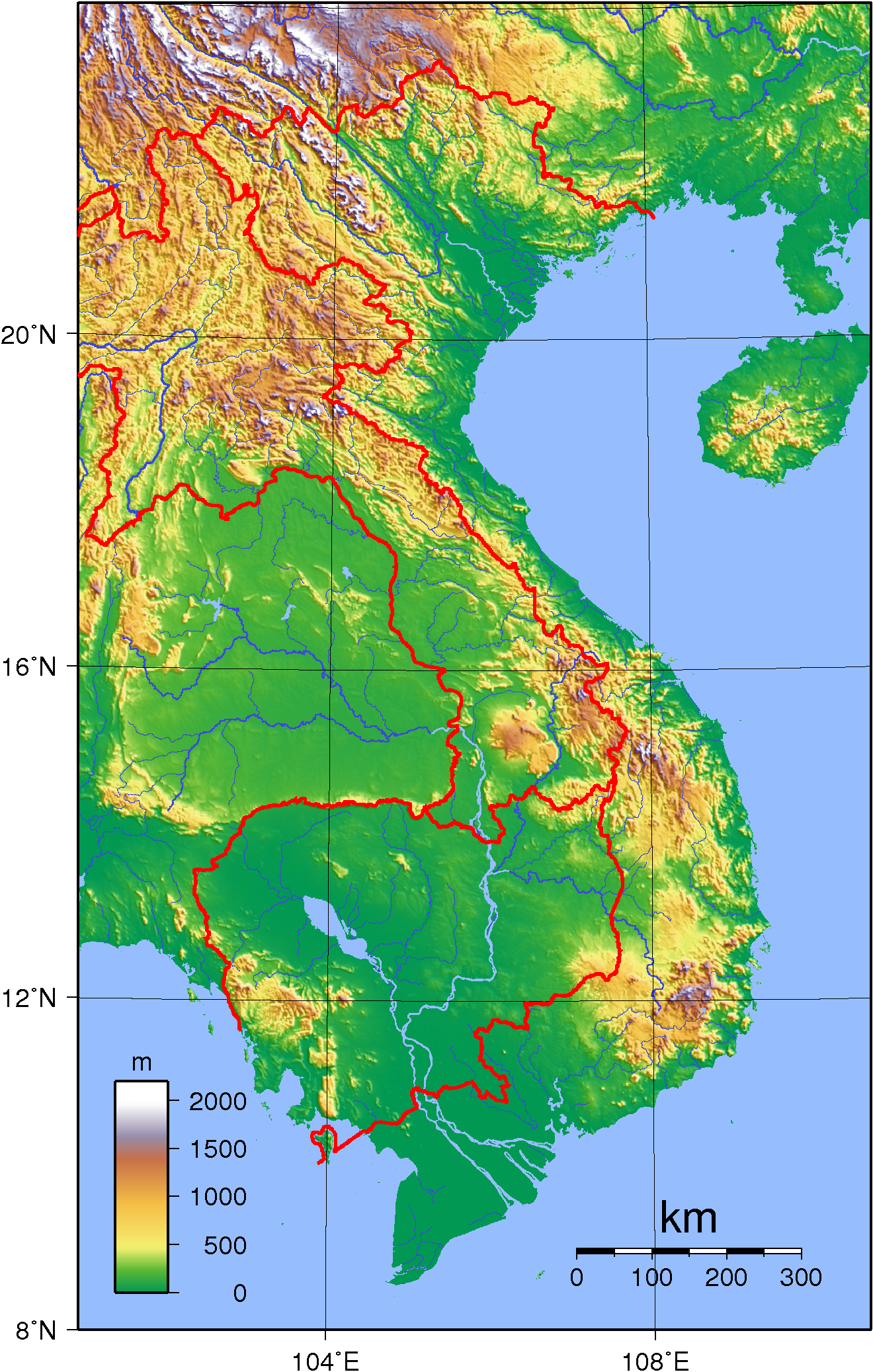
Topographic map of Vietnam

Vietnam is located on the eastern margin of the Indochinese peninsula and occupies about 331,211.6 square kilometres (127,881.5 sq mi), of which about 25% was under cultivation in 1987. It borders China, Laos, and Cambodia and has shorelines along the Gulf of Tonkin, Gulf of Thailand, and Pacific Ocean. The elongated roughly S shaped country has a north-to-south distance of 1,650 km (1,030 mi) and is about 50 km (31 mi) wide at its narrowest point. With a coastline of 3,260 km (2,030 mi), excluding islands, Vietnam claims 12 nautical miles (22.2 km; 13.8 mi) as the limit of its territorial waters, an additional 12 nautical miles (22.2 km; 13.8 mi) as a contiguous customs and security zone. It has an exclusive economic zone of 417,663 km^{2} (161,261 mi^{2}) with 200 nautical miles (370.4 km; 230.2 mi).

The boundary with Laos was settled on both an ethnic and geographical basis between the rulers of Vietnam and Laos in the mid-seventeenth century. The Annamite Range as a reference, was formally defined by a delimitation treaty signed in 1977 and ratified in 1986. The frontier with Cambodia, defined at the time of French annexation of the western part of the Mekong Delta in 1867, remained essentially unchanged, according to Hanoi, until some unresolved border issues were finally settled in the 1982–85 period. The land and sea boundary with China, delineated under the France-China treaties of 1887 and 1895, is "the frontier line" accepted by Hanoi. China agreed in 1957–1958 to respect that border line. However, in February 1979, following the Sino-Vietnamese War, Hanoi complained that from 1957 onward China had provoked numerous border incidents as part of its anti-Vietnam policy and expansionist designs in Southeast Asia. Among the territorial infringements cited was the Chinese occupation in January 1974 of the Paracel Islands, claimed by both countries in a dispute left unresolved in the 1980s.

== Physiography ==
The country is divided into the highlands and the Hong River Delta in the north, the Annamite Range along with the coastal lowlands in the centre, and the Mekong Delta in the south.

== Terrain ==
Vietnam is a country of subtropical and tropical lowlands, hills, and densely forested highlands, with level land covering less than 20% of the area.

=== Red River Delta ===
The joined Delta of Hong River (Red River) and Thái Bình River is a flat, triangular region of 15,000 square kilometres (5,800 sq mi). The Hong River Delta is smaller but more intensely developed and more densely populated than the Mekong Delta. Once an inlet of the Gulf of Tonkin, it has been filled in by the enormous alluvial deposits of the rivers over a period of millennia, and it advances one hundred meters into the Gulf annually. The ancestral home of the ethnic Vietnamese, the delta accounted for almost 70% of the agriculture and 80% of the industry of North Vietnam before 1975.

The Red River, rising in China's Yunnan province, is about 1,200 kilometres (750 mi) long. Its two main tributaries, the Sông Lô (also called the Lo River, the Riviere Claire, or the Clear River) and the Sông Đà (also called the Black River or Riviere Noire), contribute to its high water volume, which averages 4,300 cubic metres (150,000 cu ft) per second.

The entire delta region, backed by the steep rises of the forested highlands, is no more than three meters above sea level, and much of it is one meter or less. The area is subject to frequent flooding; at some places the high-water mark of floods is fourteen meters above the surrounding countryside. For centuries flood control has been an integral part of the delta's culture and economy. An extensive system of dikes and canals has been built to contain the Red River and to irrigate the rich rice-growing delta. Modeled on that of China's, this ancient system has sustained a highly concentrated population and has made double-cropping wet-rice cultivation possible throughout about half the region.

=== Mountainous ===
The mountain plateaus in the north and northwest are inhabited mainly by tribal minority groups. The Dãy Trường Sơn (Annamite Range) originates in the Tibetan and Yunnan regions of southwest China and forms Vietnam's border with Laos. It terminates in the Mekong River Delta north of Ho Chi Minh City (formerly Saigon).

These central mountains, which have several high plateaus, are irregular in elevation and form. The northern section is narrow and very rugged; the country's highest peak, Fan Si Pan, rises to 3,142 meters in the extreme northwest. The southern portion has numerous spurs that divide the narrow coastal strip into a series of compartments. For centuries these topographical features not only rendered north–south communication difficult, but also formed an effective natural barrier for the containment of the people living in the Mekong basin.

=== Central Highlands ===
Within the southern portion of Vietnam is a plateau known as the Central Highlands (Tây Nguyên), approximately 51,800 square kilometers of rugged mountain peaks, extensive forests, and rich soil. Comprising five relatively flat plateaus of basalt soil spread over the provinces of Đắk Lắk (or "Dac Lac"), Gia Lai, and Kon Tum, the highlands account for 16% of the country's arable land and 22% of its total forested land. Before 1975, North Vietnam had maintained that the Central Highlands and the Day Truong Son were strategic areas of paramount importance, essential to the domination not only of South Vietnam but also of the southern part of Indochina. Since 1975, the highlands have provided an area in which to relocate people from the densely populated lowlands.

=== Coastal lowlands ===
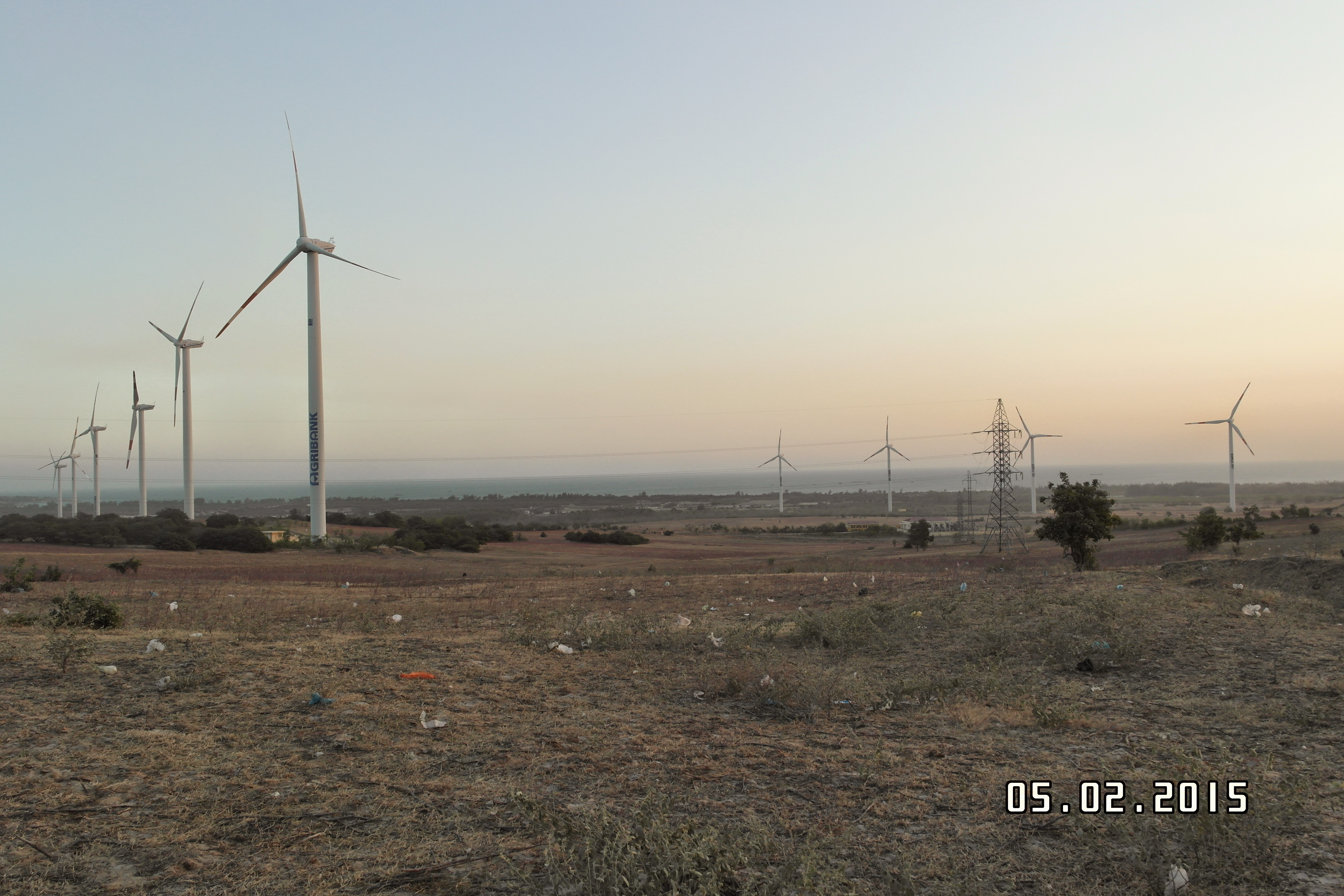
Wind turbines in Tuy Phong District, Bình Thuận province, South Central Coast, one of the driest areas in Vietnam, with average precipitation of 272 mm (10.7 in) per year.

The narrow, flat coastal lowlands extend from south of the Red River Delta to the Mekong River basin. On the landward side, the Dãy Trường Sơn rises precipitously above the coast, its spurs jutting into the sea at several places. Generally the coastal strip is fertile and rice is cultivated intensively.

A recent global remote sensing analysis suggested that there were 3,069 km^{2} of tidal flats in Vietnam, making it the 10th ranking country in terms of how much tidal flat occurs there.

=== Mekong River Delta ===
The Mekong Delta, covering about 40,000 square kilometers, is a low-level plain not more than three meters above sea level at any point and criss-crossed by a maze of canals and rivers. So much sediment is carried by the Mekong's various branches and tributaries that the delta advances sixty to eighty meters into the sea every year. An official Vietnamese source estimates the amount of sediment deposited annually to be about 1 billion cubic meters, or nearly thirteen times the amount deposited by the Red River. About 10,000 square kilometers of the delta are under rice cultivation, making the area one of the major rice-growing regions of the world. The southern tip, known as the Cà Mau Peninsula is covered by dense jungle and mangrove swamps.

The Mekong, which is 4,220 kilometers long, is one of the 12 great rivers of the world. From its source in the Tibetan Plateau, it flows through the Tibetan and Yunnan regions of China, forms the boundary between Laos and Myanmar as well as between Laos and Thailand. At Phnom Penh it merges with the Tonlé Sap and divides into two branches – the Sông Hậu Giang (Hậu Giang river) (known as the Bassac River on the Cambodian side) and the Sông Tiền Giang (Tiền Giang river) – and continues through Cambodia and the Mekong basin before draining into the South China Sea through nine mouths known as the Cửu Long (nine dragons). The river is heavily silted and is navigable by seagoing craft of shallow draft as far as Kompong Cham in Cambodia. A tributary entering the river at Phnom Penh drains the Tonlé Sap, a shallow freshwater lake that acts as a natural reservoir to stabilize the flow of water through the lower Mekong. When the river is in flood stage, its silted delta outlets are unable to carry off the high volume of water. Floodwaters back up into the Tonlé Sap, causing the lake to inundate as much as 10,000 square kilometers. As the flood subsides, the flow of water reverses and proceeds from the lake to the sea. The effect is to reduce significantly the danger of devastating floods in the Mekong delta, where the river floods the surrounding fields each year to a level of one to two meters.

== Climate ==
Vietnam map of Köppen climate classification

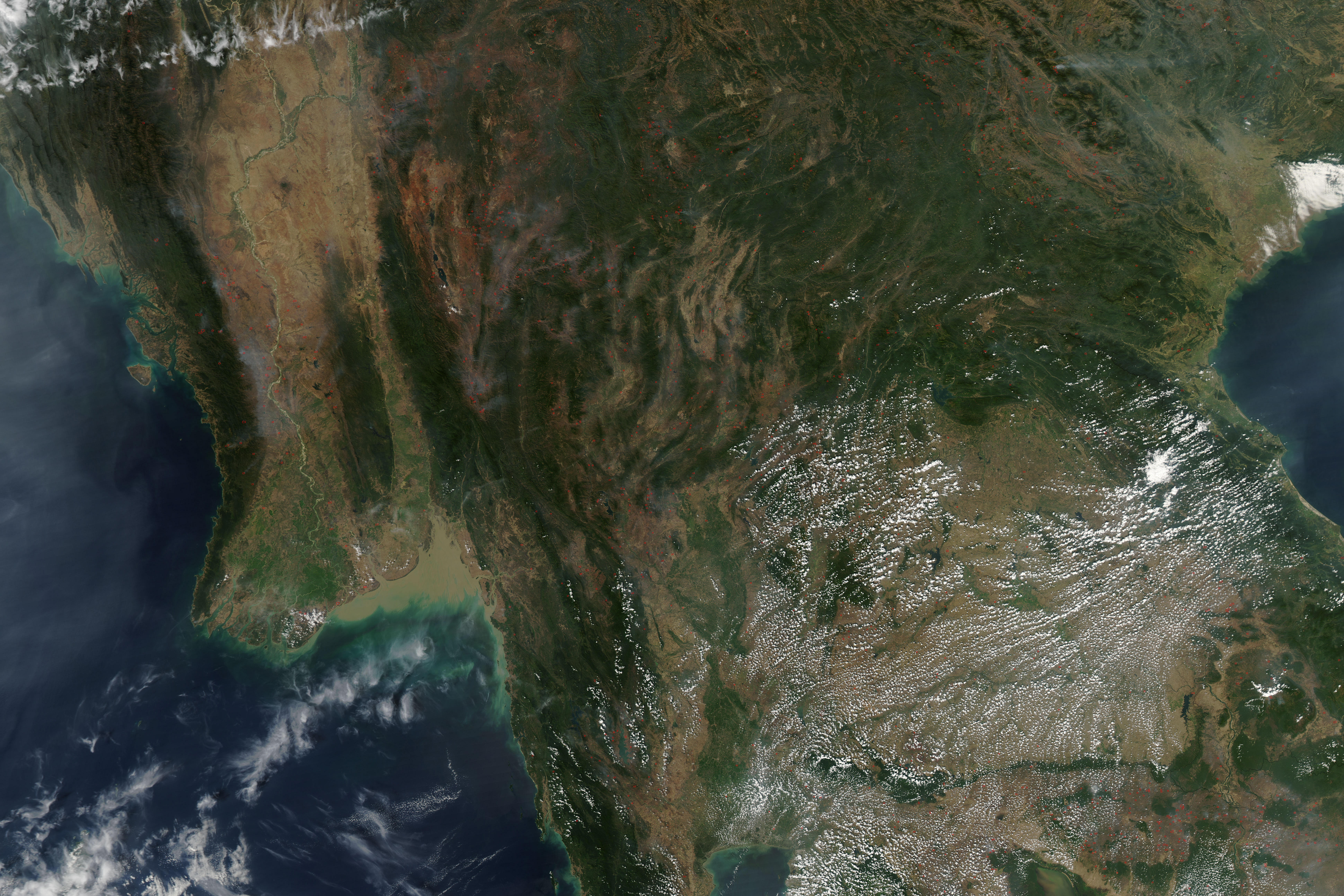
Hundreds of active fires burning across the hills and valleys of Myanmar, Thailand, Laos, and Vietnam (labelled with red dots).

Vietnam's climate, being located in the tropics and strongly influenced by the South China Sea has a monsoon-influenced climate typical of that of mainland Southeast Asia. In the north, the climate is humid subtropical and monsoonal and with four distinct seasons (Spring, Summer, Autumn, and Winter) while in the central and south, the climate is tropical monsoon with two seasons (rainy and dry). In addition, temperate climate exists in mountainous areas, which are found in Sa Pa and Da Lat, while a more continental climate exists in Lai Châu province and Sơn La province. The diverse topography, wide range of latitudes (Vietnam spans over 15° of latitude), and influences from the South China Sea lead to climatic conditions varying significantly between regions.

Based on geographic and climatic conditions, there are seven different climatic regions in Vietnam: Northwest, Northeast, North Delta (Red River Delta), North Central (North Central Coast), South Central (South Central Coast), Central Highlands, and the South. The South is subdivided into the Southeast for the southeastern provinces and the Mekong Delta for the southwestern provinces. Generally, these seven different climatic regions are grouped into two main types: The North (includes Northwest, Northeast, North Delta (Red River Delta), North Central (North Central Coast)) which includes all areas north of the Hải Vân Pass and the South (South Central Coast, Central Highlands and the extreme south) which includes all areas south of the Hải Vân Pass. These climatic regions are based on time of rainy season and other climatic elements such as insolation, sunshine, temperature, precipitation, and humidity.

During winter, polar air originating from the Siberian High penetrate deeply into the low latitudes, facilitated by the eastern Tibetan Plateau that funnels the air southwards in a northeast direction (the cool air is a wind coming from the northeast). Many cold fronts can penetrate into Vietnam during winter of which there are three to four occurrences every month in northern Vietnam. This leads to cold temperatures where temperatures drop by 4 to 5 °C (7 to 9 °F). Cold weather, occasionally extreme cold can persist for a long time, being characterized by a long stretch of cloudless or partly cloudy days in the first half of winter or a long stretch of cloudy and drizzly conditions in the latter half of winter. Cold weather occurs more frequently in the north than in the south due to cold fronts penetrate the north more frequently.

In summer, the general wind pattern are southwesterly winds in the southern parts of Vietnam and southeasterly winds in northern Vietnam. The predominantly air blocks in Vietnam are the equatorial and tropical blocks that originate from high pressure systems in the Southern Hemisphere, and a maritime tropical block originating from the subtropical high pressure system in the Pacific Ocean (Pacific subtropical high pressure). In addition, during summer, Vietnam is influenced by tropical air from the Bay of Bengal which occurs when a continental low pressure originating from South Asia (South Asian continental low) moves eastwards towards Vietnam, covering almost all of Vietnam and southern China; this causes hot, dry weather in the North Central Coast as westerly winds descend and warm adiabatically on the eastern slopes of the Annamite Range (Truong Son Range). On average, eleven storms and tropical low pressures develop in the South China sea during summer of which half are tropical cyclones that originate from the western Pacific. These storms and cyclones then move westwards towards Vietnam. On average, Vietnam is affected by six to eight typhoons or tropical cyclones per year.

Spring and Fall are transitional seasons. The atmospheric circulation in these seasons represent a transition between winter–summer and summer–winter respectively.

Mean annual temperatures in the country, based on meteorological data from weather stations range from 12.8 to 27.7 °C (55 to 82 °F) in Hoang Lien Son. At the highest altitudes in the Hoang Lien Son range, mean annual temperatures is only 8 °C (46 °F). As temperatures vary by altitude, temperatures decrease by 0.5 °C (1 °F) for every 100 metres (328 ft) increase in altitude. The lowest mean annual temperatures are found in the mountainous areas where the altitude is higher and in northern areas due to their higher latitudes. Many mountainous areas in the north have experienced subzero conditions. In contrast, temperatures in the Spratly Islands never falls below 21 °C (70 °F). Because Vietnam is strongly influenced by the monsoon, the mean temperatures in Vietnam are lower than other countries located at the same latitude in Asia. The highest temperatures normally occurs in March–May in the south and May–July in the north. Temperatures in summer are relatively equal among the northern and southern parts of the country with differences being mostly due to altitude (the decrease in temperature is predominantly due to altitude).

Mean annual rainfall in the country ranges from 700 to 5,000 mm (28 to 197 in) although most places in Vietnam receive between 1,400 to 2,400 mm (55 to 94 in). The majority of rainfall occurs during the rainy season, which is responsible for 80%–90% of the annual precipitation. Generally, northern parts of the country receive more rainfall than southern parts of the country. Drizzle is a weather phenomenon that is characteristic of the weather in winter in the north and north central coast. Depending on the region, the onset of the rainy season (defined as when the monthly average precipitation exceeds 100 mm (3.9 in)) differs.

== Area and boundaries ==
Area
- Total: 331,210 km^{2} (127,880 sq mi)
  - country rank in the world: 66th
- Land: 310,070 km^{2} (119,720 sq mi)
- Water: 21,140 km^{2} (8,160 sq mi)

Area – comparative
- Australia comparative: approximately 4/9 larger than Victoria
- Canada comparative: approximately half the size of Alberta
- United States comparative: slightly larger than New Mexico
- United Kingdom comparative: approximately 1 1/3 times the size of the United Kingdom
- EU comparative: slightly larger than Poland

Land boundaries
- Total: 4,639 kilometres (2,883 mi)
- Border countries: Cambodia 1,228 km (763 mi), China 1,281 km (796 mi), Laos 2,130 km (1,320 mi)

Coastline
3,444 km (2,140 mi) (excludes islands)

Maritime Claims
- Contiguous zone: 24 nmi (44.4 km; 27.6 mi)
- Continental shelf: 200 nmi (370.4 km; 230.2 mi) or to the edge of the continental margin
- Exclusive economic zone: 417,663 km^{2} (161,261 mi^{2}), 200 nmi (370.4 km; 230.2 mi)
(Territorial sea: 12 nmi (22.2 km; 13.8 mi)

Elevation extremes
- Lowest point: South China Sea 0 m
- Highest point: Fansipan 3,144 m (10,315 ft)

Rivers
- Longest river: Đồng Nai river (longest inland river) 586 kilometres (364 mi)

Lakes
- Biggest lake: Ba Bể Lake 6.5 square kilometres (2.5 sq mi)

== Resources and land use ==
Natural resources: phosphates, coal, manganese, rare earth elements, bauxite, offshore oil and gas deposits, timber, hydropower

Land use:

Arable land: 19.64%
Permanent crops: 11.18%
Other: 69.18% (2011)

Irrigated land: 45,850 km^{2} (2005)

Total renewable water resources: 864.1 km^{3} (2011)

Freshwater withdrawal (domestic/industrial/agricultural):

total: 82.03 km^{3}/yr (1%/4%/95%)
per capita: 965 m^{3}/yr (2005)

== Environmental concerns ==
Environmental issues in Vietnam include climate change, habitat loss and degradation, water pollution, and air pollution. Heavy pesticide use and military activities during the Vietnam War have contributed to lingering environmental damage. Vietnam's rapid industrialization following economic reforms in 1986, known as Đổi Mới, has also contributed to habitat degradation and pollution. Government action has been partially successful in addressing certain issues such as deforestation. Though environmental activism has increased since the Đổi Mới reforms, it has had more limited success.

=== Climate change ===
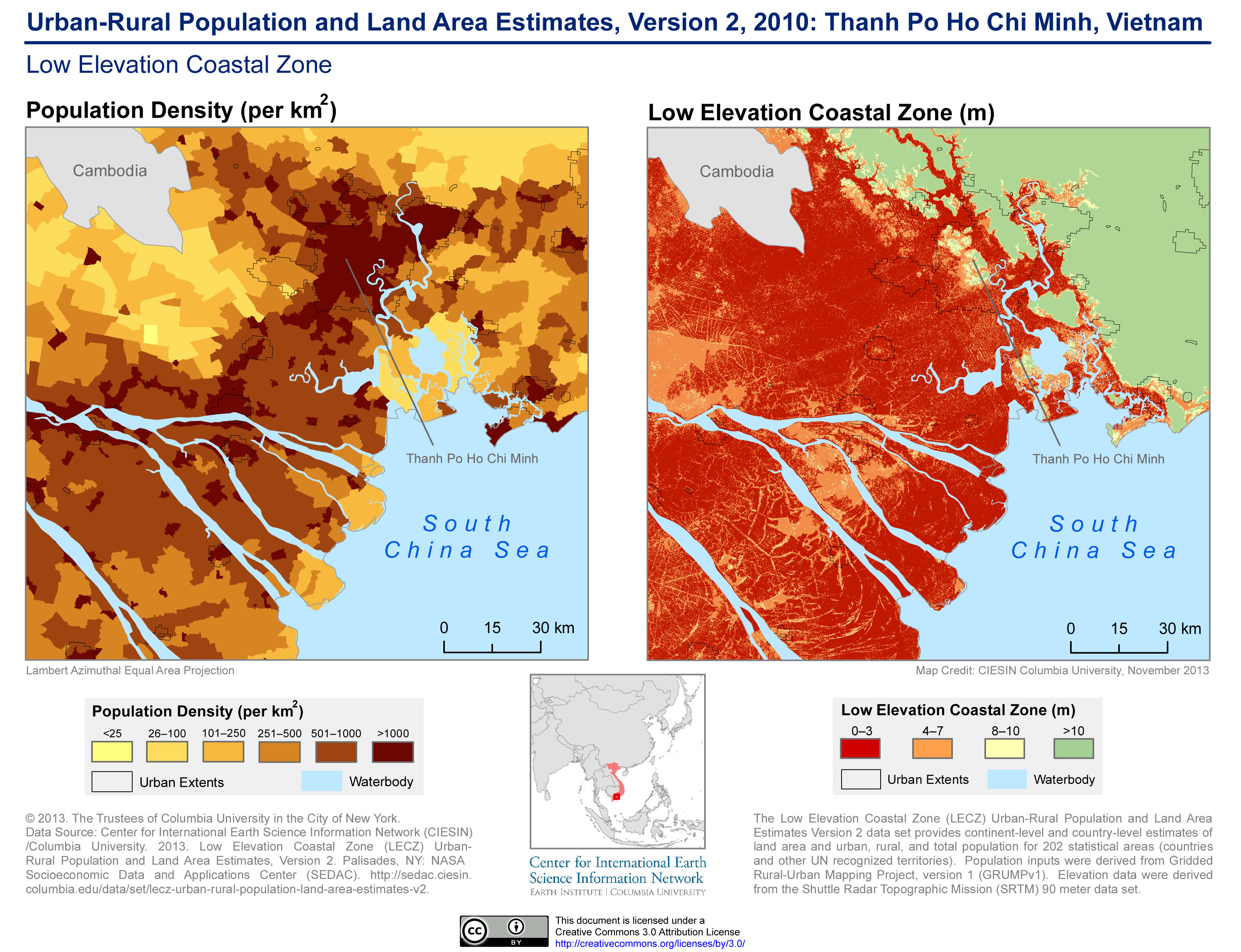
Population density and elevation above sea level in Ho Chi Minh City (2010)

Vietnam is among the most affected countries by global climate change. A large number of studies show that Vietnam is experiencing climate change and will be severely negatively affected in coming decades. These negative effects include sea level rise, salinity intrusion and other hydrological problems like floods, river mouth evolution and sedimentation. Natural hazards such as cold waves, storm surges will increase in frequency, with negative effects on the country's development, infrastructure and economy.

Some issues, such as land subsidence (caused by excessive groundwater extraction) further worsen some of the effects climate change will bring (sea level rise) especially in areas such as the Mekong Delta. The government, NGOs, and citizens have taken various measures to mitigate and adapt to the impact.

== See also ==
- Exclusive economic zone of Vietnam
- List of endangered species in Vietnam
- Zomia (geography)
- History of Vietnam
