= Strait of Malacca =

Strait between the Malay Peninsula and the Indonesian island of Sumatra

- Selat Melaka (Malay); سلت ملاک (Malay); Selat Malaka (Indonesian); ช่องแคบมะละกา (Thai); Seulat Malaka (Acehnese); மலாக்கா நீரிணை (Tamil); 馬六甲海峽/马六甲海峡 (Chinese)
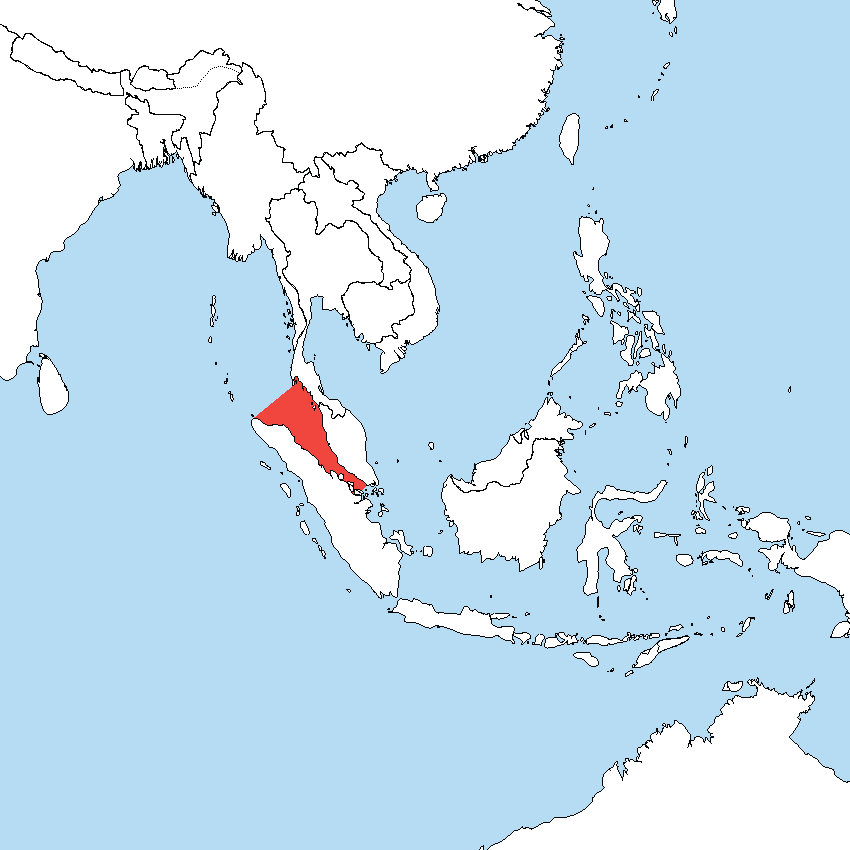
- The Strait of Malacca connects the Pacific Ocean to the east with the Indian Ocean to the west
- Interactive map of Strait of Malacca
- Type: Strait
- Part of: Indian Ocean
- Basin countries: Indonesia; Malaysia; Singapore; Thailand
- Max. length: 930 km (580 mi)
- Max. width: 250 km (160 mi)
- Min. width: 38 km (24 mi)
- Average depth: 25 metres (82 ft) (minimum)
- Max. depth: 200 metres (660 ft)
- Settlements: Port Blair; Phuket; Krabi; Satun; Banda Aceh; Lhokseumawe; Langsa; Medan; Dumai; Batam; Langkawi; Penang; Lumut; Port Klang; Port Dickson; Malacca City; Muar; Batu Pahat; Singapore

The Strait of Malacca is a narrow stretch of water, 900 kilometres (560 mi) long and from 65 to 250 km (40 to 155 mi) wide, between the Malay Peninsula to the northeast and the Indonesian island of Sumatra to the southwest, connecting the Andaman Sea (Indian Ocean) and the South China Sea (Pacific Ocean).

As the main shipping channel between the Indian and Pacific oceans, it is one of the most important shipping lanes in the world. Over 94,000 vessels pass through the strait each year (2008) making it the busiest strait in the world, carrying approximately 25% of the world's traded goods, including oil, Chinese manufactured products, coal, palm oil, and Indonesian coffee. As of 2024, over 35% of oil transported by sea and 20% of gas flows through the strait. Because of the high volume of traffic, modern piracy and smuggling is a concern for the strait.

The strait has historically been a contested area, with regional powers, such as the Srivijaya empire, conquering the region to control the spice trade in the 7th century. Subsequent prosperous states controlling the strait include Malacca Sultanate, the Johor Sultanate, the British Straits Settlements, and the city-state of Singapore.

== Etymology ==
The name "Malacca" or original Malay Melaka (Jawi: ملاک) refers to the city of Malacca centre capital of the Malacca Sultanate. According to historical lore, its founder Parameswara, a Sumatran prince selected the site for his new kingdom named the location "Melaka" after the Malacca tree or Indian gooseberry tree (Phyllanthus emblica) under which he had rested. Over time, the name "Malacca" came to refer not only to the city but also to the strategically significant waterway between the Malay Peninsula and the opposite Sumatra.

== Extent ==
The International Hydrographic Organization define the limits of the Strait of Malacca as follows:

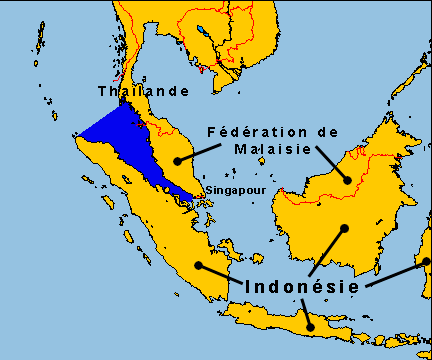
The OHI's definition of the strait.

On the west. A line joining Pedropunt, the northernmost point of Sumatra (5°40′N 95°26′E), and Lem Voalan, the southern extremity of Goh Puket [Phromthep Cape on Phuket Island] in Siam [Thailand] (7°45′N 98°18′E).

On the east. A line joining Tanjong Piai (Bulus), the southern extremity of the Malay Peninsula (1°16′N 103°31′E), and The Brothers (1°11.5′N 103°21′E), and thence to Klein Karimoen (1°10′N 103°23.5′E).

On the north. The southwestern coast of the Malay Peninsula.

On the south. The northeastern coast of Sumatra as far to the eastward as Tanjong Kedabu (1°06′N 102°58′E), thence to Klein Karimoen.

== History ==
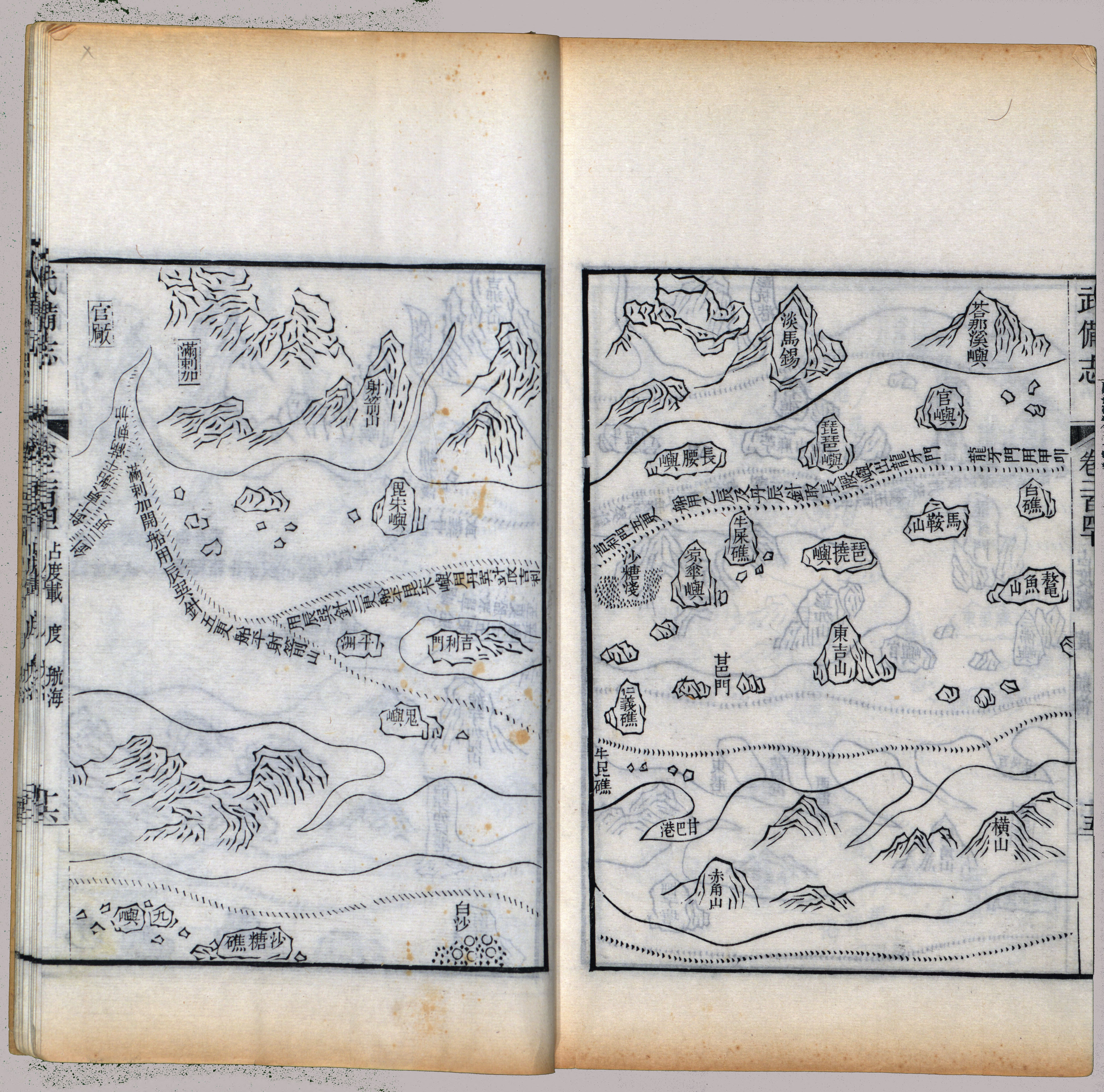
Spread of Mao Kun map in the Wubei Zhi covering many maritime features passed by Zheng He's fleets from Temasik (淡馬錫) in Singapore northwards to Malacca (滿剌加) including Mount Banang (射箭山), Pulau Berani (琵琶嶼), and Pulau Belakang Mati (長腰嶼, modern day Sentosa)

Early traders from Arabia, Africa, India and Persia reached Kedah before arriving at Guangzhou. Kedah served as a western port on the Malay Peninsula. They traded glassware, camphor, cotton goods, brocades, ivory, sandalwood, perfume, and precious stones. These traders sailed to Kedah via the monsoon winds between June and November. They returned between December and May. Kedah provided accommodations, porters, small vessels, bamboo rafts, elephants, as well as tax collections for goods to be transported overland toward eastern ports of the Malay Peninsula such as Langkasuka and Kelantan. After the tenth century, ships from China began to trade at these eastern trading posts and ports. Kedah and Funan were famous ports throughout the 6th century, before shipping began to use the Strait of Malacca itself as a trade route.

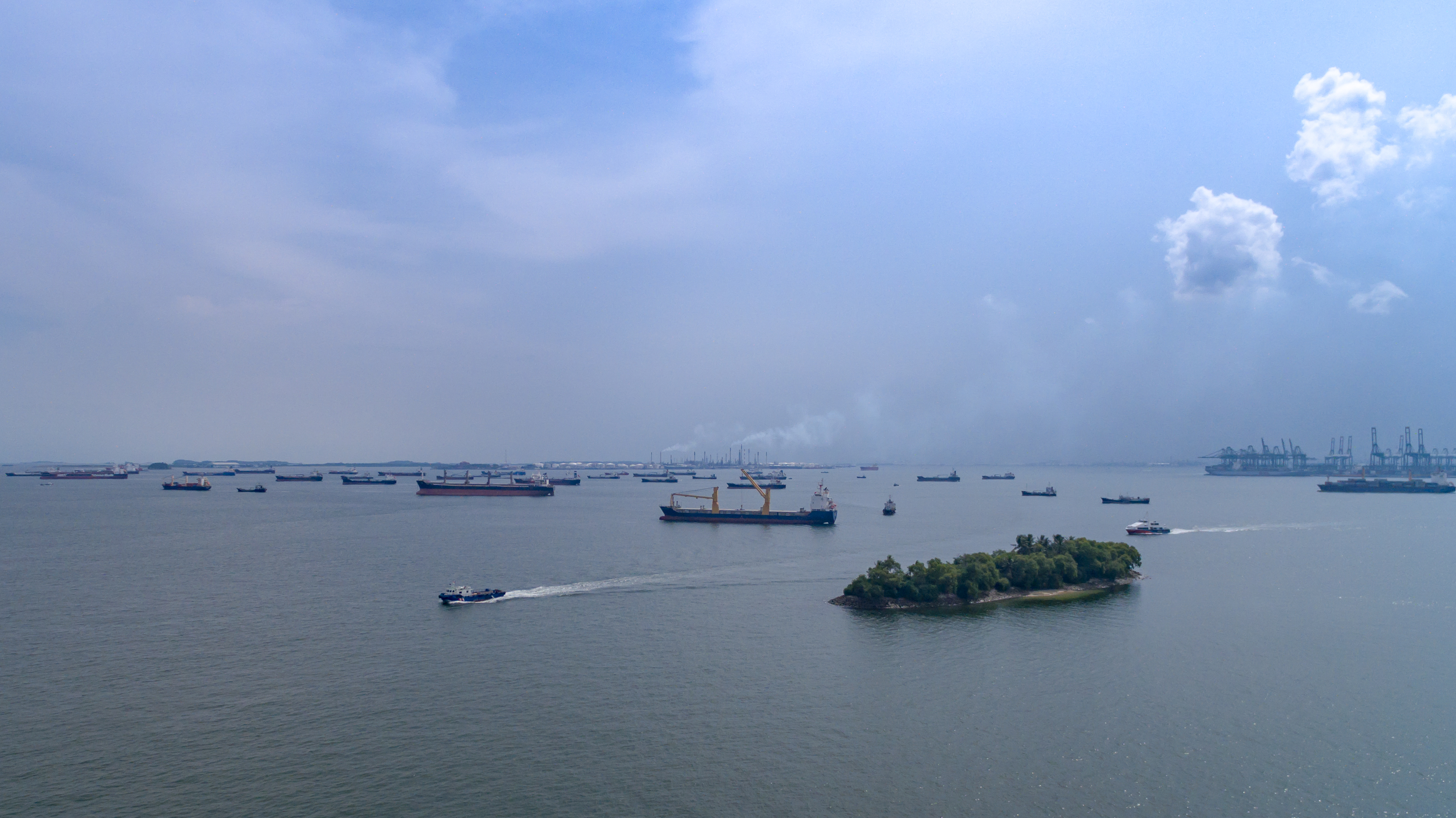
Malacca Strait

In the 7th century, the maritime empire of Srivijaya, based in Palembang, Sumatra, rose to power, and its influence expanded to the Malay Peninsula and Java. The empire gained effective control of two major choke points in maritime Southeast Asia: the Strait of Malacca and the Sunda Strait. By launching a series of conquests and raids on potential rival ports on both sides of the strait, Srivijaya ensured its economic and military domination in the region, which lasted about 700 years. Srivijaya gained great benefits from the lucrative spice trade, e.g. the tributary trade system with China, and trade with Indian and Arab merchants. The Strait of Malacca became an important maritime trade route between India and China. The importance of the Strait of Malacca in global trade networks continued well into later centuries with the rise of the Malacca Sultanate in the 15th century, the Johor Sultanate, the Straits Settlements, and the modern city-state of Singapore.

Since the 17th century, the strait has been the main shipping channel between the Indian Ocean and the Pacific Ocean. Various major regional powers have managed the straits during different historical periods.

== Economic importance ==
From an economic and strategic perspective, the Strait of Malacca is one of the most important shipping lanes in the world.

The strait is the main shipping channel between the Indian Ocean and the Pacific Ocean, linking major Asian economies such as India, Thailand, Indonesia, Malaysia, Philippines, Singapore, Vietnam, China, Japan, Taiwan, and South Korea. The Strait of Malacca is part of the Maritime Silk Road that runs from the Chinese coast towards the southern tip of India to Mombasa, from there through the Red Sea via the Suez Canal to the Mediterranean, there to the upper Adriatic region to the northern Italian hub of Trieste with its rail connections to Central Europe and the North Sea.

Over 94,000 vessels pass through the strait each year (2008) making it the busiest strait in the world, carrying about 25% of the world's traded goods, including oil, Chinese manufactured products, coal, palm oil and Indonesian coffee. As of 2024, over 35% of oil transported by sea and 20% of Gas flowed through the strait. In 2007, an estimated 13.7 million barrels per day were transported through the strait, increasing to an estimated 15.2 million barrels per day in 2011. In addition, it is also one of the world's most congested shipping choke points because it narrows to only 2.8 km (1.5 nautical miles) wide at the Phillip Channel (close to southern Singapore).

The draught of some of the world's largest ships (mostly oil tankers) exceeds the strait's minimum depth of 25 metres (82 ft). This shallow point occurs in the Singapore Strait. The maximum size of a vessel that can pass through the Strait is referred to as the Malaccamax. The next closest passageway to the east, the Sunda Strait between Sumatra and Java, is even shallower and narrower, meaning that ships exceeding the Malaccamax must detour a few thousand nautical miles and use the Lombok Strait, Makassar Strait, Sibutu Passage, and Mindoro Strait instead.

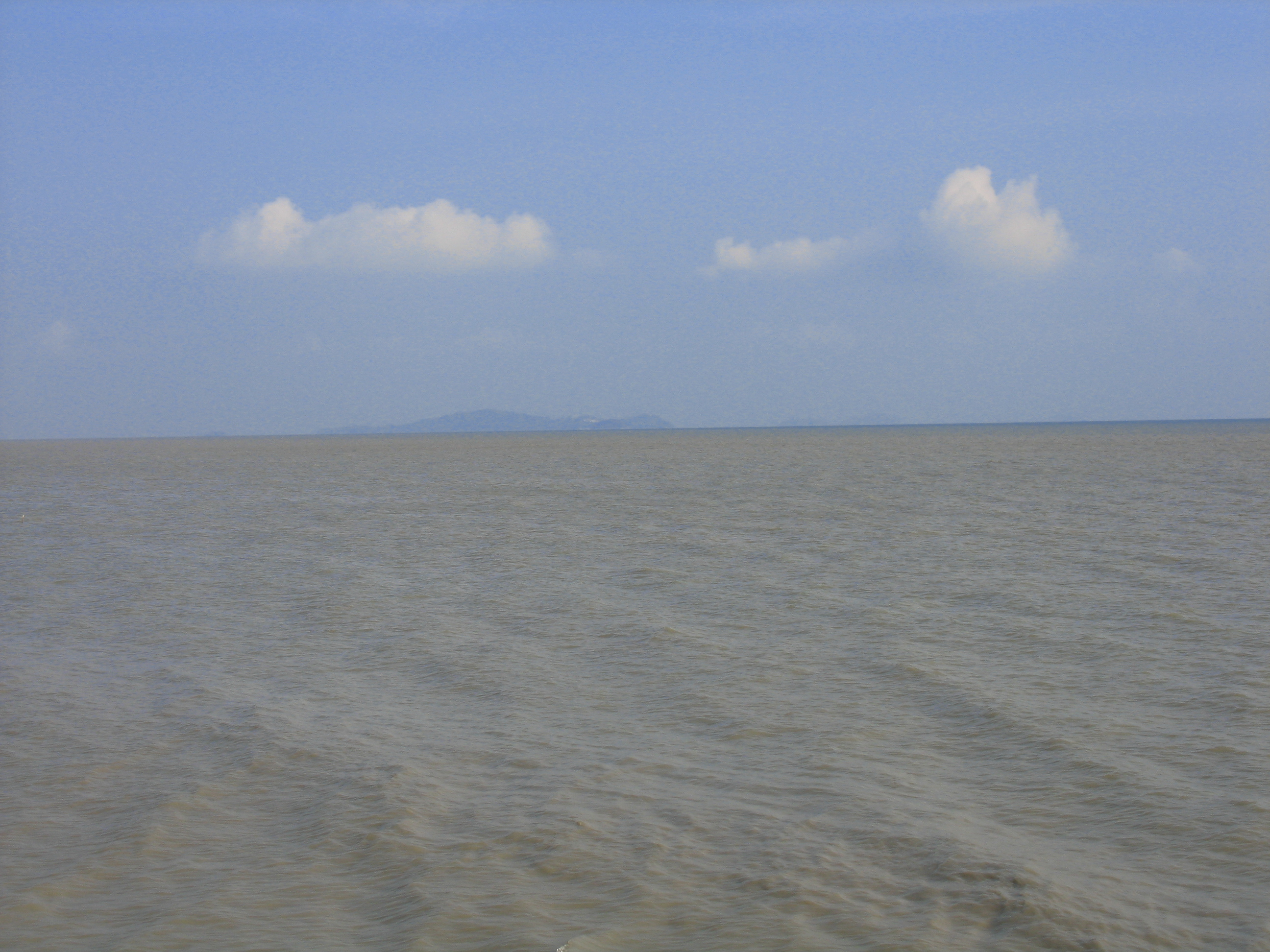
The Strait of Malacca as viewed from the city of Malacca, Malaysia. Besar Island ('Big Island') is visible in the distance.

The strategic significance of the strait has led to security concerns for major trading nations, particularly China. In 2003, Chinese president Hu Jintao coined the term "Malacca dilemma" to describe China's vulnerability to potential disruptions in energy supplies transiting the strait. With roughly 80% of China's imported crude oil passing through this narrow maritime corridor, Chinese policymakers have identified the strait as a critical chokepoint. The concept has since influenced China’s foreign policy, leading to investments in alternative energy routes and maritime security initiatives.

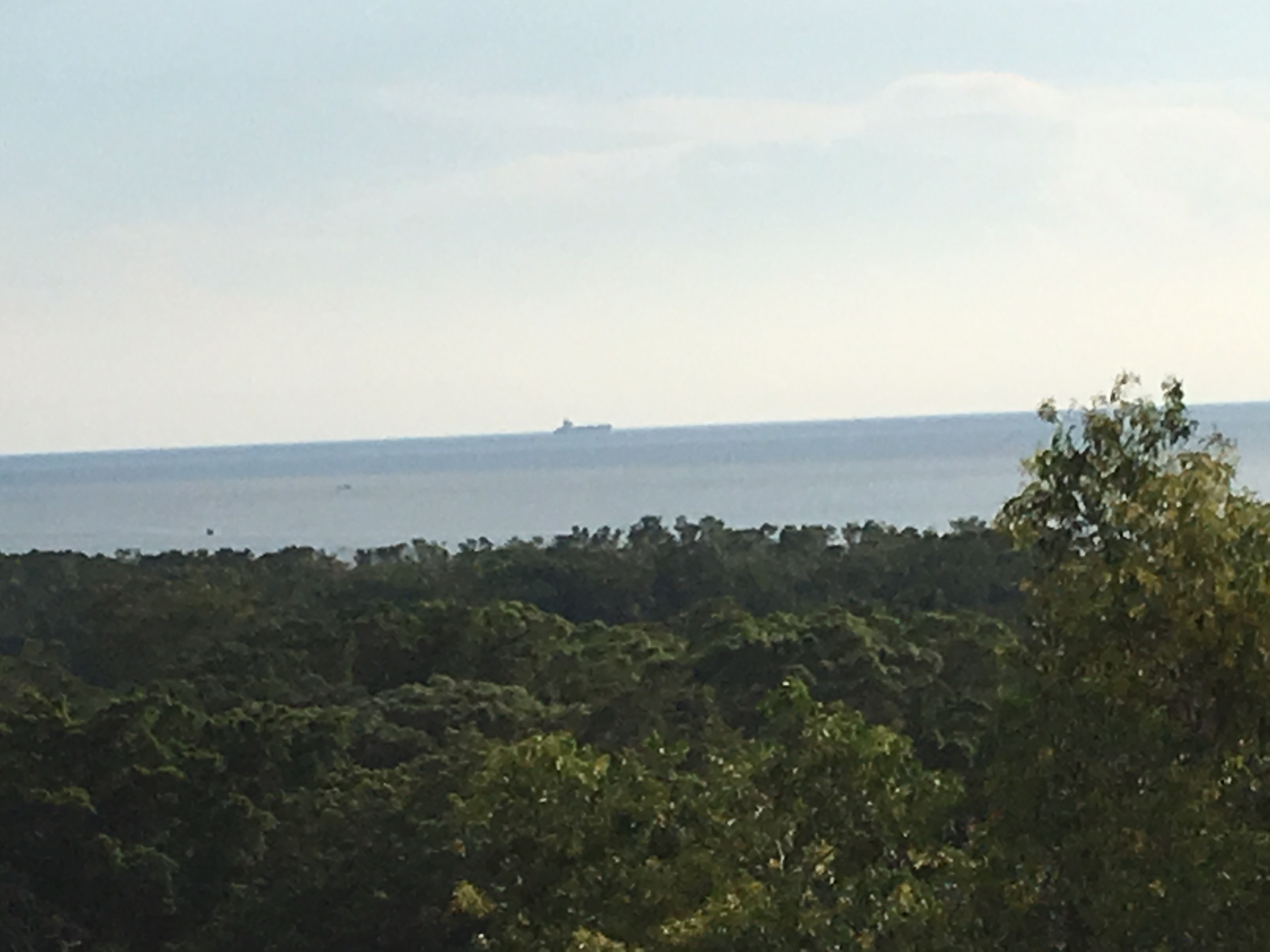
A ship sailing on the Strait of Malacca, as seen from Bukit Melawati in Kuala Selangor.

== United Nations Convention on the Law of the Sea ==
The United Nations Convention on the Law of the Sea (UNCLOS) states that each coastal state has their territorial waters from the baseline and 12 nautical miles out. The UNCLOS framework’s legal limits to maritime boundaries has at times heightened tensions in the Strait of Malacca. An example of this can be seen from several pirate attacks in the 1990's and 2000's which took place in the territorial waters of Indonesia and were thus classified as armed robbery incidents, not piracy. Indonesia lacked resources to tackle the pirates and thus territorial rivalry heightened in the area. The increase in tension made it easier for pirates to evade law enforcement by traversing the maritime border in order to avoid capture.

== Present-day maritime security ==
Due to its significant role as a vital sea lane in global trade, security in the Strait of Malacca is of great importance to several countries besides those that border it. Threats in the region are shaped by piracy, smuggling, geopolitical tension, and environmental threats like pollution and ecosystem degradation. Some of these challenges have seen a decrease in numbers, but some challenges still remain. Mainly with regards to international cooperation and environmental stability.

In 2005, the Strait of Malacca and Strait of Singapore were declared as high-risk areas due to increased attacks against passing vessels. The increase in armed robbery incidents during this period was attributed to the economic setback caused by the Asian Financial Crisis. The designation was later removed following enhanced regional cooperation between the littoral states and their naval patrols. In January 2025, it was reported that significant maritime security risks had risen. Passing ships are still advised to proceed with adequate security measures.

== International cooperation ==
=== Sovereignty versus cooperation ===
Efforts to enhance maritime security in the region are often caught in the struggle between state sovereignty and the need to further international security cooperation. The littoral states bordering the Strait of Malacca have historically been reluctant to surrender some of their sovereign control over their territorial waters and exclusive economic zone (EEZ), especially related to safe and free passage of ships, where they are not allowed to interfere.

Regional cooperation initiatives such as the Co-Operative Mechanism for Straits of Malacca and Singapore work towards promoting navigational safety and marine environment protection in the straits of Malacca and Singapore. However, in order to continuously maintain the safety of seafarers and ships passing through the strait, greater coordination is needed between the littoral states to secure the maritime domain. The three countries receive voluntary contributions from Japan, China, India, South Korea, Saudi Arabia and the United Arab Emirates that are spent on safe navigation and environment protection. As it is voluntary, it does not go against UNCLOS. It has been proposed as one of the models for the solution of the 2026 Strait of Hormuz crisis.

=== List of international organisations and agreements ===
- Malacca Strait Patrols: A cooperative security initiative launched in 2004. It includes Indonesia, Singapore, Malaysia and Thailand. The main focus of the framework is to coordinate joint naval patrols, surveillance and intelligence exchange.
- MALSINDO: A trilateral agreement between the three coastal states in the Strait of Malacca with a focus on deterring pirates through naval patrols.
- Regional Cooperation Agreement on Combating Piracy and Armed Robbery against Ships in Asia (ReCAAP): A larger agreement in its extent, its delves into information-sharing between states, capacity building and reporting.

== Shipping hazards ==
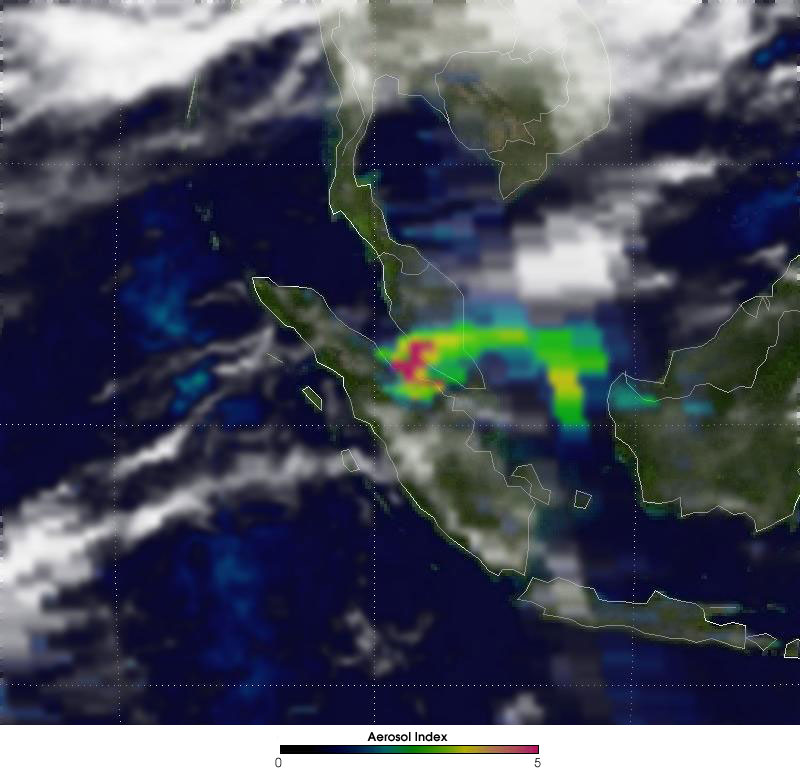
Yearly haze from the smoke of raging bush fires, limiting visibility.

Piracy has been a problem in the strait. Piracy incidents were high in frequency in the 2000s, with an additional increase after the events of September 11, 2001. After attacks rose again in the first half of 2004, regional navies stepped up their patrols of the area in July 2004. Subsequently, attacks on ships in the Strait of Malacca dropped, to 79 in 2005 and 50 in 2006. Attacks have dropped to near zero in recent years.

There have been 34 shipwrecks, some dating to the 1880s, in the local TSS channel (the channel for commercial ships under the global Traffic Separation Scheme). These pose a collision hazard in the narrow and shallow strait.

On 20 August 2017, the United States Navy destroyer USS John S. McCain lost ten of its crew's lives in a collision with the merchant ship Alnic MC a short distance east of the strait whilst its full steering capabilities had been lost. The McCain had made a series of errors in attempted mitigation, its external lights being changed to "red over red" ("vessel not under command").

Another risk is the annual haze due to wildfires in Sumatra, Indonesia. It may reduce visibility to 200 metres (660 ft), forcing ships to slow in the busy strait. The strait is frequently used by ships longer than 350 metres (1,150 ft).

== See also ==
=== Geostrategic context ===
- Andaman and Nicobar Command
- Andaman Sea
- Bay of Bengal
- Exclusive economic zone of Indonesia
- Exclusive economic zone of Malaysia
- Exclusive economic zone of Thailand
- Exclusive economic zone of India
- Singapore Strait – Strait between Indonesia, Malaysia and Singapore

=== Local context ===
- Malacca City
  - Malaccamax
  - Lingga Roads
  - Malacca Strait Bridge
- George Town, Penang
- History of Kedah
  - Kedah Sultanate
  - Action of 10 September 1782
  - Battle of Penang
  - Action of 13 November 1943
  - Action of 11 January 1944
  - Action of 14 February 1944
  - Action of 17 July 1944
  - Battle of the Malacca Strait
- Mangroves of the Straits of Malacca
- Piracy in the Strait of Malacca
