= Suezmax =

Largest ships that can transit the Suez Canal

- A Suezmax oil tanker, Seavigour, in 2017

General characteristics
- Tonnage: typically 160,000 DWT
- Length: 400 m (1,300 ft) (maximum)
- Beam: 77.5 metres (254 ft) (maximum); 50 m (164 ft) (at 20.1 m draft)
- Height: 68 m (223 ft) (maximum)
- Draft: 20.1 m (66 ft) (maximum)

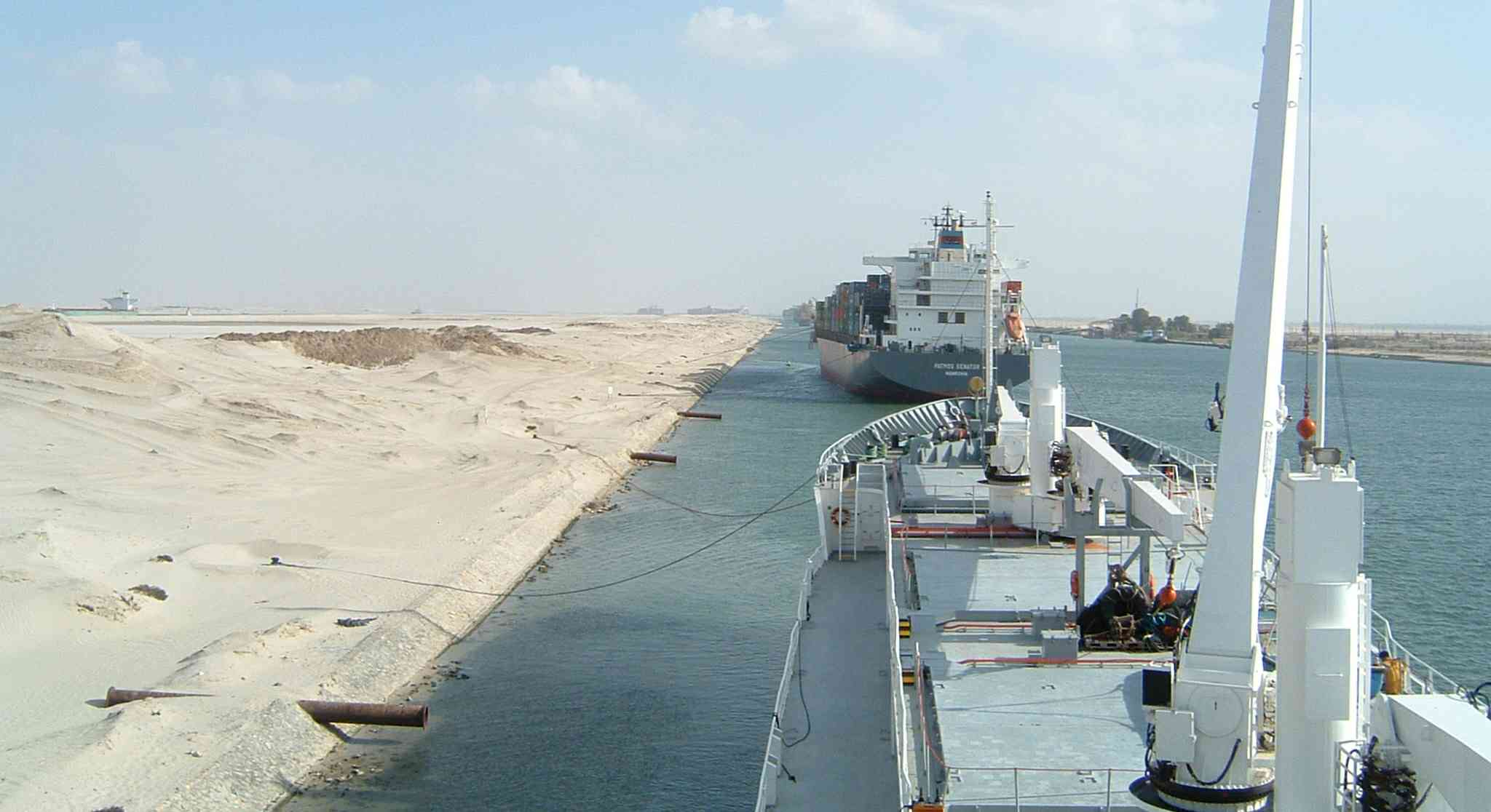
Two ships moored at El Ballah during a Suez Canal transit

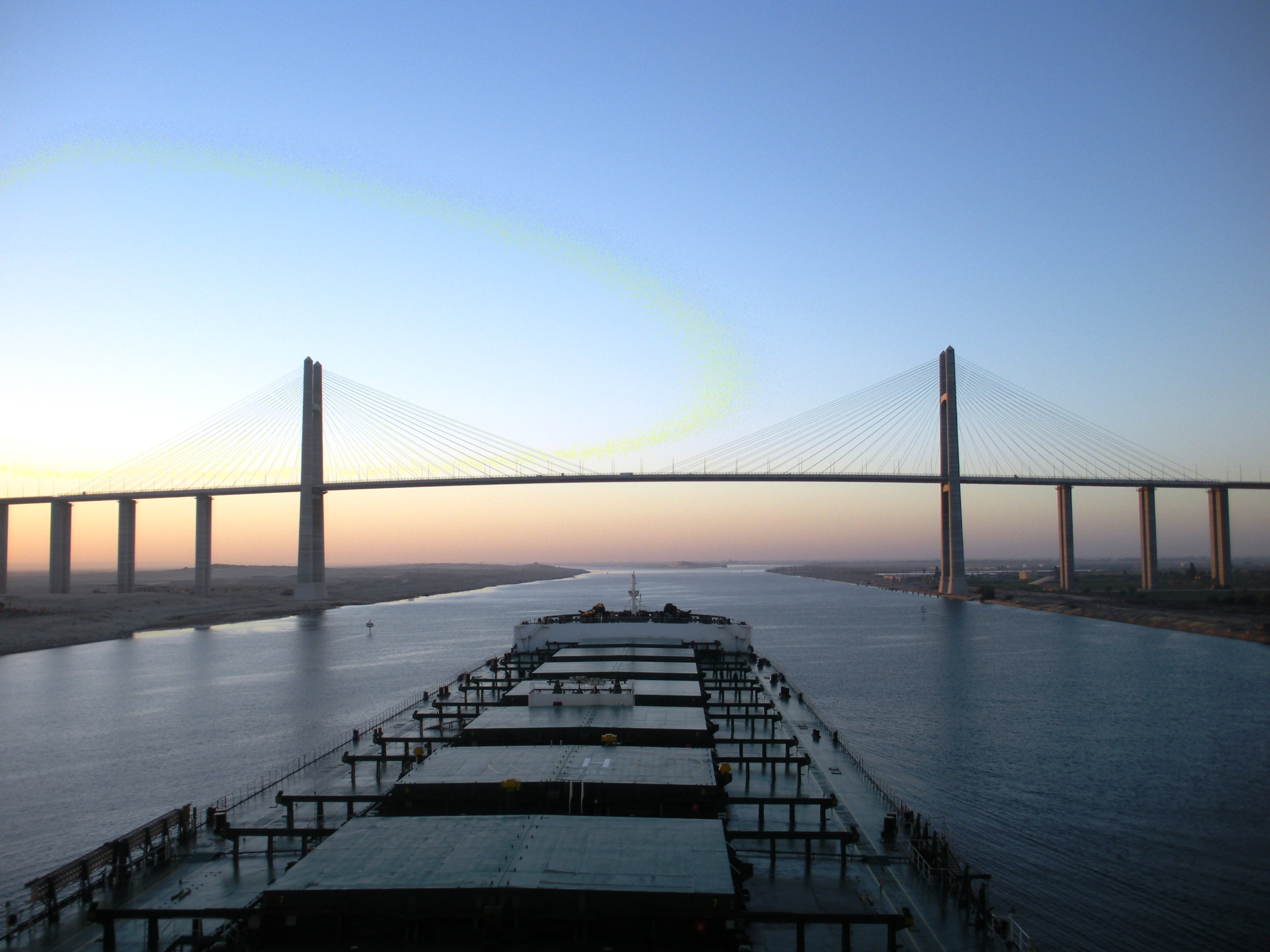
of the Suez Canal, larger ships pass through the canal – in this case, a capesize bulk carrier approaches the Egyptian–Japanese Friendship Bridge

of bounding box of Suezmax with some other ship sizes in isometric view

"Suezmax" is a naval architecture term for the largest ship measurements capable of transiting the Suez Canal in a laden condition, and is almost exclusively used in reference to tankers. The limiting factors are beam, draft, height (because of the Suez Canal Bridge), and length (even though the canal has no locks).

== Description ==
The depth of the canal allows for a maximum of 20.1 metres (66 ft) of draft, meaning that a few fully laden supertankers are too deep to fit through, and either have to unload part of their cargo to other ships ("transhipment") or to a pipeline terminal before passing through, or alternatively avoid the Suez Canal and travel around Cape Agulhas instead. The canal was deepened in 2009, increasing the draft from 18 to 20 metres (59 to 66 ft).

The typical deadweight of a Suezmax ship is about 160,000 tons; the typical beam (width) is about 48 m (157.5 ft). Also of note is the maximum head room—"air draft"—limitation of 68 m (223.1 ft), resulting from the 70-metre (230 ft) height above water of the Suez Canal Bridge. Suez Canal Authority produces tables of width and acceptable draft, which are subject to change. From 2010, the wetted surface cross sectional area of the ship is limited by 1,006 m^{2} (10,830 ft^{2}), which means 20.1 metres (66 ft) of draft for ships with the beam no wider than 50.0 metres (164.0 ft) or 12.2 metres (40 ft) of draft for ships with maximum allowed beam of 77.5 metres (254 ft).

The similar terms Panamax, Malaccamax, and Seawaymax are used for the largest ships capable of fitting through the Panama Canal, the Strait of Malacca and Saint Lawrence Seaway, respectively. The term "Chinamax" refers to vessels able to use a number of harbours while fully laden. "Capesize" refers to bulk carriers too big to pass through the Suez Canal—and needing to travel the Cape Route around the Cape of Good Hope and Cape Agulhas—but recent dredging means many Capesize vessels can use the canal. Plans to deepen the draft to 21 metres (70 ft) could lead to a redefinition of the Suezmax specification, as happened to the Panamax specification after deepening and widening of the Panama Canal.

Aframax is a freight rating, not a geographic routing limiter, for tankers are those with a capacity of 80,000 tonnes deadweight (DWT) to 120,000 DWT.

== Container ships ==
Vessels longer than 400 metres (1,300 ft) need permission from the Suez Canal Authority to transit the canal. As of 2020, the largest container ships in service all have a length of (close to) 400 metres, and a beam and draft that fit just within the limits of the canal. The ship Ever Given, which ran aground in the Canal in 2021, has Suezmax size being 399.9 metres long and with a 58.8-metre (193 ft) beam.

== See also ==
- Panamax – Size limits for ships that can transit the Panama Canal
- List of Panamax ports
- Cargo ship § Size categories
- Malaccamax – Largest ships that can transit the Strait of Malacca
- Q-Max – Ship for carrying liquefied natural gas
