= Exclusive economic zone of the Philippines =

Maritime economic zone

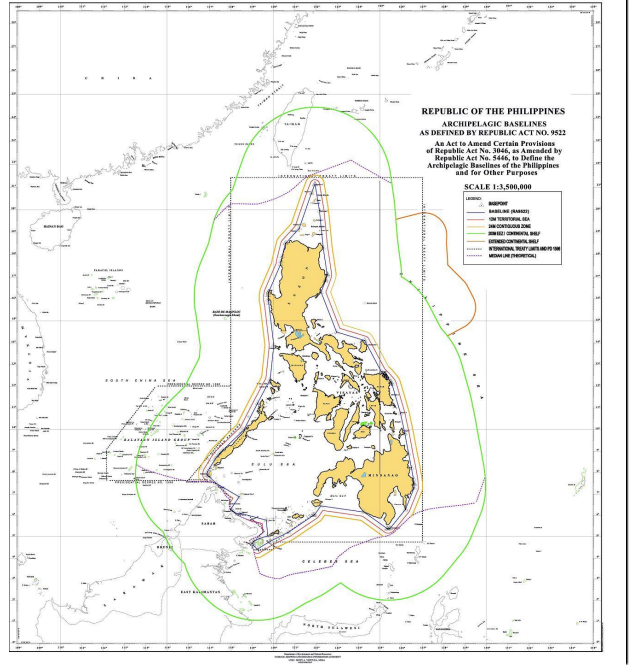
Map prepared by the National Mapping and Resource Information Authority (NAMRIA), showing the maximum extent of the Philippine EEZ in green and the theoretical EEZ based on median lines with neighboring states in purple

The exclusive economic zone of the Philippines (Philippine EEZ) is a maritime area established pursuant to the United Nations Convention on the Law of the Sea (UNCLOS) and Philippine laws and regulations, primarily Republic Act No. 9522 of 2009. It covers 2,263,816 square kilometers (874,064 sq mi) of sea. The Philippines comprises 7,641 islands that form the Philippine archipelago. The zone extends between 116° 40' and 126° 34' E longitude and 4° 40' and 21° 10' N latitude. It is bordered by the Philippine Sea to the east and north, the South China Sea to the west, and the Celebes Sea to the south.

== West Philippine Sea ==
On September 12, 2012, President Benigno Aquino III issued Administrative Order No. 29, designating the maritime areas on the western side of the Philippine archipelago and within the Philippine EEZ as the West Philippine Sea and mandating the use of that designation by all departments, subdivisions, agencies and instrumentalities of the Philippine government. The term West Philippine Sea has sometimes been incorrectly used to refer to the whole of the South China Sea.

== Disputes ==
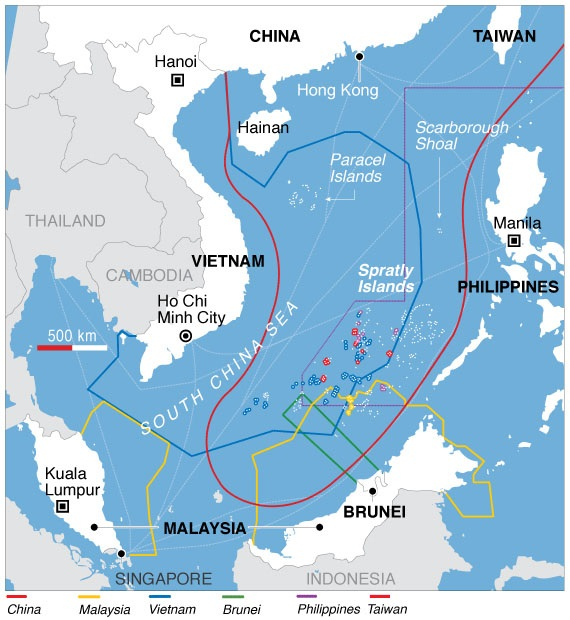
Territorial claims in the South China Sea. The Philippines's EEZ (including overlapping claims) is marked by purple line.

The Philippines has territorial disputes in the South China Sea, mainly with the People's Republic of China. Nearly the whole South China Sea is claimed by China with its nine-dash line. This contested line cuts half of the Philippines' EEZ. In 2011, President Benigno Aquino III stated that "China's nine-dash line territorial claim over the entire South China Sea is against international laws, particularly the United Nations Convention on the Law of the Sea (UNCLOS)". In 2013, China began building artificial islands and military bases on reefs in the Spratly Islands and on Scarborough Shoal, which it seized in 2012. As of 2019, China controls 20 outposts in the Paracel Islands and 7 in the Spratlys.

In July 2016, the Arbitral Tribunal set up under Annex VII of the United Nations Convention on the Law of the Sea in the Hague ruled against China's nine-dash line demarcation. As the Council on Foreign Relations wrote at the time, "The panel found that China’s claims of historic rights within the nine-dash line, which Beijing uses to demarcate its claims in the South China Sea, were without legal foundation. The panel also concluded that Beijing’s activities within the Philippines’ two-hundred-nautical-mile exclusive economic zone (EEZ), such as illegal fishing and environmentally ruinous artificial island construction, infringed on Manila's sovereign rights."

On June 12, 2019, a Chinese vessel collided with and sank an anchored Philippine fishing boat (F/B Gem-Ver 1) near Recto Bank in the South China Sea. The Chinese vessel did not save the 22 Filipino fishermen on-board according to the Philippine Department of National Defense. A couple of minutes later, they were rescued by a Vietnamese fishing boat. The Armed Forces of the Philippines said the collision was "far from accidental."

On April 15, 2021, the National Task Force for the West Philippine Sea (NTF-WPS) reported that approximately 240,000 kilos (260 tons) of fish have been illegally taken by Chinese fishing vessels in the South China Sea every day. The Chinese fishing vessels illegally operate around the Union Banks and Thitu Island (Pag-asa Islands). The overfishing causes the depletion of marine resources. During the same month, an estimated 240 Chinese vessels were patrolling throughout the South China Sea.

In November 2021, two Filipino military supply boats were blocked by three Chinese coast guard ships which also fired water cannons. The supply vessels were headed to Second Thomas Shoal within the exclusive economic zone of the Philippines. The atoll has been occupied by a Philippine military contingent since 1999. The incident was strongly condemned by Philippine Foreign Secretary Teodoro Locsin and former Philippine President Rodrigo Duterte.

On 7 June, 2025, a Chinese maritime militia vessel with hull number 16838 ran aground at Pag-asa Reef 1, located 2.6 kilometers from Pag-asa Island within the Philippines’ territorial waters in the West Philippine Sea. Before being escorted away by Chinese Coast Guard ships, the vessel deployed a nylon parachute anchor that dragged across the seabed, damaging approximately 30% of the reef and covering 307 square meters of coral. Philippine authorities, including the Palawan Council for Sustainable Development, Western Philippines University, and the Philippine Coast Guard, conducted an underwater assessment and estimated the damage at ₱11.1 million. The incident occurred within a maximum protection zone under Republic Act No. 7611, where all human activity is prohibited. The anchor, which remained underwater, continued to harm marine life and coral ecosystems by blocking sunlight and producing microplastics.

== See also ==
- Exclusive economic zone of Vietnam
- Exclusive economic zone of Malaysia
