= Lombok Strait =

Strait in Indonesia

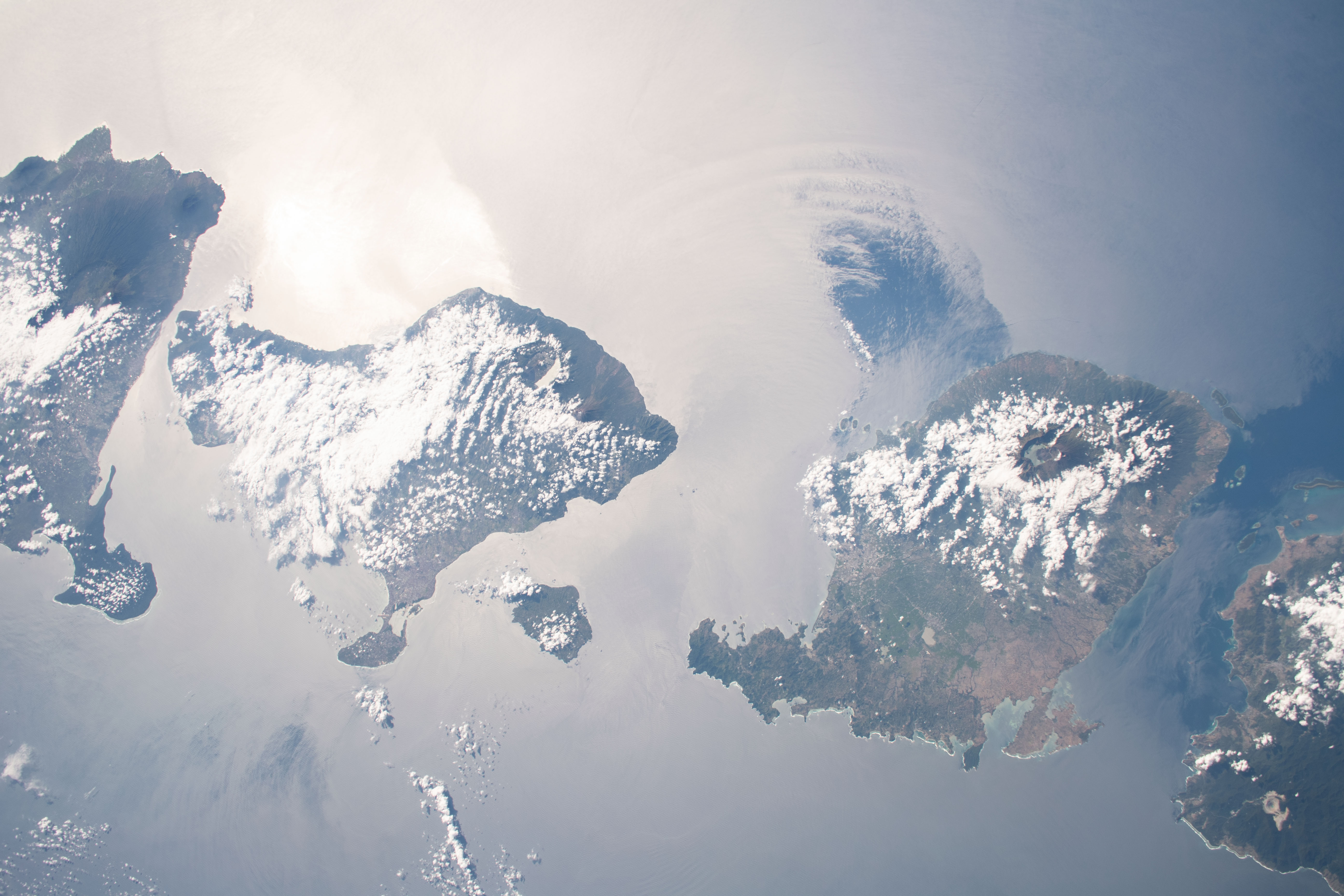
- Lombok Strait seen from the International Space Station

- Location within Indonesia

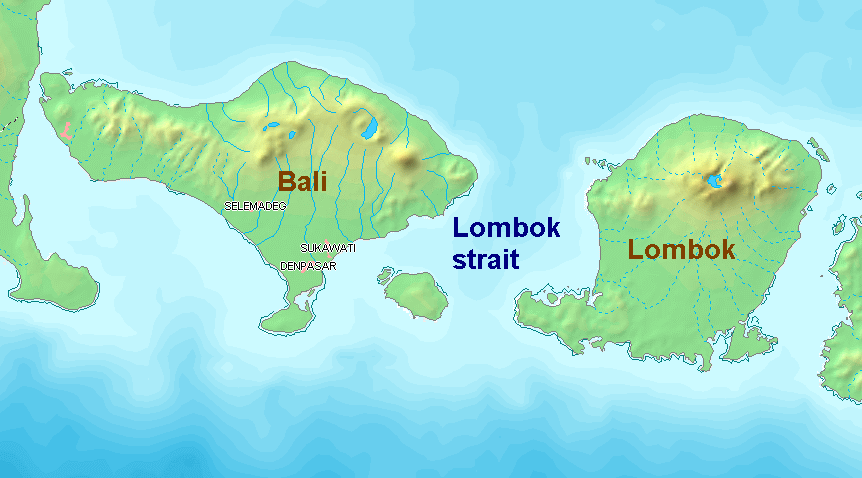
- Coordinates: 8°46′S 115°44′E
- Type: Strait
- Ocean/sea sources: Indian Ocean and Bali Sea
- Basin countries: Indonesia
- Max. length: 60 km (37 mi)
- Max. width: 40 km (25 mi)
- Min. width: 20 km (12 mi)
- Average depth: 250 m (820 ft)
- Islands: Bali Lombok Gili Islands Nusa Penida

The Lombok Strait (Indonesian: Selat Lombok) is a strait of the Bali Sea connecting to the Indian Ocean, and is located between the islands of Bali and Lombok in Indonesia. The Gili Islands are on the Lombok side.

Its narrowest point is at its southern opening, with a width of about 20 km (12 miles) between the islands of Lombok and Nusa Penida, in the middle of the strait. At the northern opening, it is 40 km (25 miles) across. Its total length is about 60 km (37 miles). As it is minimum 250 m (820 feet) deep—much deeper than the Strait of Malacca—ships that draw too much water to pass through the Malacca Strait (so-called "post Malaccamax" vessels) often use the Lombok Strait instead.

The Lombok Strait is notable as one of the main passages for the Indonesian Throughflow (ITF) that exchanges water between the Indian Ocean and the Pacific Ocean.

It is also part of the biogeographical boundary between the fauna of the Indomalayan realm and the distinctly different fauna of Australasia. The boundary is known as the Wallace Line, for Alfred Russel Wallace, who first remarked upon the striking difference between animals of Indomalaya and those of Australasia, and how abrupt the boundary was between the two biomes.

Biologists believe it was the depth of the Lombok Strait itself that kept the animals on either side isolated from one another. When sea levels dropped during the Pleistocene ice age, the islands of Bali, Java and Sumatra were all connected to one another and to the mainland of Asia. They shared the Asian fauna. The Lombok Strait's deep water kept Lombok and the Lesser Sunda archipelago isolated from the Asian mainland. These islands were, instead, colonised by Australasian fauna.

== Marine biodiversity ==
The Lombok Strait is abundant of flora and fauna species which have been well explored through Bali's diving tourism. As the Lombok Strait connects the Bali Sea to the Indian Ocean, the abundance of flora and fauna is due to its location between the Indian Ocean and the Pacific Ocean, where the strait acts as a passage for currents. Accompanied by its flora and fauna is its marine habitats which vary in water temperature, its presence of volcanic and limestone sediments, local freshwater inflow between creeks, sandy reef slopes, and strong currents. According to the results obtained from a coral reef expedition conducted by the National Museum of Natural History-Naturalis Leiden, in partnership with the Research and Development Centre for Oceanology of the Indonesian Institute of Sciences (PPPO-LIPI), Jakarta, and the WWF Indonesia-Wallacea Bioregion, Bali in April 2001, the coral reef fauna of the Lombok Strait was one of the most diverse and richest in the world. The diversity of its marine biogeography includes the following groups: stony corals (Scleractinia and hydrocorals), soft corals (Octocorallia), sponges (Porifera), forams (Foramanifera), shrimps (Decapoda), snails (Gastropoda), and fishes.

The Lombok Strait is part of the biogeographical boundary between the fauna of the Indomalayan realm and the distinctly different fauna of Australasia. The boundary is known as the Wallace Line, for Alfred Russel Wallace, who first remarked upon the striking difference between animals of Indomalaya and those of Australasia, and how abrupt the boundary was between the two biomes. When sea levels dropped during the Pleistocene ice age, the islands of Bali, Java and Sumatra were all connected to one another and to the mainland of Asia. They shared the Asian fauna. The Lombok Strait's deep water kept Lombok and the Lesser Sunda archipelago isolated from the Asian mainland. These islands were instead, colonised by Australasian fauna.

The ocean surrounding the Indonesian archipelago is inhabited by 30 marine mammals. The diverse range of mammals include rare and endangered whales and dolphins. The endangered status of marine mammals in Indonesian waters is a consequence of the extreme fisheries activities undertaken along the strait waters, such as coastal net-entanglements and reef bombing. The statistics of fisheries activities along Indonesian waters was that an annual catch of more than 4.5 million tonnes occurred in 2006 and the catches between 1996-1997 included 1424 manta rays, 18 whale sharks, 312 other shark species, 4 minke whales, 326 dolphins, 577 pilot whales, 789 marlin, 84 turtles, and 9 dugongs. The Lombok Strait is abundantly inhabited by the longnosed spinner dolphin (S. longirostris) and is commonly inhabited by the pantropical spotted dolphin (S. attenuata), bottlenose dolphin (T. truncatus), and the Southeast Asian spinner dolphin (Stenella longirostris roseiventris). The habitat of these cetacean species consist of large rivers, mangroves, and coastal environments.

Marine bacterial isolates are formed as a result of petroleum hydrocarbon contamination. According to a cruise investigation of the Indian Ocean and Lombok Strait conducted by the Institute for Marine Research and Observation, Ministry of Marine Affairs and Fisheries (BPOL-KKP), the bacteria present in the marine environment of Indonesia consisted of: Aeromonas sp., Pseudomonas sp., Bacillus sp., B. megaterium and Corynebacterium sp., through the enumeration and isolation of oil-degrading bacteria. Five distinct hydrocarbonoclastic marine bacterial species and two species from the Bacillus genera family, are bacterial strains that have been identified in the Lombok Strait. These bacterial strains have the potential to remediate the marine environment. The bacterial strains existing in Indonesian waters, including the Indian Ocean and the Lombok Strait, degrade polycyclic aromatic hydrocarbons (PAHs). This is because majority of the world's crude oil are traded along the route of the Lombok Strait. The cultivable marine hydrocarbonoclastic bacteria identified in the Lombok Strait specifically have six morphologies: LS-3, LS-13, LS-14, LS-15, LS-16, and LS-20. These colonies are discovered to have smooth and rippled surfaces and are of convex and raised elevation. They are found to be of various colours: yellow, opaque, white, and purple. Callidiopini species are identified to have been found on the islands of Bali and Lombok, which are divided by the Lombok Strait. One species of the Callidiopine fauna, Diatomocephala larvata (Ceresium larvatum) is unique to the Lombok Strait.

== Oceanic features ==
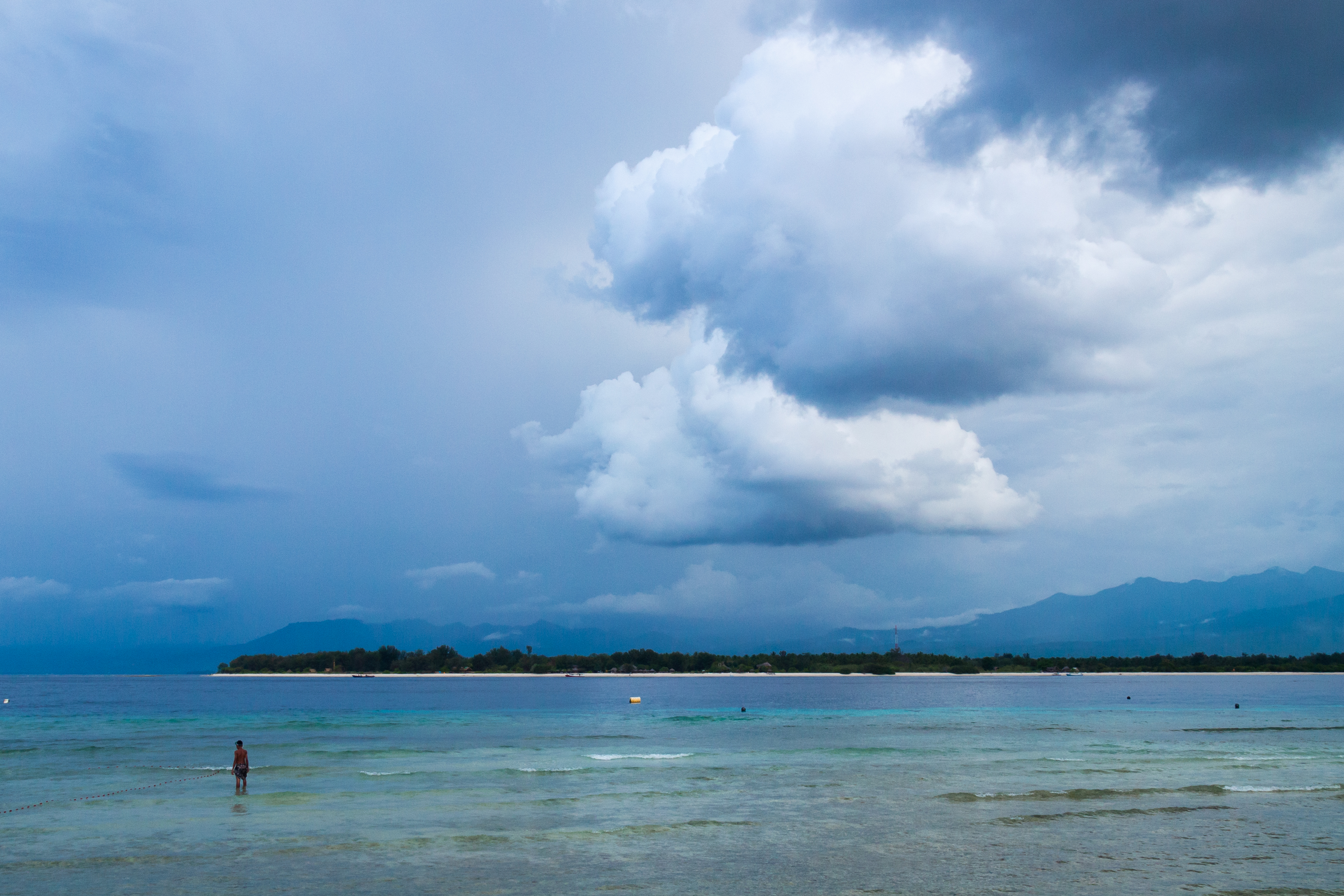
Lombok Strait, Gili Islands

The Lombok Strait is notable as one of the main passages for the Indonesian Throughflow (ITF) that exchanges water between the Indian Ocean and the Pacific Ocean. The formation of the Lombok Strait is influenced by oceanic tidal mixing, heat content of the water masses, and seasonal changes. As the Lombok Strait is situated between Bali and Lombok, it is an exit way for the Indonesian Throughflow (ITF) which connects the Pacific Ocean and the Indian Ocean. As a result of this, oceanic tidal mixing occurs. Oceanic tidal mixing occurs in shallow seas and near-coastal areas. Tidal mixing can induce an oscillation in sea surface temperatures (SST) during the near-fortnightly spring-neap period. Tidal mixing in the waters of the Indonesian archipelago is particularly intense due to the rough topography in the Lifamatola, Manipa, Ombai, and Lombok Straits, and the Sibutu Island chains. The Lombok Strait is a strong tidal mixing hotspot. This is because numerical simulations have shown that there is a large conversion of semidiurnal M2 barotropic to baroclinic internal tides surrounding the Nusa Penida Sill (NPS).

The Indonesian Throughflow (ITF) affects the climate of the region as it regulates the position of hot pools in the Indian Ocean. Climate change occurs as the Indonesian Throughflow (ITF) contributes to the contained heat content in the strait and its sea surface temperatures (SST). The location of the strait causes the heat content of the water masses to be influenced by the monsoon season in Asia, and El-Niño Southern Oscillation (ENSO) and Indian Ocean Dipole (IOD) which are climate phenomena. Moreover, the monsoon season from December to May causes precipitation to occur and fresh water to form at the Java Sea, which in turn, influences the salinity of the Lombok Strait. This makes the Lombok Strait distinct from other bodies of water along the Lesser Sunda Islands chain. The ocean heat content of the Lombok Strait is determined by ocean-atmosphere interactions. This is crucial to climate change because heat is mostly absorbed by the oceans, which cover 70% of the earth's surface. An increase in ocean heat content accompanied by the melting of ice caps, leads to an increase in sea levels, which ultimately results to a disruption in ecosystems and the lifestyles of human life. The fortnightly cycles of the ocean's sea surface temperatures (SST) and Bali's atmosphere have a peak seasonal cycle, which takes place during boreal summer.

The monsoon season also determines the wave properties of the Lombok Strait. The arc-like internal wave and the irregular internal wave are wave patterns which occur as a result of seasonal influences. The tide flow is controlled through Nusa Penida Sill (NPS), reaching 350 m in depth. The Lombok Strait features strong semi-diurnal tides of ~90 m in amplitude with a distance of 30 km from the Nusa Penida Sill (NPS). The flow of the strait waters also makes it distinctive as it consists of a layered structure: the upper layer has a permanent southward flow and the lower layer has a reversing southward-northward flow.

== Maritime issues ==
As the Lombok Strait borders Indonesia, it is affected by maritime issues related to international trade. The UN Secretary General has identified seven threats to maritime security in the Report on Oceans and the Law of the Sea 2008, which are: terrorist acts against shipping, offshore installations and other maritime interests, illicit trafficking in weapons of mass destruction, illicit trafficking in drugs, human trafficking, IUU fishing, and unlawful damage to the marine environment. Issues particularly affecting the Lombok Strait include: piracy, illegal fishing, human trafficking, smuggling of goods, armed robberies and terrorism. The International Chamber of Commerce (ICC) reports that Indonesia had the highest incidents of piracy and armed robbery offshore. Maritime threats experienced by Indonesian waters is due to increasing economic development in the Asia-Pacific region, making Asia the most vulnerable place in the world in terms of security. As it is minimum 250 m (820 feet) deep—much deeper than the Strait of Malacca—ships that draw too much water to pass through the Malacca Strait (so-called "post Malaccamax" vessels) often use the Lombok Strait, instead. The Lombok Strait is proposed to become an alternative route for Chinese trading vessels passing the Malacca Strait. Indonesian waters also host four of the world's nine choke points. These four choke points are used for national and international shipping routes. Indonesia as an archipelago, is responsible for maintaining security in the international shipping routes of the Archipelagic Sea Lanes (ASL), as stated by the 1982 United Nations Convention on Law of the Sea (UNCLOS).

Due to the maritime issues experienced along the Lombok Strait, there is a need for Indonesia to establish management strategies. The strategies Indonesia has put in place to deal with maritime issues involves a policy established by President Joko Widodo, known as the Global Maritime Fulcrum. The policy is based on five pillars: redeveloping Indonesia's maritime culture, building the maritime industry, prioritising fisheries, increasing shipping and port networks, improving maritime diplomacy and its defence forces. Improving defence forces at sea involves an emphasis in using the Indonesian navy to increase maritime security. Another strategy put in place by the Indonesian Government are designating areas called Marine Protective Areas (MPAs). As part of the internal policy in 2019, the Lombok Strait was announced to have been intended to be established as a Particularly Sensitive Sea Area (PSSA). It has not been officially submitted to the International Maritime Organisation (IMO). Alongside implementing Particularly Sensitive Sea Areas (PSSA) as a maritime strategy for the Lombok Strait, is the Traffic Separation Scheme (TSS) by the International Maritime Organisation (IMO), which is a traffic management route system. The Traffic Separation Scheme (TSS) supports Indonesia being recognised as an archipelagic state under the 1982 UNCLOS, as it aligns with Article 53 (6), which states the country's right to improve navigation safety within the area of the Islands Sea Channel.

== Contribution to the economy ==
The Lombok Strait contributes to the economy of Indonesia and neighbouring Southeast Asian countries as it serves as a trading route alongside the Strait of Malacca, and as the island of Lombok transforms into a hub of tourism. According to Rizal Ramli, Coordinating Minister for Maritime Affairs and Natural Resources in Indonesia, the Lombok Strait is proposed to become an alternative shipping route in place of the Malacca Strait. This is because the "Strait of Malacca has become narrow and shallower, and shipping traffic has become busy each year, which would increase the risk of vessel collisions." With businesses supporting this shift, this would result in Indonesia becoming one of the world's biggest bunkering ports alongside Singapore.

As the Malacca Strait would no longer be able to cope with shipping traffic by the next 10–20 years, the Indonesian Government encourages voyages to pass through the Lombok Strait instead. As a result of increased shipping activity, the issue of maritime threats and marine pollution are introduced. In response to these arising maritime issues, the Indonesian Government has proposed to establish Particularly Sensitive Sea Areas (PSSA) in its internal policy. Establishing the Lombok Strait as a Particularly Sensitive Sea Area (PSSA) contributes to the growth of the tuna fishing industry. This is due to the location of the Lombok Strait, as it is situated within the triangle of coral reefs (CT) area. The rich marine biodiversity of the Coral Triangle (CT) area is an essential tuna breeding ground for the outsourcing of the world's tuna fishing industry. The growth of the tuna fishing industry in turn, contributes to the economy as it provides food security and income for residents along the coastline of Coral Triangle (CT) areas, and because the tuna breeding sites are foundational sources for tuna fishing companies who are producing tuna for consumers around the world. Healthy marine resources such as tuna breeding grounds further contribute to the growth of the tourism industry, as a result of establishing the Lombok Strait as a Particularly Sensitive Sea Area (PSSA).

== Gallery of nearby important channels ==
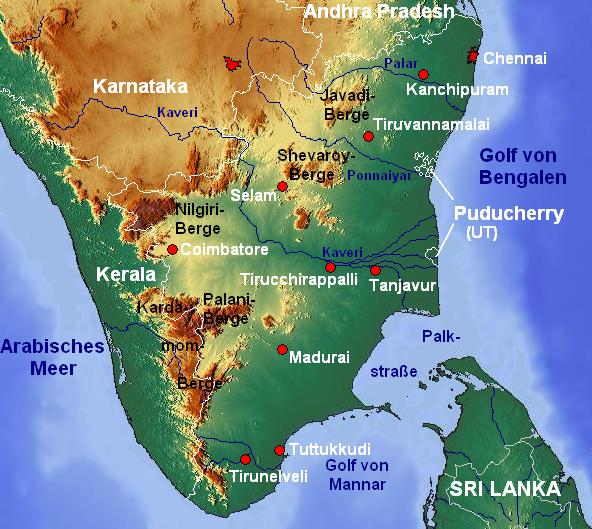
Gulf of Mannar

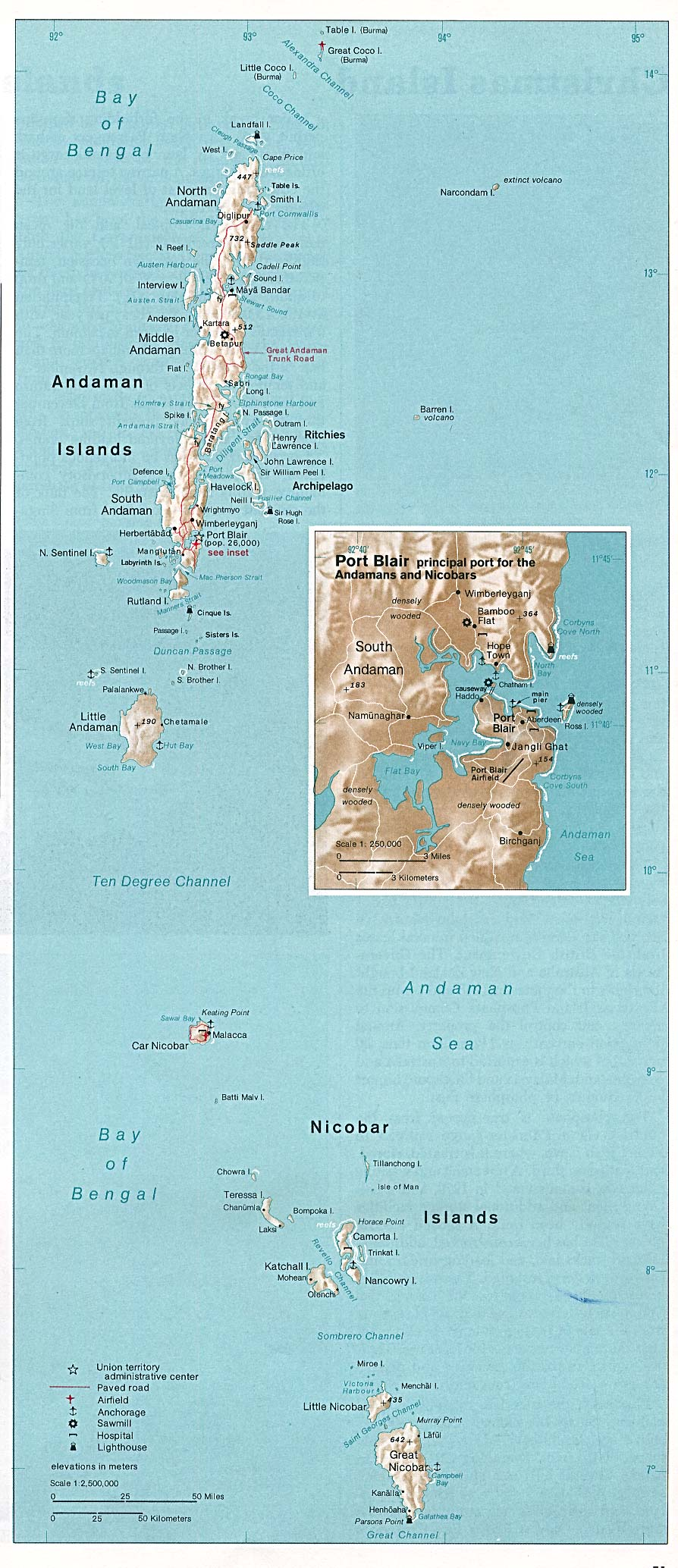
Cocos Strait, Duncan Passage and other Indian channels

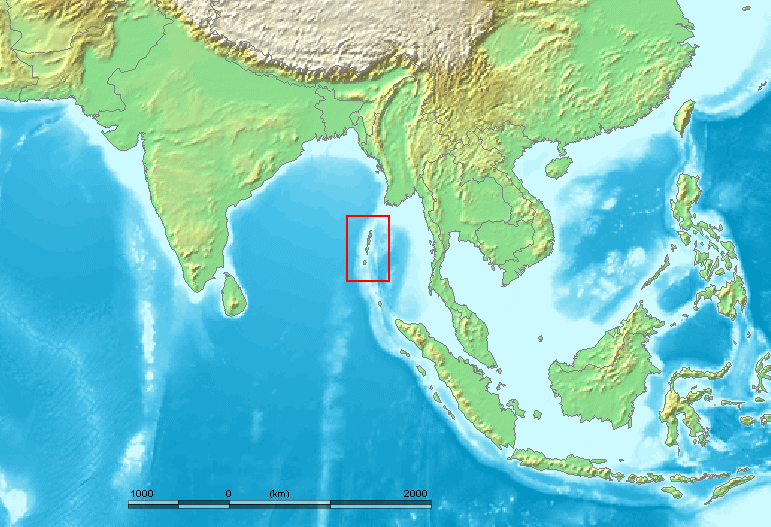
Cocos Strait is at the northern end of Andaman Islands in red square

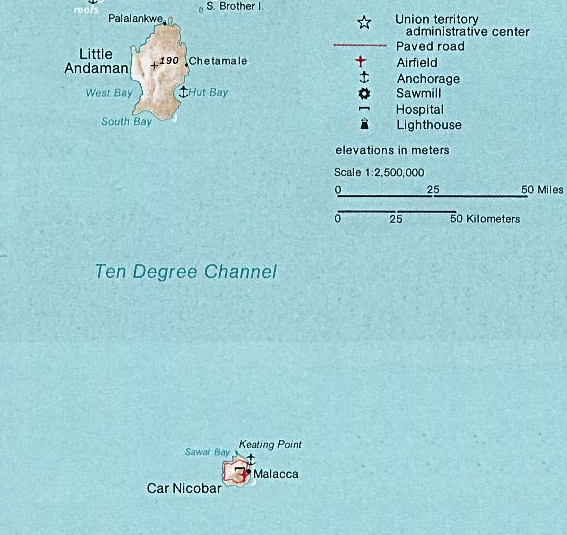
Ten Degrees Channel, closeup

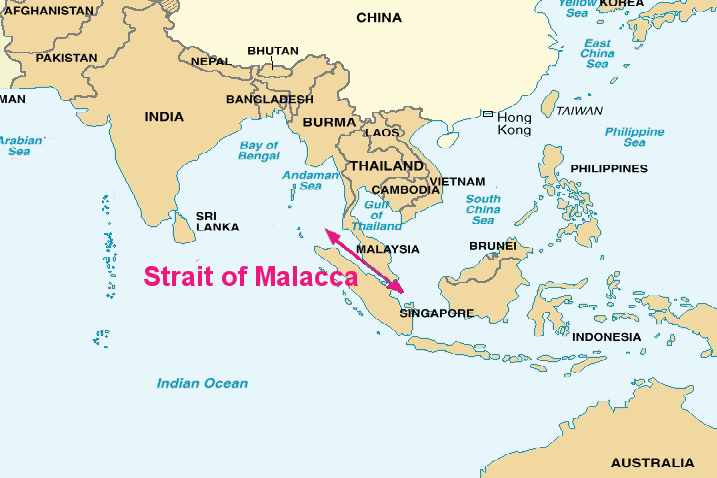
Malacca Strait

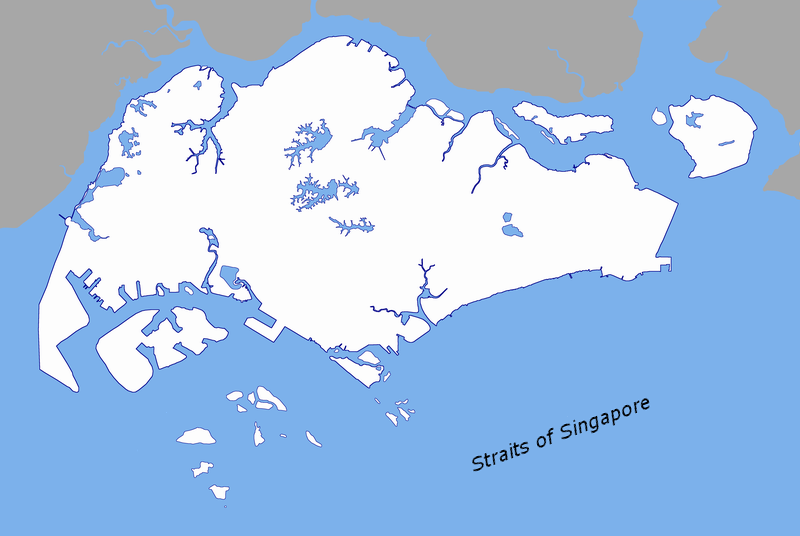
Singapore Strait

Sunda Strait

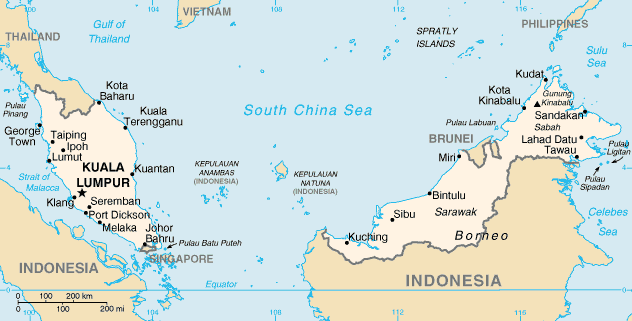
South China Sea, Malacca Strait, Gulf of Thailand, Sulu Sea, Celebes Sea

== See also ==
Geostrategic context

- Andaman and Nicobar Command
- Andaman Sea
- Bay of Bengal
- Exclusive economic zone of Indonesia
- Exclusive economic zone of India

Local context

- Alas Strait, on the opposite side (east) of Lombok
- Sunda Strait
- Makassar Strait
- Wallace Line
