= Exclusive economic zone of Vietnam =

Economic zone exclusive to Vietnam

The exclusive economic zones of the Vietnam in red

Vietnam claims an exclusive economic zone (EEZ) of 1,395,096 km^{2} (538,650 sq mi) with 200 nautical miles (370.4 km; 230.2 mi) from its shores.

Excluding all disputed waters, Vietnam has an undisputed exclusive economic zone of 417,663 km^{2} (161,261 sq mi). This figure does not include the EEZ areas of the Paracel Islands and the Spratly Islands. Vietnam has disputes mainly with the People's Republic of China due to the nine-dash line.

Vietnam has the 33rd longest coastline of 3,260 km (2,030 mi). It includes much of the western area of the South China Sea and parts of the southern area bordering Malaysia and Brunei's EEZs. The total land area, including inland bodies of water, of Vietnam is 331,212 km^{2} (127,882 sq mi). (Note: See: List of countries and dependencies by area) Vietnam has dozens of islands. Phú Quốc is the largest island with 574 square kilometres (222 sq mi).

== Disputes ==
This map continues to be used in news media, but Vietnam does not in fact claim EEZ to the blue line, which is an extrapolation based on projection from the Paracel Islands, which Vietnam avoided in its 2009 submissions to CLCS. The more accurate illustration of Vietnamese claims can be found in the image that is attached at the beginning of this article.

Vietnam's disputes are mainly with the People's Republic of China. Vietnam rejects China's nine-dash line which extends much further than China's 200 nautical miles (370.4 km; 230.2 mi) from its shores. The nine-dash line cuts straight through Vietnam's Exclusive Economic Zone in the South China Sea and would reduce Vietnam's EEZ by 3/4th. This line also cuts the EEZ of the Philippines and Malaysia in half. Brunei would lose 90% of its EEZ. According to former Philippine President Benigno Aquino III, "China's nine-dash line territorial claim over the entire South China Sea is against international laws, particularly the United Nations Convention of the Laws of the Sea (UNCLOS)". Vietnam also rejected the Chinese claim, citing that it is baseless and against the UNCLOS.

In the spring of 2014, China and Vietnam clashed over China's Haiyang Shiyou oil rig in Vietnam's EEZ. The incident left seventeen Vietnamese injured and damaged both China's and Vietnam's ships.

=== Paracel and Spratly Islands ===
The Paracel Islands and the Spratly Islands were recognized as part of Vietnam in 1954. The Geneva Accords of 1954, which ended the First Indochina War, gave South Vietnam control of the Vietnamese territories south of the 17th Parallel, which included the islands in the Paracels and Spratlys, at least according to Vietnam interpretations.

In 1974, during the Vietnam War, the PRC used military force in the Paracel Islands and took Yagong Island and the Crescent group of reefs from South Vietnam. Since the 1990s China still occupies and controls all of the Paracel Islands. The PRC controls all of the features in the Paracels.

Vietnam controls 29 features of the Spratly Islands. However, since 2013 China has been constructing artificial islands on reefs and military bases which changed the balance of power in favour of the PRC in the South China Sea.

== See also ==
- Exclusive economic zone of Indonesia
- Exclusive economic zone of Malaysia
- Exclusive economic zone of the Philippines
- Exclusive economic zone of Thailand
