= Exclusive economic zone of Indonesia =

Areas of the sea in which Indonesia has special rights

The exclusive economic zone claimed by Indonesia is shown in capri

Indonesia has the sixth largest exclusive economic zone (EEZ) in the world with an area of 6,159,032 km^{2} (2,378,016 mi^{2}). Indonesia has claimed an EEZ of 200 nautical miles (370 km) from its coastline. This causes the number of islands in the Indonesian archipelago, totaling 17,508 islands, Indonesia has the 2nd largest coastline of 99,083 km (61,542,159 miles). Indonesia position is also located on the crossing route in Southeast Asia between the Indian Ocean and the Pacific Ocean.

== Geography ==
Indonesia is the largest island country in the world. The total land area is 1,904,569 square kilometres (735,358 sq mi), Including 6,159,032 square kilometres (2,378,016 sq mi) of inland seas (straits, bays, and other bodies of water). The total land and sea area (including the EEZ) of Indonesia is about 8,063 million km^{2}.

The five main islands are Sumatra, Java, Borneo, Sulawesi, and Papua. There are two major island groups (Nusa Tenggara and the Maluku Islands) and sixty smaller island groups. Borneo is shared with Malaysia and Brunei; the Sebatik Island (located northeast of Borneo) is shared with Malaysia; Timor is shared with East Timor; and Papua is shared with Papua New Guinea (east side).

== Disputes ==
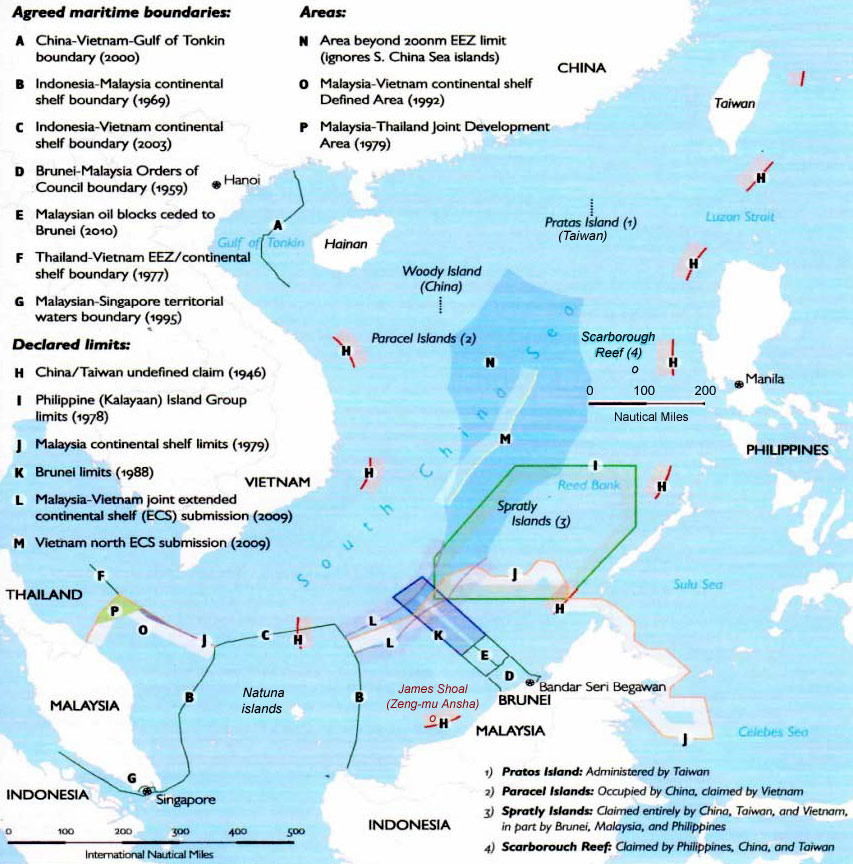
South China Sea claims and agreements.

Parts of China's nine-dash line overlap Indonesia's exclusive economic zone near the Natuna islands. Indonesia believes China's claim over parts of the Natuna islands has no legal basis. In November 2015, Indonesia's security chief Luhut Panjaitan said Indonesia could take China before an international court if Beijing's claim to the majority of the South China Sea and part of Indonesian territory is not resolved through dialogue.

The Philippines, Vietnam, Malaysia, Brunei and Indonesia have all officially protested over the use of such a line.

On 26 May 2020, Indonesia sent a formal letter to the United Nations which said "Indonesia reiterates that the Nine-Dash line map implying historic rights claim clearly lacks international legal basis and is tantamount to upsetting UNCLOS 1982," “As a State Party to UNCLOS 1982, Indonesia has consistently called for the full compliance toward international law, including UNCLOS 1982. Indonesia hereby declares that it is not bound by any claims made in contravention to international law, including UNCLOS 1982,"

== See also ==
- Exclusive economic zone of India
- Exclusive economic zone of Malaysia
- Exclusive economic zone of Thailand
- Exclusive economic zone of Vietnam
- Sabang strategic port development
- Territorial waters of Indonesia
- Sea level rise
- Subsidence
- Groundwater-related subsidence
- List of countries by average elevation
- Territorial disputes in the South China Sea
