= Malaccamax =

Largest ships that can transit the Strait of Malacca

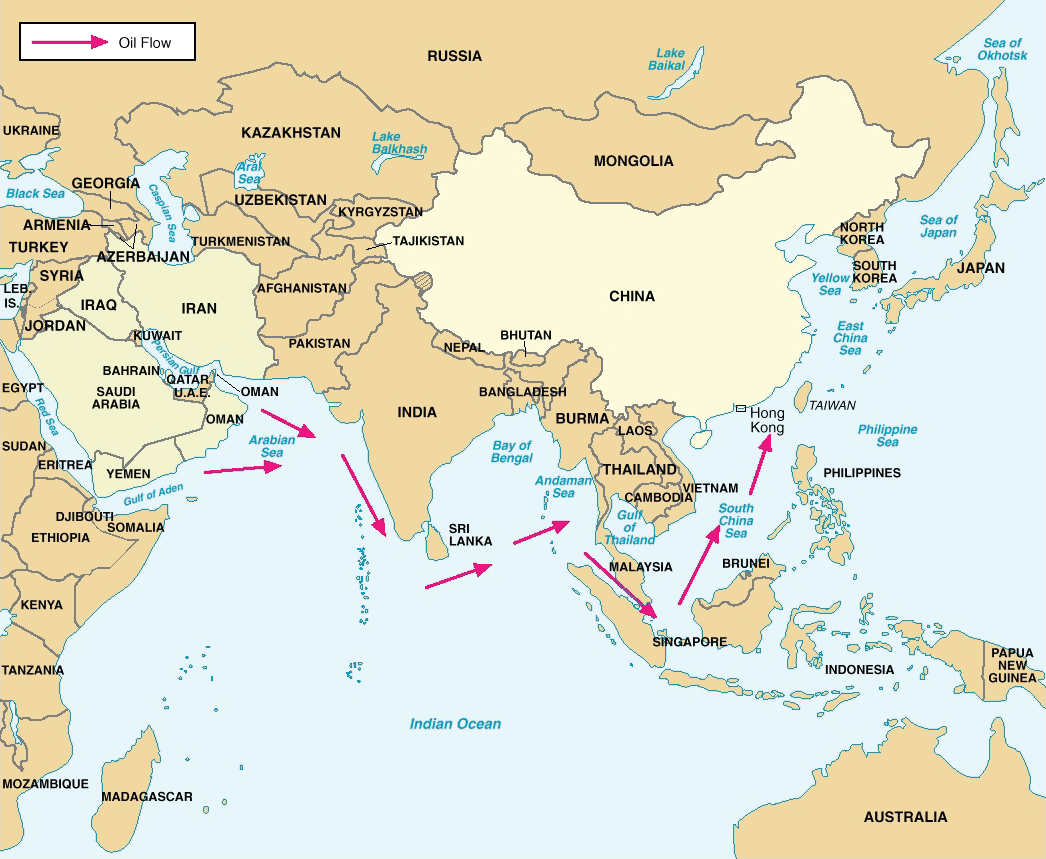
- Malaccamax is defined by the Strait of Malacca, Malaccamax tankers can carry oil from the Persian Gulf to China.

General characteristics
- Tonnage: 300,000 DWT
- Length: 333 m (1,093 ft)
- Beam: 60 m (197 ft)
- Draft: 20.5 m (67 ft)

Malaccamax is a naval architecture term for the largest tonnage of ship capable of fitting through the 25-metre-deep (82 ft) Strait of Malacca. Bulk carriers and supertankers have been built to this tonnage, and the term is chosen for very large crude carriers (VLCC). They can transport oil from Arabia to China. A typical Malaccamax tanker can have a maximum length of 333 m (1,093 ft), beam of 60 m (197 ft), draught of 20.5 m (67.3 ft), and tonnage of 300,000 DWT.

Similar terms Panamax, Suezmax and Seawaymax are used for the largest ships capable of fitting through the Panama Canal, the Suez Canal and Saint Lawrence Seaway, respectively.

== Problems ==
Comparison of Malaccamax with other ship sizes

Some Chinamax and most Capesize and very large crude carriers cannot pass this strait. Ships such as Suezmax and Neopanamax can pass. Any post-Malaccamax ship would need to use even longer alternate routes because traditional seaways such as the Sunda Strait, between the Indonesian islands of Java and Sumatra would become too shallow for large ships. Other routes would therefore be required:

- Lombok Strait (250 m (820 ft)), Dewakang Sill (680 m (2,230 ft)), Makassar Strait, then either east past Mindanao to the Philippine Sea or north through Sibutu Passage and Mindoro Strait
- Ombai Strait, Banda Sea, Lifamatola Strait (1,940 m (6,360 ft)) between the Sula Islands and Obi Islands, and Molucca Sea
- around Australia

Artificially excavated new routes might also be a possibility:

- deepening the Strait of Malacca, specifically at its minimum depth in the Singapore Strait,
- the proposed Kra Canal, which however would take much more excavation.
