= List of endangered species in Vietnam =

The following is a list of endangered species inhabiting Vietnam.

== Annam chorus frog (Microhyla annamensis) ==
The Annam chorus frog is an endangered frog of the family Microhylidae, found in Cambodia, Laos, Thailand, and Vietnam.

== Banded eagle ray (Aetomylaeus nichofii) ==
Banded eagle rays are widespread but vulnerable. They live in the open ocean, coral reefs, and shallow seas.

== Bengal slow loris (Nycticebus bengalensis) ==
The Bengal slow loris is a nocturnal and arboreal primate that lives in both evergreen and deciduous forests. It is listed as endangered on the IUCN Red List. Threats to this species include habitat loss (largely through illegal logging) and poaching (for bushmeat, Traditional Chinese medicine, and the exotic pet trade). It is commonly sold in local animal markets.

== Black-crested gibbon (Nomascus concolor) ==
The black-crested gibbon is listed as critically endangered on the IUCN Red List, with a total estimated population of 1300 to 2000 individuals remaining in the wild. Major threats to this species include habitat loss (due to deforestation for agriculture/logging) and poaching (for bushmeat and the exotic pet trade). These factors are causing fragmentation of their territories and a decline in their population. The species is found in two protected areas of Vietnam: the Mu Cang Chai Species and Habitat Conservation Area in Yên Bái province, and the Hoàng Liên-Văn Bàn Nature Reserve in Lào Cai province. The current population in Vietnam is only 64 - 70 individuals in 22 - 25 groups. These populations have been monitored since 2001 and have declined despite conservation interventions.

== Delacour's langur (Trachypithecus delacouri) ==
A type of leaf-eating langur that has an unusually long and bushy tail with white hips. It is also one of the most endangered primates in the world. Only about 300 Delacour's langurs are alive today, and experts fear they could be completely extinct if the current rate of decline continues. The monkeys are being pushed to the brink by hunting for the Chinese traditional medicine trade. Hunting has forced the animal into a few extreme strongholds, where steep limestone cliffs grant a little protection from poachers.

== Great hammerhead (Sphyrna mokarran) ==
The great hammerhead shark is a shark from the family Sphyrnidae. The great hammerhead shark lives in tropical and subtropical waters worldwide. The "hammer" is used to attack whiptail rays. The great hammerhead can be found in many public aquaria. These animals need humans to keep going with conservation and stop hunting them for shark fin soup.

== Indochinese tiger (Panthera tigris corbetti) ==
The Indochinese tiger is also known as the Corbett's tiger. This species of tiger used to be referred to as a Malayan tiger. The Indochinese tiger is the 2nd most common species of tiger. It is the species that lives in Vietnam.

== Red-shanked douc (Pygathrix nemaeus) ==
The red-shanked douc is a species of Old World monkey native to Indochina which lives in the forests of Vietnam, southern Laos and possibly northeastern Cambodia. It is threatened by residential and commercial development.

== Saola (Pseudoryx nghetinhensis) ==
The saola is one of the world's rarest large mammals, a forest-dwelling bovine native to the Annamite Range in Vietnam and Laos.

== Siamese crocodile (Crocodylus siamensis) ==
Siamese crocodiles are critically endangered. These animals prefer slow-moving water such as swamps, rivers, and some lakes. Siamese crocodiles are threatened because of loss of habitat, illegal capture of wild crocodiles for supply to commercial farms, and incidental capture/drowning in fishing nets and traps.

== Tam Dao salamander (Paramesotriton deloustali) ==
The Tam Dao salamander, or Vietnamese salamander, is an amphibian native to Vietnam. It is threatened by loss of habitat.

== Vietnamese leaf turtle (Geoemyda spengleri) ==
The Vietnamese leaf turtle is also known as the black-breasted leaf turtle or black-breasted hill turtle. This turtle is native to Vietnam and China. This animal is currently endangered.

== Vietnamese pheasant (Lophura hatinhensis) ==
The pheasant is listed endangered by the International Union for Conservation of Nature (IUCN). Vietnamese pheasants only live in central Vietnam. They are threatened because of hunting and loss of habitat.
