= List of countries by average elevation =

This is a list of countries and territories by their average elevation above sea level based on the data published by Central Intelligence Agency, unless another source is cited. The list includes sovereign states and self-governing dependent territories based upon the ISO standard ISO 3166-1.

== List ==
Countries and territories shaded by average elevation

Location	Elevation		Ref
Location	m	ft	Ref
World	840	2,756	
Afghanistan	1,884	6,181	
Albania	708	2,323	
Algeria	800	2,625	
Andorra	1,996	6,549	
Angola	1,112	3,648	
Antarctica	2,300	7,546	
Argentina	595	1,952	
Armenia	1,792	5,879	
Australia	330	1,083	
Austria	910	2,986	
Azerbaijan	384	1,260	
Bangladesh	85	279	
Belarus	160	525	
Belgium	181	594	
Belize	173	568	
Benin	273	896	
Bhutan	3,280	10,761	
Bolivia	1,192	3,911	
Bosnia and Herzegovina	500	1,640	
Botswana	1,013	3,323	
Brazil	320	1,050	
Brunei	478	1,568	
Bulgaria	472	1,549	(Note: 470 m (1,542 ft) according to other sources)
Burkina Faso	297	974	
Burundi	1,504	4,934	
Cambodia	126	413	
Cameroon	667	2,188	
Canada	487	1,598	
Central African Republic	635	2,083	
Chad	543	1,781	
Chile	1,871	6,138	
China	1,840	6,037	
Colombia	593	1,946	
Costa Rica	746	2,448	
Croatia	331	1,086	
Cuba	108	354	
Cyprus	91	299	
Czech Republic	430	1,411	
Democratic Republic of the Congo	726	2,382	
Denmark	34	112	
Djibouti	430	1,411	
Dominican Republic	424	1,391	
Ecuador	1,117	3,665	
Egypt	321	1,053	
El Salvador	442	1,450	
Equatorial Guinea	577	1,893	
Eritrea	853	2,799	
Estonia	61	200	
Eswatini	305	1,001	
Ethiopia	1,330	4,364	
Finland	164	538	
France	375	1,230	
French Guiana	168	551	
Gabon	377	1,237	
Gambia	34	112	
Georgia	1,432	4,698	
Germany	263	863	
Ghana	190	623	
Greece	498	1,634	
Greenland	1,792	5,879	
Guatemala	759	2,490	
Guinea	472	1,549	
Guinea-Bissau	70	230	
Guyana	207	679	
Haiti	470	1,542	
Honduras	684	2,244	
Hungary	143	469	
Iceland	557	1,827	
India	621	2,037	
Indonesia	367	1,204	
Iran	1,305	4,281	
Iraq	312	1,024	
Ireland	118	387	
Israel	508	1,667	
Italy	538	1,765	
Ivory Coast	250	820	
Jamaica	340	1,115	
Japan	438	1,437	
Jordan	812	2,664	(Note: 920 m (3,018 ft) according to other sources)
Kazakhstan	387	1,270	
Kenya	762	2,500	
Kiribati	2	7	
Kosovo	810	2,657	
Kuwait	108	354	
Kyrgyzstan	2,988	9,803	
Laos	710	2,329	
Latvia	87	285	
Lebanon	1,250	4,101	
Lesotho	2,161	7,090	
Liberia	243	797	
Libya	423	1,388	
Liechtenstein	1,080	3,543	
Lithuania	110	361	
Luxembourg	325	1,066	
Madagascar	615	2,018	(Note: 442 m (1,450 ft) according to other sources)
Malawi	779	2,556	
Malaysia	419	1,375	(Note: 538 m (1,765 ft) according to other sources)
Maldives	1.5	5	
Mali	343	1,125	
Marshall Islands	2	7	
Mauritania	276	906	
Mexico	1,111	3,645	
Moldova	139	456	
Mongolia	1,580	5,184	
Montenegro	1,086	3,563	
Morocco	909	2,982	
Mozambique	345	1,132	
Myanmar	702	2,303	
Namibia	1,141	3,743	
Nepal	3,265	10,712	
Netherlands	30	98	
New Zealand	388	1,273	
Nicaragua	298	978	
Niger	474	1,555	
Nigeria	380	1,247	
North Korea	440	1,444	
North Macedonia	741	2,431	
Norway	460	1,509	
Oman	310	1,017	
Pakistan	900	2,953	
Panama	360	1,181	
Papua New Guinea	667	2,188	
Paraguay	178	584	
Peru	1,555	5,102	
Philippines	442	1,450	
Poland	173	568	
Portugal	372	1,220	
Qatar	28	92	
Republic of the Congo	430	1,411	
Romania	414	1,358	
Russia	600	1,969	
Rwanda	1,598	5,243	
Saudi Arabia	665	2,182	
Senegal	69	226	
Serbia	442	1,450	(Note: 473 m (1,552 ft) according to other sources)
Sierra Leone	279	915	
Singapore	15	49	
Slovakia	458	1,503	
Slovenia	492	1,614	
Somalia	410	1,345	
South Africa	1,034	3,392	
South Korea	282	925	
Spain	660	2,165	
Sri Lanka	228	748	
Sudan	568	1,864	
Suriname	246	807	
Sweden	320	1,050	
Switzerland	1,350	4,429	
Syria	514	1,686	
Taiwan	1,150	3,773	
Tajikistan	3,186	10,453	
Tanzania	1,018	3,340	
Thailand	287	942	
Togo	236	774	
Trinidad and Tobago	83	272	
Tunisia	246	807	
Turkey	1,141	3,743	
Turkmenistan	230	755	
Tuvalu	1.8	6	
Uganda	1,100	3,609	
Ukraine	175	574	
United Arab Emirates	149	489	
United Kingdom	162	531	
United States	760	2,493	
Uruguay	109	358	
Uzbekistan	450	1,476	
Venezuela	450	1,476	
Vietnam	398	1,306	
Western Sahara	256	840	
Yemen	999	3,278	
Zambia	1,138	3,734	
Zimbabwe	961	3,153	

== See also ==
- List of elevation extremes by country
  - List of highest points of African countries
  - List of highest points of Asian countries
  - List of highest points of European countries
- List of islands by highest point
- List of highest towns by country
- List of highest mountains on Earth
