= Exclusive economic zone of Malaysia =

Malaysia claims an exclusive economic zone (EEZ) of 334,671 km^{2} (129,217 sq mi) with 200 nautical miles (370.4 km; 230.2 mi) from its shores. The EEZ includes much of the southern area of the South China Sea. Malaysia has the 29th longest coastline of 4,675 km (2,905 mi). The coastline comprises two distinct parts of Malaysia. The Peninsular Malaysia's coastline to the west is 2,068 km (1,285 mi) and East Malaysia's coastline is 2,607 km (1,620 mi). They are separated by the South China Sea. The total land area, including inland bodies of water, of Malaysia is 330,803 km^{2} (127,724 sq mi). Peninsular Malaysia borders Thailand in the north, while East Malaysia borders Brunei and Indonesia on the island of Borneo.

== Disputes ==
Territorial claims in the South China Sea. Malaysia's EEZ has a yellow line.

=== Territory ===
Malaysia has territorial disputes in the South China Sea mainly with the People's Republic of China. Malaysia rejects China's nine-dash line claim which covers most of the South China Sea and extends much further than 200 nautical miles (370.4 km; 230.2 mi) from China's shoreline. The nine-dash line runs through Malaysia's Exclusive Economic Zone in the South China Sea and would reduce Malaysia's EEZ by 2/5th.

In the latter half of the 1970s, Malaysia and the Philippines began referring to the Spratly Islands as included in their own territory. On 11 June 1978, President Ferdinand Marcos of the Philippines issued the Presidential decree No. 1596, declaring the north-western part of the Spratly Islands (referred to therein as the Kalayaan Island Group) as Philippine territory. Since the 1990s, Malaysia occupies 5 of the Spratly Islands. China's construction of artificial islands and military bases has shifted the balance of power mostly towards China in the South China Sea. Other than the South China Sea, Malaysia has maritime disputes with Indonesia in the Ambalat Block located at the north-western extremity of the Celebes Sea where Indonesia claims an EEZ all the way to Malaysian territorial waters off the coast of Pulau Sipadan that almost triggered a naval standoff in May 2009

=== Illegal fishing ===
There are recorded illegal fishing activities by Filipino and Vietnamese fishing boats in Malaysia's EEZ. Such as in 2016 they were caught and detained by the Royal Malaysian Navy. This is due to an increase in demand for seafood. There is a shrinking stock of marine life due to pollution and excessive fishing. Vietnamese fishermen travel further away from Vietnam due to severe water pollution by a Taiwanese steel plant in Vietnam which damaged marine life. On 16 August 2020, a Malaysia Maritime Enforcement Agency (MMEA) vessel had reportedly shot dead a Vietnamese fisherman and also captured the fishing vessel on which the fishermen used to conduct illegal fishing within Malaysia's rightful EEZ. Officials from the MMEA also confirmed that the Vietnamese fishermen attempted to aggressively ram the MMEA vessel besides throwing diesel bombs on the MMEA vessel to set it on fire.

On 5 April 2016, Indonesian authorities destroyed 23 illegal Vietnamese and Malaysian fishing boats that were trespassing Indonesia's EEZ.

=== Piracy ===
There are Indonesian pirates who frequently attack Malaysian, Singaporean and Vietnamese vessels. Among the notable incidents are the hijacking of the MT Orkim Harmony and MT Zafirah. Filipino pirates operate in the Sulu Sea and they can reach the South China Sea. This is near the Malaysian state of Sabah located on the northern portion of Borneo.

== See also ==
- Territorial disputes in the South China Sea
- Exclusive economic zone of India
- Exclusive economic zone of Indonesia
- Exclusive economic zone of Thailand
- Pedra Branca dispute (Batu Puteh)
- Sabang strategic port development
