= Exclusive economic zone of Thailand =

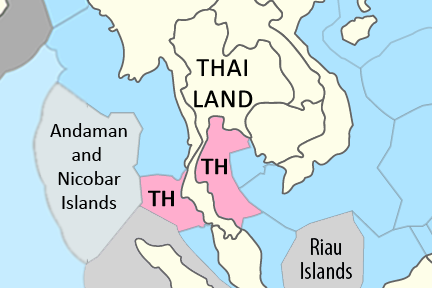
The exclusive economic zone of Thailand shown in pink

Thailand has the world's 64th largest exclusive economic zone (EEZ), with an area of 305,778 km^{2} (118,062 mi^{2}). It claims an EEZ of 200 nmi (370.4 km; 230.2 mi) from its shores, which has long coastlines with the Andaman Sea and Strait of Malacca to the west and the Gulf of Thailand to the east, although all of its EEZ is limited by maritime boundaries with neighbouring countries.

Thailand's western sea territory stretches from the west coast of southern Thailand in the Andaman Sea and the Strait of Malacca. It shares treaty-defined maritime boundaries with Myanmar, the Andaman and Nicobar Islands of India, Indonesia and Malaysia.

== Geography ==
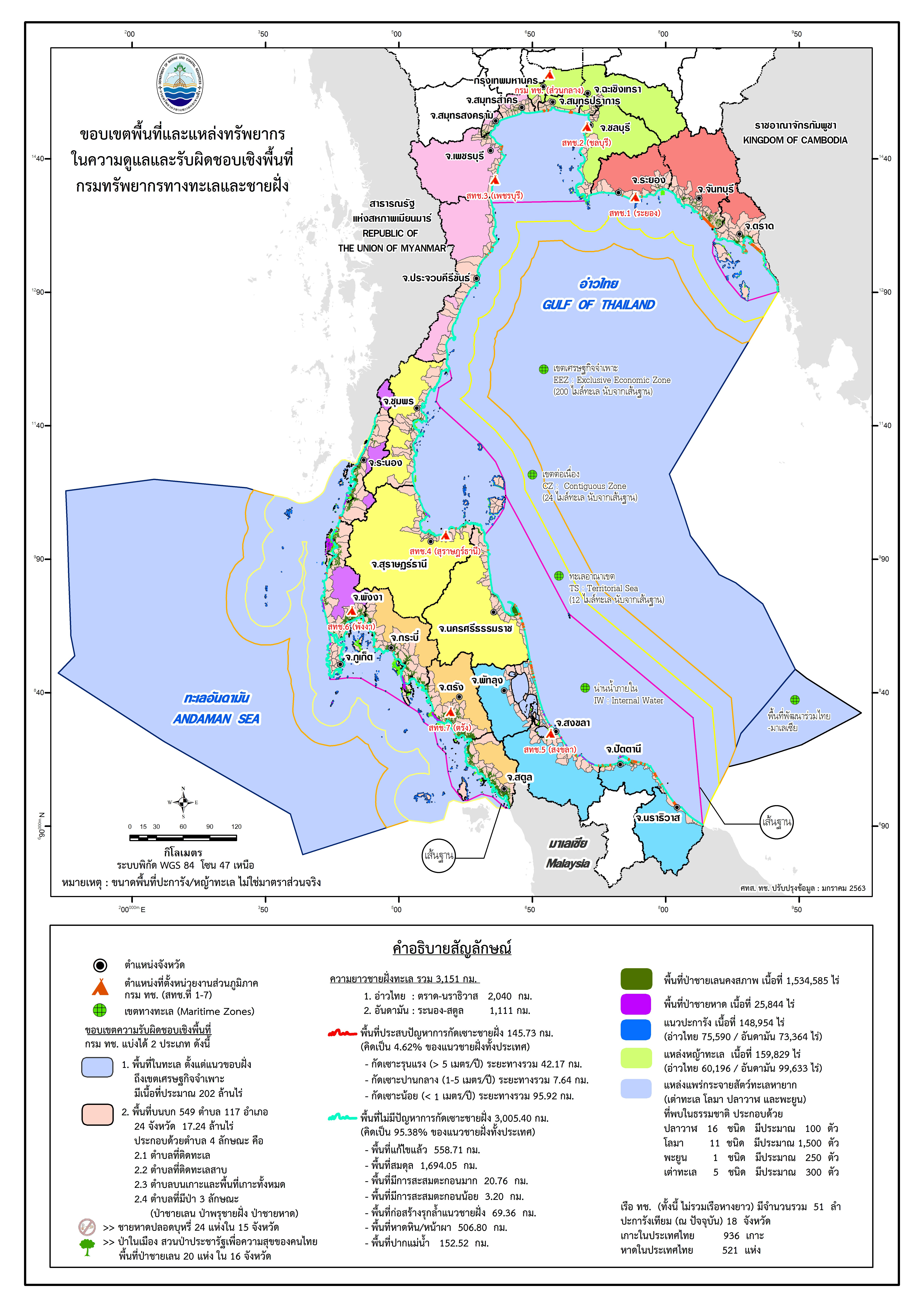
EEZ of Thailand and resources map 2020

Area
| Sea zone | Gulf of Thailand | Andaman Coast & Northern Strait of Malacca | Notes |
|---|---|---|---|
| Internal waters | 54,103,470 km^{2} (20,889,470 sq mi) | 7,850,570 km^{2} (3,031,120 sq mi) | |
| Territorial sea | 29,344,360 km^{2} (11,329,920 sq mi) | 23,723,860 km^{2} (9,159,830 sq mi) | |
| Contiguous zone | 23,909,180 km^{2} (9,231,390 sq mi) | 13,604,040 km^{2} (5,252,550 sq mi) | |
| EEZ | 88,193,970 km^{2} (34,051,880 sq mi) | 75,633,650 km^{2} (29,202,320 sq mi) | |
| Malaysia–Thailand joint development area | 7,125.22 km^{2} (2,751.06 sq mi) | | Located in a specific economic zone. |
| Combined | 202,676.20 km^{2} (78,253.72 sq mi) | 120,812.120 km^{2} (46,645.820 sq mi) | |
| Total (includes the maritime area of Thailand) | | 323,488.32 km^{2} (124,899.54 sq mi) | |

== Disputes and resolved ==
Thailand has not established agreements with Cambodia and Vietnam, who also have maritime territory in the Gulf of Thailand, leading to conflicts. It also has not established a treaty with Malaysia on their gulf waters; however, the Malaysia–Thailand joint development area was established for both countries to jointly exploit the resources in the area of their overlapping claims.

=== Cambodia ===
==== Ko Kut (Koh Kood) ====
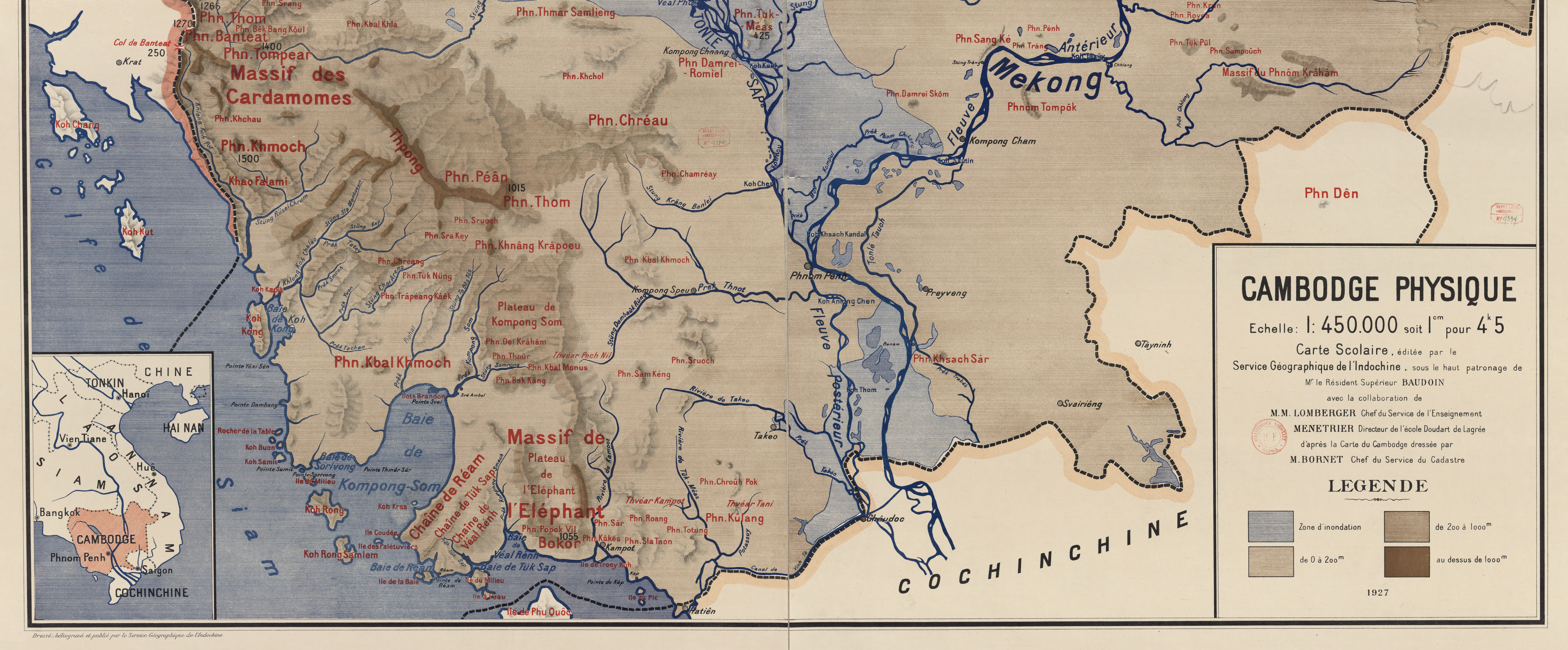
Cambodge Physique map 1927 by Baudoin, Thai maritime border

Cambodia claimed the island Ko Kut (Koh Kood). However, the French colonial administrator François Marius Baudoin (1867–1957) made an official map titled Cambodge Physique in 1927. This map features the maritime border between Cambodia and Siam (Thailand). Ko Kut is within the Siamese maritime territory. The black demarcation line is 240 degrees to the south of the town Khlong Yai in Trat Province, Thailand, and the town Phumi Cham Yeam in Cambodia.

== See also ==
- Geography of Thailand
- Outline of Thailand
