= Extreme points of Indonesia =

List of extreme points in Indonesia

This is an article about the extreme points of Indonesia.

In the context of its geography, the northern extreme is 6°4'30" North and southern is 11°0'27" South. The western extreme point is at 94°58'22" East and the furthest east is at 141°1'10" East.

Each major island has its individual extreme points as well.

== Indonesia ==
- Geographic center – Makassar Strait, near Balabalagan Islands 2°27′58.5″S 117°59′46″E
- Northernmost point – Rondo Island, Sukakarya District, Sabang City, Aceh 6°4′30″N 95°6′45″E
- Southernmost point – Pamana Island, Southwest Rote District, Rote Ndao Regency, East Nusa Tenggara 11°0′27″S 122°52′29″E
- Westernmost point – Benggala Island, Pulo Aceh District, Aceh Besar Regency, Aceh 5°47′32″N 94°58′22″E
- Easternmost point – Torasi Estuary, Indonesia-Papua New Guinea border, Merauke Regency, South Papua 9°7′42″S 141°1′10″E
- Northernmost settlement – Ie Meulee, Sukajaya District, Sabang City, Aceh 5°53′59″N 95°19′33″E
- Southernmost settlement – Bo'a, West Rote District, Rote Ndao Regency, East Nusa Tenggara 10°56′2″S 122°50′39″E
- Westernmost settlement – Melingge, Pulo Aceh District, Aceh Besar Regency, Aceh 5°44′15″N 95°2′30″E
- Easternmost settlement – Sota, Sota District, Merauke Regency, South Papua 8°25′42″S 141°1′8″E
- Lowest point – Southern Philippine Trench, Philippine Sea −9,125 metres (−29,938 ft) 5°30′7″N 127°40′48″E
- Highest point – Puncak Jaya, Sudirman Range, Mimika Regency, Central Papua 4,884 metres (16,024 ft) 4°4′42″S 137°9′26″E

== Sumatra ==
- Highest Point – Mount Kerinci, Barisan Mountains, West Sumatra-Jambi border 3,805 metres (12,484 ft) 1°41′45″S 101°16′2″E
- Lowest Point – Sunda Trench, Indian Ocean −7,725 metres (−25,344 ft)

=== Including Islands ===
- Northernmost Point – Rondo Island, Sukakarya District, Sabang City, Aceh 6°4′30″N 95°6′45″E, north of this lies India's southernmost point Indira Point in Nicobar Islands
- Southernmost Point – Rakata, Krakatau Islands, South Lampung Regency, Lampung 6°10′4″S 105°26′57″E
- Westernmost Point – Benggala Island, Pulo Air District, Aceh Besar Regency, Aceh 5°47′34″N 94°58′21″E
- Easternmost Point – Kepala Island, Natuna Islands, Natuna Regency, Riau Islands 2°38′43″N 109°10′4″E

=== Sumatra only ===
- Northernmost Point – Point Batee, Mesjid Raya District, Aceh Besar Regency, Aceh 5°39′23″N 95°25′56″E
- Southernmost Point – Cape Belimbing, Bukit Barisan Selatan National Park, Pesisir Barat Regency, Lampung 5°56′35″S 104°35′4″E
- Westernmost Point – Point Raja, Lhoknga SubDistrict, Aceh Besar Regency, Aceh 5°31′39″N 95°11′37″E
- Easternmost Point – Cape Kait, Tulung Selapan District, Ogan Komering Ilir Regency, South Sumatra 3°13′34″S 106°5′48″E

== Java ==
- Highest Point – Mount Semeru, Bromo Tengger Semeru National Park, Lumajang-Malang Regency border, East Java 3,676 metres (12,060 ft) 8°6′27″S 112°55′33″E
- Lowest Point – Sunda Trench, Indian Ocean −7,725 metres (−25,344 ft)

=== Including Islands ===
- Northernmost Point – Sebira Island, North Thousand Islands, Thousand Islands Regency, Jakarta 5°12′6″S 106°27′47″E
- Southernmost Point – Cape Bantenan, Blambangan Peninsula, Banyuwangi Regency, East Java 8°46′49″S 114°31′59″E
- Westernmost Point – Cape Baturendeng, Panaitan Island, Pandeglang Regency, Banten 6°36′52″S 105°6′0″E
- Easternmost Point – Sakala Island, Kangean Islands, Sumenep Regency, East Java 6°56′38″S 116°15′26″E

=== Java only ===
- Northernmost Point – Cape Pujut, Pulo Ampel District, Serang Regency, Banten 5°52′33″S 106°02′28″E
- Southernmost Point – Cape Bantenan, Blambangan Peninsula, Banyuwangi Regency, East Java 8°46′49″S 114°31′59″E
- Westernmost Point – Cape Gede, Ujung Kulon National Park, Pandeglang Regency, Banten 8°43′2″S 114°36′19″E
- Easternmost Point – Cape Slaka, Blambangan Peninsula, Banyuwangi Regency, East Java 8°43′2″S 114°36′19″E

== Kalimantan ==
- Highest Point – Bukit Raya, Schwaner Mountains, Katingan Regency, Central Kalimantan 2,278 metres (7,474 ft) 0°39′33″S 112°41′19″E
- Lowest Point – Minahasa Basin, Celebes Sea −5,250 metres (−17,220 ft)

=== Including Islands ===
- Northernmost Point – Tambalang Hulu Village, Lumbis Ogong District, Nunukan Regency, North Kalimantan-Sabah border 4°24′28″N 116°34′5″E
- Southernmost Point – Kalambau Island, Lesser Laut Islands, Tanah Laut Regency, South Kalimantan 4°56′17″S 115°38′12″E
- Westernmost Point – Dato Island, Segedong District, Mempawah Regency, West Kalimantan 0°7′35″N 108°35′40″E
- Easternmost Point – Sambit Island, Derawan Islands, Berau Regency, East Kalimantan 1°46′49″N 119°2′12″E

=== Kalimantan only ===
- Northernmost Point – Tambalang Hulu Village, Lumbis Ogong District, Nunukan Regency, North Kalimantan-Sabah border 4°24′28″N 116°34′5″E
- Southernmost Point – Cape South, Panyipatan District, Tanah Laut Regency, South Kalimantan 4°10′41″S 114°39′43″E
- Westernmost Point – Cape Gundul, Sungai Raya Islands District, Bengkayang Regency, West Kalimantan 0°48′56″N 108°50′26″E
- Easternmost Point – Cape Mangkalihat, Sandaran District, East Kutai Regency, East Kalimantan 1°1′20″N 118°59′19″E

== Lesser Sunda Islands ==
- Highest Point – Mount Rinjani, Gunung Rinjani National Park, East Lombok Regency, West Nusa Tenggara 3,726 metres (12,224 ft) 8°24′51″S 116°27′35″E
- Lowest Point – Sunda Trench, Eastern Indian Ocean −7,725 metres (−25,344 ft)
- Northernmost Point – Komba Island, Flores Sea, Lembata Regency, East Nusa Tenggara 7°47′31″S 123°34′44″E
- Southernmost Point – Pamana Island, Southwest Rote District, Rote Ndao Regency, East Nusa Tenggara 11°0′27″S 122°52′29″E
- Westernmost Point – Cape Gilimanuk, Melaya District, Jembrana Regency, Bali 8°10′19″S 114°25′53″E
- Easternmost Point – Henes Village, South Lamaknen District, Belu Regency, East Nusa Tenggara-Bobonaro District border 9°9′23″S 125°11′33″E

== Sulawesi ==
- Highest Point – Mount Latimojong, Baraka District, Enrekang Regency, South Sulawesi 3,478 metres (11,411 ft) 3°22′54″S 120°1′43″E
- Lowest Point – Southern Philippine Trench, Philippine Sea −9,125 metres (−29,938 ft)

=== Including Islands ===
- Northernmost Point – Miangas Island, Miangas District, Talaud Islands Regency, North Sulawesi 5°34′2″N 126°34′54″E
- Southernmost Point – Satuko Reef, Central Islands, Pangkajene Islands Regency, South Sulawesi 7°35′25″S 117°15′19″E
- Westernmost Point – Gusung Tandu Reef, Balabalagan Islands, Mamuju Regency, West Sulawesi 2°22′43″S 116°53′41″E
- Easternmost Point – Kakorotan Island, Nanusa District, Talaud Islands Regency, North Sulawesi 4°37′38″N 127°9′48″E

=== Sulawesi only ===
- Northernmost Point – Cape Tarabitan, West Likupang District, North Minahasa Regency, North Sulawesi 1°45′6″N 124°59′31″E
- Southernmost Point – Tanrusampe Coast, Binamu District, Jeneponto Regency, South Sulawesi 5°42′11″S 119°42′27″E
- Westernmost Point – Point Lumpatang, West Tapalang District, Mamuju Regency, West Sulawesi 2°47′06″S 118°45′26″E
- Easternmost Point – Cape Batuangus, Tangkoko Batuangus Nature Reserve, Bitung City, North Sulawesi 1°30′32″N 125°14′49″E

== Maluku Islands ==
- Highest Point – Mount Binaiya, Manusela National Park, Central Maluku Regency, Maluku 3,027 metres (9,931 ft) 3°10′24″S 129°27′19″E
- Lowest Point – Weber Deep, Banda Sea −7,350 metres (−24,110 ft)
- Northernmost Point – Cape Sopi, Morotai, Morotai Island Regency, North Maluku 2°38′43″N 128°34′2″E
- Southernmost Point – Meatimiarang Island, Sermata Islands, Southwest Maluku Regency, Maluku 8°21′9″S 128°30′52″E
- Westernmost Point – Limbo Island, Northwest Taliabu District, Taliabu Island Regency, North Maluku 1°47′48″S 124°18′37″E
- Easternmost Point – Penambulai Island, South Central Aru District, Aru Islands Regency, Maluku 6°19′26″S 134°54′53″E

== Papua (Western New Guinea) ==
- Highest Point – Puncak Jaya, Sudirman Range, Mimika Regency, Central Papua 4,884 metres (16,024 ft) 4°4′42″S 137°9′26″E
- Lowest Point – Ayu Trough, Western Pacific Ocean −5,600 metres (−18,400 ft)

=== Including Islands ===
- Northernmost Point – Fani Island, Raja Ampat Regency, West Papua 1°4′50″N 131°16′7″E
- Southernmost Point – Kondo Coast, Naukenjerai District, Merauke Regency, South Papua 9°7′55″S 141°0′47″E
- Westernmost Point – Greater Boo Island, Kofiau District, Raja Ampat Regency, West Papua 1°10′31″S 129°18′0″E
- Easternmost Point – Torasi Estuary, Indonesia-Papua New Guinea border, Merauke Regency, South Papua 9°7′42″S 141°1′10″E

=== Papua only ===
- Northernmost Point – Cape Yamursba, Abun District, Tambrauw Regency, West Papua 0°20′37″S 132°25′16″E
- Southernmost Point – Kondo Coast, Naukenjerai District, Merauke Regency, South Papua 9°7′55″S 141°0′47″E
- Westernmost Point – Cape Sele, Seget District, Sorong Regency, West Papua 1°25′39″S 130°55′53″E
- Easternmost Point – Torasi Estuary, Indonesia-Papua New Guinea border, Merauke Regency, South Papua 9°7′42″S 141°1′10″E

== See also ==
- Extreme points of Earth
