= Andaman Sea =

Marginal sea of the northeastern Indian Ocean

- Burma Sea
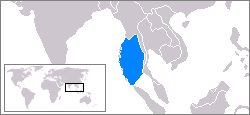
- Location of Andaman Sea in the Indian Ocean

- Location within Indian Ocean
- Coordinates: 10°N 96°E
- Type: Sea
- Basin countries: India; Indonesia; Malaysia; Myanmar; Thailand
- Max. length: 1,202 km (747 mi)
- Max. width: 647 km (402 mi)
- Surface area: 797,000 km^{2} (307,700 sq mi)
- Average depth: 1,096 m (3,596 ft)
- Max. depth: 4,198 m (13,773 ft)
- Water volume: 660,000 km^{3} (158,000 cu mi)

Andaman Sea

Burmese name
- Burmese: ကပ္ပလီပင်လယ်
- IPA: Kappali Pinlae

Thai name
- Thai: ทะเลอันดามัน
- RTGS: Thale Andaman

Malay name
- Malay: Laut Andaman

Indonesian name
- Indonesian: Laut Andaman

Bengali name
- Bengali: আন্দামান সাগর

Tamil name
- Tamil: அந்தமான் கடல்

Hindi name
- Hindi: अंडमान सागर

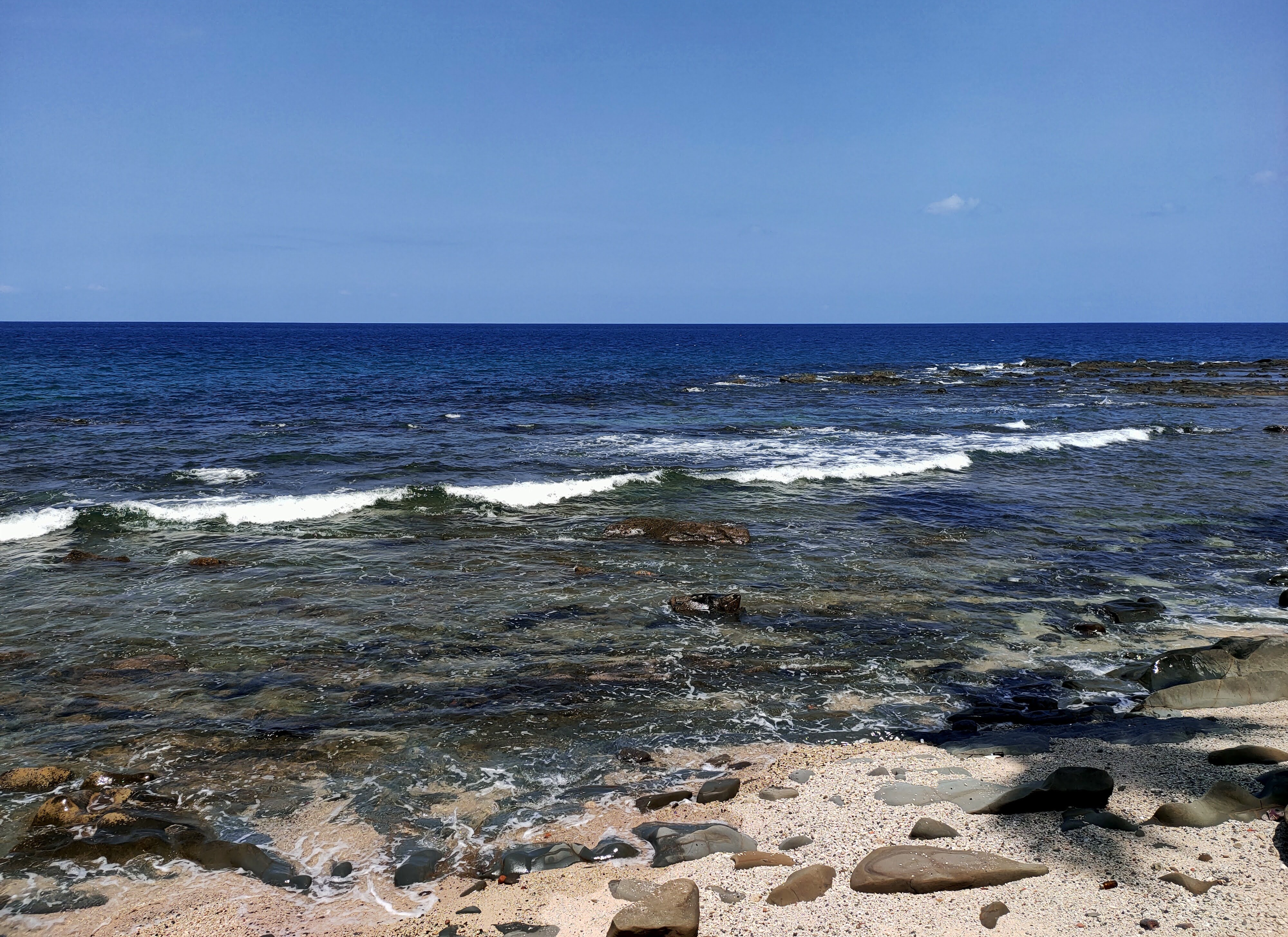
Andaman sea as seen from Ross Island near Port Blair

The Andaman Sea (historically also known as the Burma Sea) is a marginal sea of the northeastern Indian Ocean bounded by the coastlines of Myanmar and Thailand along the Gulf of Martaban and the west side of the Malay Peninsula, and separated from the Bay of Bengal to its west by the Andaman Islands and the Nicobar Islands. Its southern end is at Breueh Island just north of Sumatra, with the Strait of Malacca further southeast.

Traditionally, the sea has been used for fishery and transportation of goods between the coastal countries and its coral reefs and islands, which are popular tourist destinations. The fishery and tourist infrastructure was severely damaged by the December 2004 Indian Ocean earthquake and tsunami.

== Geography ==
=== Location ===
The Andaman Sea, which extends over 92°E to 100°E and 4°N to 20°N, occupies a very significant position in the Indian Ocean, yet remained unexplored for a long period. To the south of Myanmar, west of Thailand, and north of Indonesia, this sea is separated from the Bay of Bengal by the Andaman and Nicobar Islands and an associated chain of sea mounts along the Indo-Burmese plate boundary. The Strait of Malacca (between the Malay Peninsula and Sumatra) forms the southern exitway of the basin, which is 3 kilometres (1.9 mi) wide and 37 metres (121 ft) deep.

=== Extent ===
The International Hydrographic Organization defines the limits of the "Andaman or Burma Sea" as follows:

On the Southwest. A line running from "Oedjong Raja" ["Ujung Raja" or "Point Raja"] (5°32′N 95°12′E) in Sumatra to Poeloe Bras (Breuëh) and on through the Western Islands of the Nicobar Group to Sandy Point in Little Andaman Island, in such a way that all the narrow waters appertain to the Burma Sea.

On the Northwest. The Eastern limit of the Bay of Bengal [A line running from Cape Negrais (16°03'N) in Burma [Myanmar] through the larger islands of the Andaman group, in such a way that all the narrow waters between the islands lie to the Eastward of the line and are excluded from the Bay of Bengal, as far as a point in Little Andaman Island in latitude 10°48'N, longitude 92°24'E].

On the Southeast. A line joining Lem Voalan (7°47'N) in Siam [Thailand], and Pedropunt (5°40'N) in Sumatra.

Oedjong means "cape" and Lem means "point in the Dutch language on maps of the Netherlands East Indies (Indonesia). Lem Voalan [Phromthep Cape] is the southern extremity of Goh Puket (Phuket Island).

=== Exclusive economic zone ===
Exclusive economic zones in Andaman Sea:

Number	Country	Area (Km^{2})
1	India - Andaman and Nicobar Islands	659,590
2	Myanmar - Mainland	511,389
3	Thailand - Andaman Sea	118,714
4	Indonesia - Northeast Aceh	76,500
Total	Andaman Sea	-

=== Channels ===
See Channels in Bay of Bengal, Laccadive Sea, and Arabian Sea.

== Geology ==
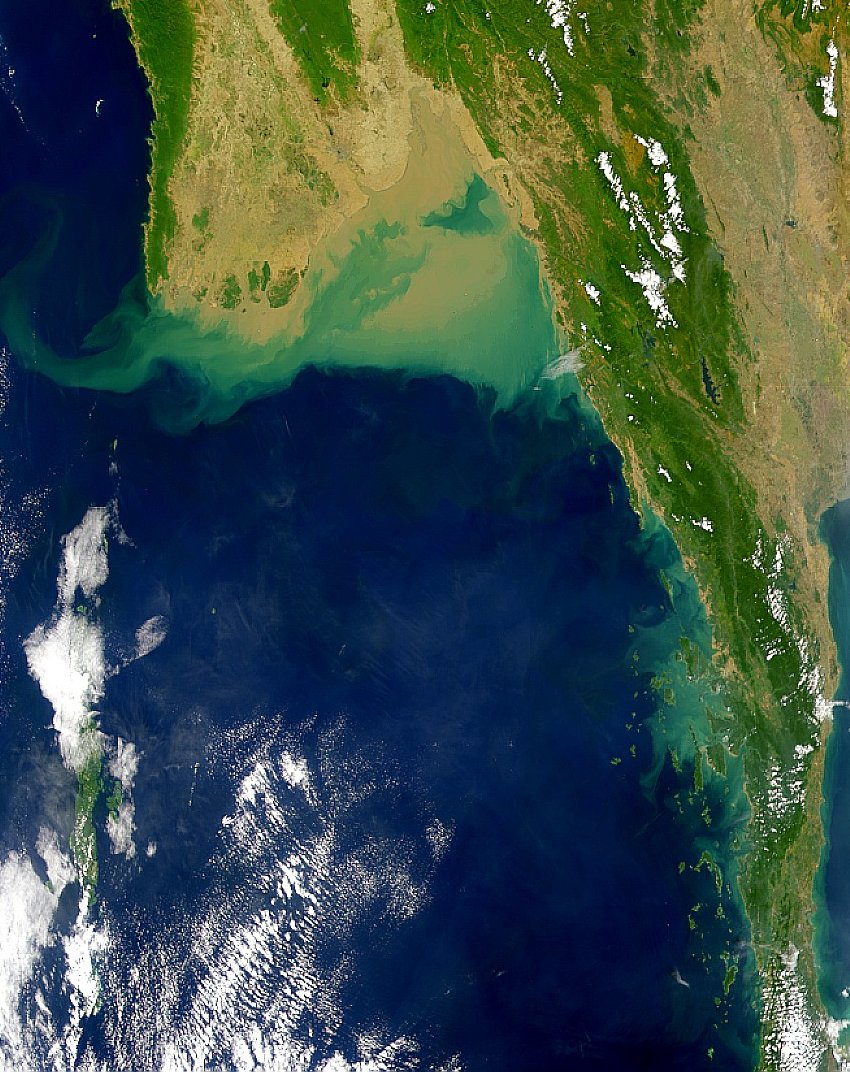
Satellite image of the Andaman Sea showing the green algae and silt deposits due to the Irrawaddy River in its northern part

The northern and eastern side of the basin is considered shallow, as the continental shelf off the coast of Myanmar and Thailand extends over 200 kilometres (120 mi) (marked by 300 metres (980 ft) isobath). About 45 percent of the basin area is shallower (less than 500 metres (1,600 ft) depth), which is the direct consequence of the presence of the wider shelf. The continental slope which follows the eastern shelf is quite steep between 9°N and 14°N. Here, the perspective view of the submarine topography sectioned along 95°E exposes the abrupt rise in depth of sea by about 3,000 metres (9,800 ft) within a short horizontal distance of a degree. Isobaths corresponding to 900 and 2,000 metres (3,000 and 6,600 ft) are also shown in the figure to emphasize the steepness of the slope. Further, it may be noted that the deep ocean is also not free from sea mounts; hence only around 15 percent of the total area is deeper than 2,500 metres (8,200 ft).

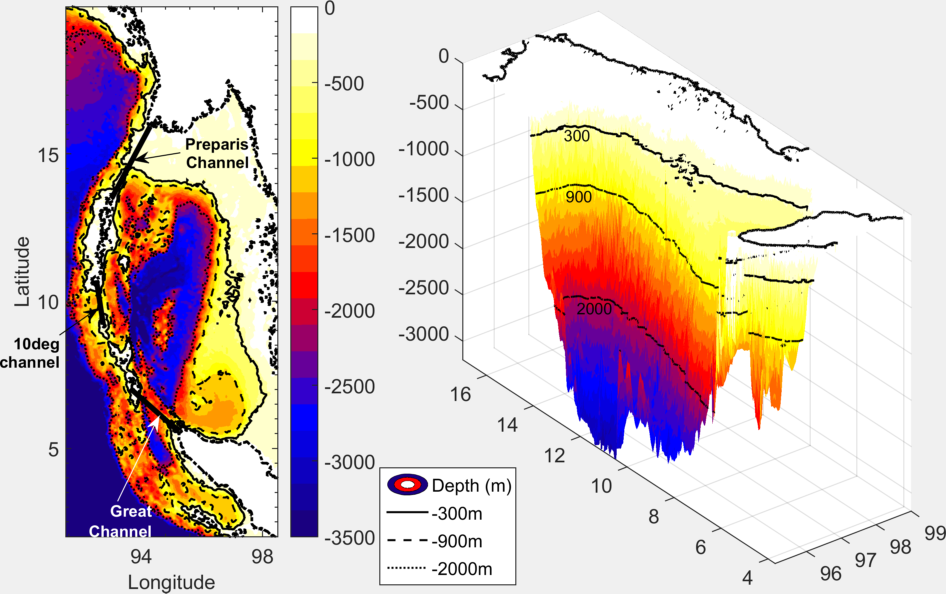
The bathymetry (in metres) of the Andaman Sea in 2D and 3D (sectioned along 95°E)

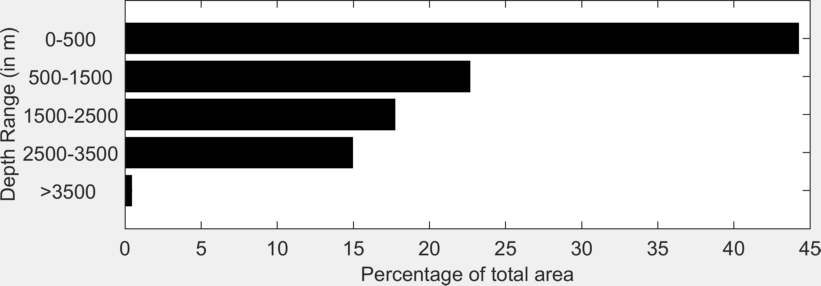
Percentage of the total area of Andaman Sea corresponding to different depth ranges

The northern and eastern parts are shallower than 180 meters (590 feet) due to the silt deposited by the Irrawaddy River. This major river flows into the sea from the north through Myanmar. The western and central areas are 900–3,000 meters (3,000–9,800 ft) deep. Less than 5% of the sea is deeper than 3,000 meters (9,800 feet), and in a system of submarine valleys east of the Andaman-Nicobar Ridge, the depth exceeds 4,000 meters (13,000 feet). The sea floor is covered with pebbles, gravel, and sand.

The western boundary of the Andaman Sea is marked by islands and sea mounts, with straits or passages of variable depths that control the entry and exit of water to the Bay of Bengal. There is a drastic change in water depth over a short distance of 200 kilometres (120 mi), as one moves from the Bay of Bengal (around 3,500 metres (11,500 ft) deep) to the vicinity of islands (up to 1,000 metres (3,300 ft) depth) and further into the Andaman Sea. Water is exchanged between the Andaman Sea and the Bay of Bengal through the straits between the Andaman and Nicobar Islands. Out of these, the most important straits (in terms of width and depth) are Preparis Channel (PC), Ten Degree Channel (TDC), and Great Channel (GC). PC is the widest but shallowest (250 metres (820 ft)) of the three and separates south Myanmar from north Andaman. TDC is 600 metres (2,000 ft) deep and lies between Little Andaman and Car Nicobar. GC is 1,500 metres (4,900 ft) deep and separates Great Nicobar from Banda Aceh.

=== Ocean floor tectonics ===
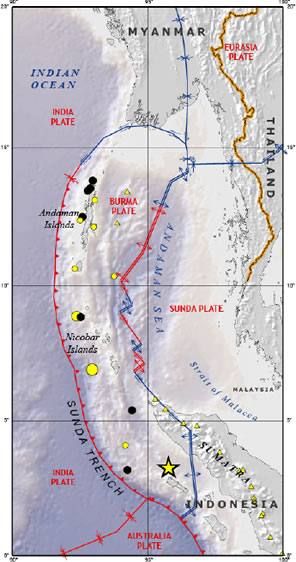
The Andaman Sea, showing tectonic plate boundaries

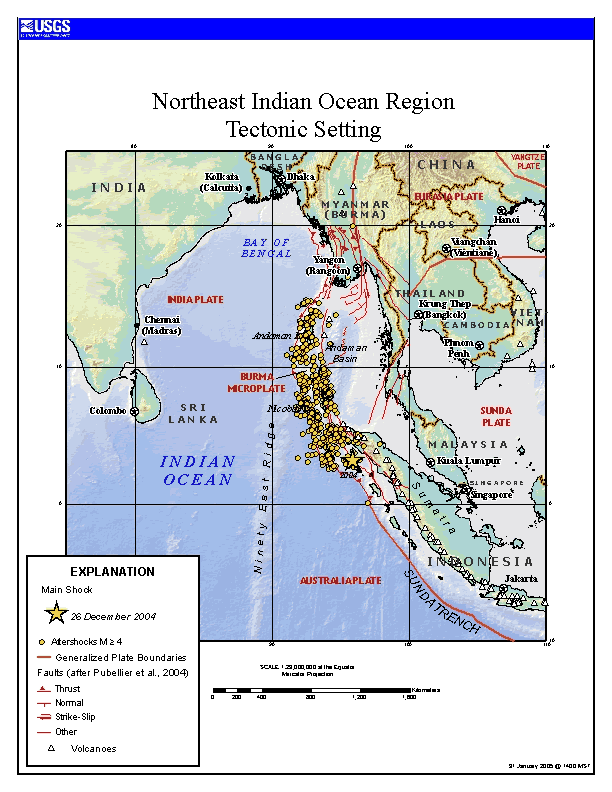
Tectonic setting of Sumatra earthquake (2004)

Running in a rough north–south line on the seabed of the Andaman Sea is the boundary between two tectonic plates, the Burma Plate and the Sunda Plate. These plates (or microplates) are believed to have formerly been part of the larger Eurasian Plate, but were formed when transform fault activity intensified as the Indian Plate began its substantive collision with the Eurasian continent. As a result, a back-arc basin center was created, which began to form the marginal basin which would become the Andaman Sea, the current stages of which commenced approximately 3–4 million years ago (Ma).

The boundary between two major tectonic plates results in high seismic activity in the region (see List of earthquakes in Indonesia). Numerous earthquakes have been recorded, and at least six, in 1797, 1833, 1861, 2004, 2005, and 2007, had a magnitude of 8.4 or higher. On 26 December 2004, a large portion of the boundary between the Burma plate and the Indo-Australian plate slipped, causing the 2004 Indian Ocean earthquake. This megathrust earthquake had a magnitude of 9.3. Between 1,300 and 1,600 kilometres (810 and 990 mi) of the boundary underwent thrust faulting and shifted by about 20 metres (66 ft), with the sea floor being uplifted several meters. This rise in the sea floor generated a massive tsunami with an estimated height of 28 meters (92 feet) that killed approximately 280,000 people along the coast of the Indian Ocean. The initial quake was followed by a series of aftershocks along the arc of the Andaman and Nicobar Islands. The entire event severely damaged the fishing infrastructure.

=== Volcanic activity ===
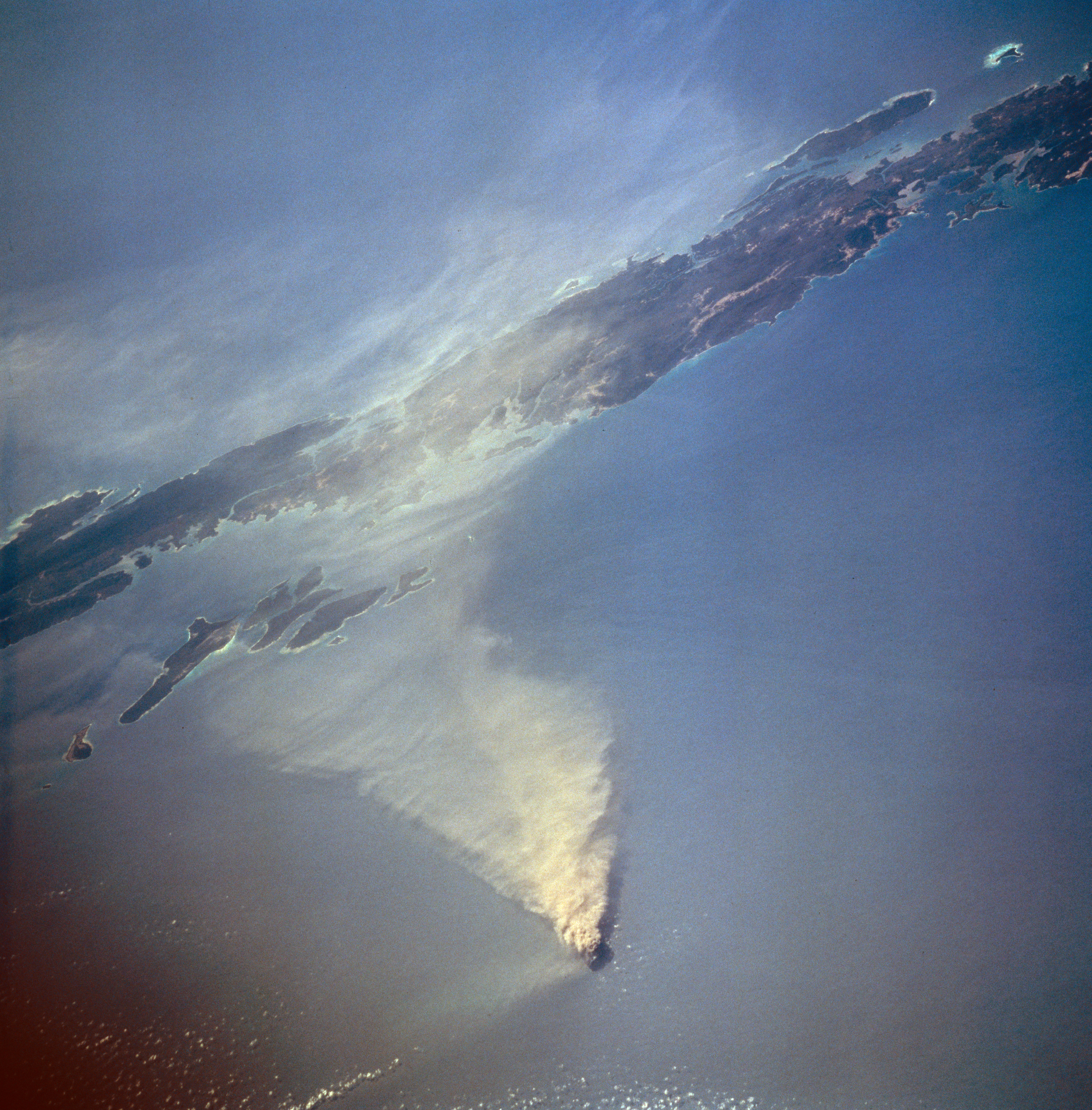
Eruption of the Barren Island volcano in 1995. Andaman Islands (on top) are c. 90 km distant

Within the sea, to the east of the main Great Andaman island group, lies Barren Island, the only currently active volcano associated with the Indian subcontinent. This island volcano is 3 km (2 mi) in diameter and rises 354 metres (1,161 ft) above sea level. Its recent activity resumed in 1991 after a quiet period of almost 200 years. It is caused by the ongoing subduction of the India plate beneath the Andaman island arc, which forces magma to rise in this location of the Burma plate. The last eruption started on 13 May 2008 and continues. The volcanic island of Narcondam, which lies further north, was also formed by this process. No records exist of its activity.

=== Sediments to the Sea ===
Collectively, the modern Ayeyarwady (Irrawaddy) and Thanlwin (Salween) rivers deliver >600 Mt/yr of sediment to the sea. Most recent studies show: 1) There is little modern sediment accumulating on the shelf immediately off the Ayeyarwady River mouths. In contrast, a major mud wedge with a distal depocenter, up to 60 metres (200 ft) in thickness, has been deposited seaward in the Gulf of Martaban, extending to approximately 130 metres (430 ft) water depth into the Martaban Depression. Further, 2) There is no evidence showing that modern sediment has accumulated or is transported into the Martaban Canyon; 3) a mud drape/blanket is wrapping around the narrow western Myanmar Shelf in the eastern Bay of Bengal. The thickness of the mud deposit is up to 20 metres (66 ft) nearshore and gradually thins to the slope at −300 metres (−980 ft) water depth, and likely escapes into the deep Andaman Trench; 4) The estimated total amount of Holocene sediments deposited offshore is approximately 1,290 by 109 tonnes (1,270 by 107 long tons; 1,422 by 120 short tons). If we assume this has mainly accumulated since the middle Holocene highstand (~6000 yr BP) like other major deltas, the historical annual mean depositional flux on the shelf would be 215 megatonnes (212,000,000 long tons; 237,000,000 short tons) per year, which is equivalent to ~35% of the modern Ayeyarwady-Thanlwin rivers derived sediments; 5) Unlike other large river systems in Asia, such as the Yangtze and Mekong, this study indicates a bi-directional transport and depositional pattern controlled by the local currents that are influenced by tides, and seasonally varying monsoons winds and waves.

== Climate ==
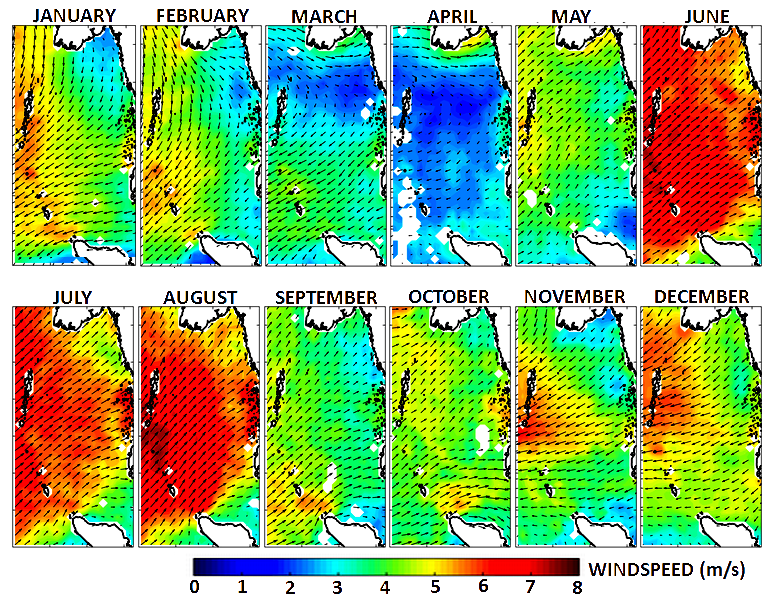
Monthly averaged winds in the Andaman Sea for the year 2011, expressed in mps

The climate of the Andaman Sea is determined by the monsoons of southeast Asia, as the prevailing winds reverse with the start of either season. The region experiences north-easterlies with an average windspeed of 5 m/s (18 km/h) from November to February. During these months, the western part of the domain experiences maximum wind intensity. It weakens by March–April and reverses to strong south-westerlies from May to September, with mean wind speeds touching 8 m/s (29 km/h) in June, July, and August, distributed near-uniformly over the entire basin. Wind speeds plummet by October and switch back to north-easterlies from November.

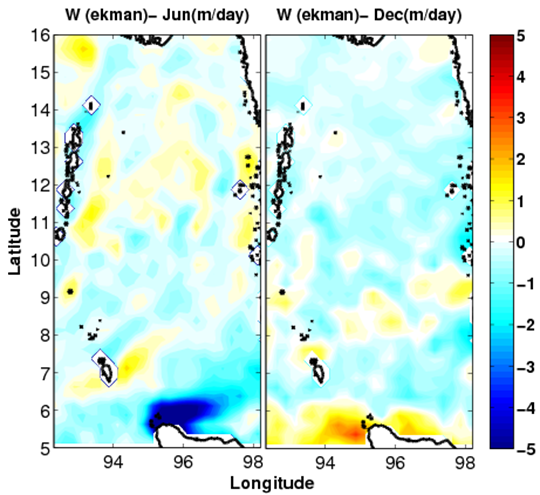
Monthly averaged Ekman pumping velocity (in m per day) for June and December

Air temperature is stable over the year at 26 °C (79 °F) in February and 27 °C (81 °F) in August. Precipitation is as high as 3,000 millimetres (120 in)/year and mostly occurs in summer. Sea currents are south-easterly and easterly in winter and south-westerly and westerly in summer. The average surface water temperature is 26–28 °C (79–82 °F) in February and 29 °C (84 °F) in May. The water temperature is constant at 4.8 °C (40.6 °F) at the depths of 1,600 metres (5,200 ft) and below. Salinity is 31.5–32.5‰ (parts per thousand) in summer and 30.0–33.0‰ in winter in the southern part. In the northern part, it decreases to 20–25‰ due to the inflow of freshwater from the Irrawaddy River. Tides are semidiurnal with an amplitude of up to 7.2 metres (24 ft).

The effect of wind stress on the ocean surface can be explained by wind stress curl. The net divergence of water in the ocean mixed layer results in Ekman pumping. The contrast between the two seasons elicits a very strong negative pumping velocity of more than 5 m (16 ft) per day along the north coast of Indonesia from May to September (shown here, June). This may signify coastal downwelling in the summer. It is also observed that the region develops a weak but positive pumping velocity of less than 3 m (9.8 ft) per day at the mouth of GC in winter (here, December).

== Current and wave fluid dynamics ==
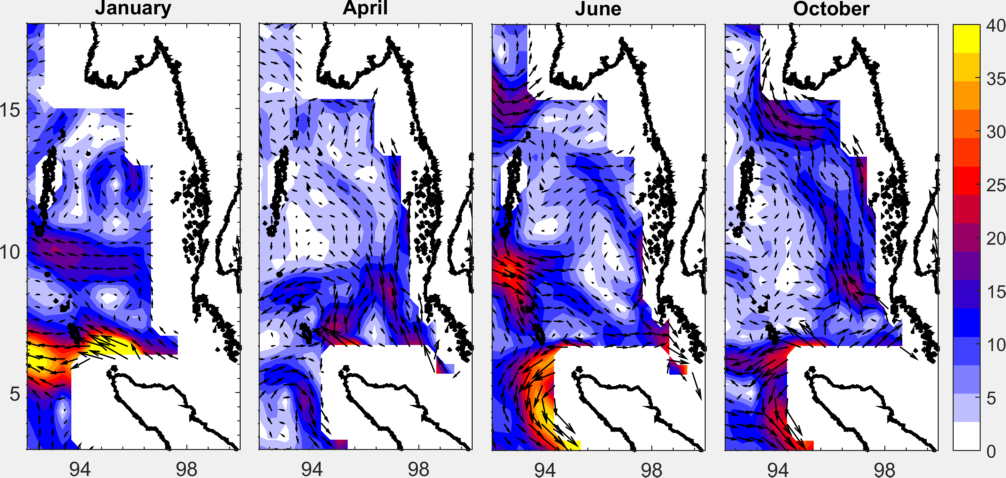
Monthly averaged OSCAR surface currents in January, April, June, and October, expressed in cm/s

Generally, currents are found to be stronger in the south than any other part of the basin. An intense surface outflux through GC, of the order of 40 cm/s (16 in/s), occurs during summers and winters. While this flow is directed westwards in winter, it is southwards along the west coast of Indonesia in summer. On the other hand, the TDC has strong surface influx in summer, which weakens by October. This is followed by a sturdy outflux in winter, which wanes by the month of April. Although the surface flow through PC is generally inward during summer monsoon, the preceding and succeeding months experience outflow (strong outflow in October, but weak outflow in April). During April and October, when the effects of local winds are minimal, Andaman Sea experiences the intensification of meridional surface currents in the poleward direction along the continental slope on the eastern side of the basin. This is characteristic of the propagation of Kelvin Waves.

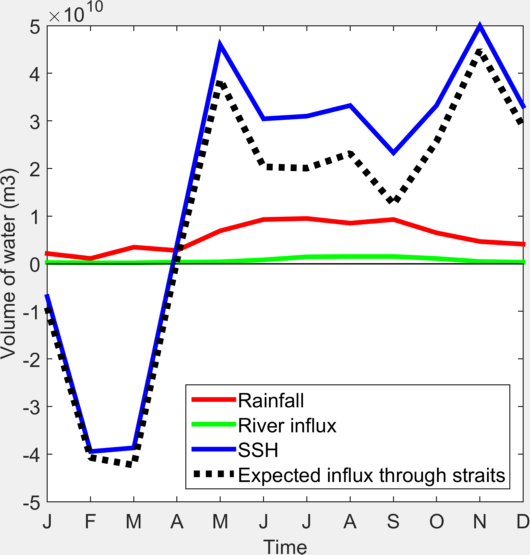
Temporal variations of the basin rainfall, river influx, and sea surface height anomaly, expressed in volume of water

It is observed that the water level rises in the basin between April and November with the maximum rate of piling up of water during April and October (marked by the steep slope of the curve). The rise in sea surface height (SSH) is attributed to rainfall, fresh water influx from rivers, and inflow of water through the three major straits. The first two of these are quantifiable and are hence expressed in volumes of water for comparison. From this, the expected influx through the straits (= SSH anomaly – Rainfall – River Influx) could be deduced. A possible fourth factor, evaporative losses, is negligible in comparison. (Previous studies show that the annual mean freshwater gain (precipitation minus evaporation) of the Andaman Sea is 120 centimetres (47 in) per year.) It is found that the SSH of the basin is primarily determined by the transport of water through the straits. The contributions from rainfall and rivers become substantial only during summer. Hence, a net inward flow occurs through the straits between April and November, followed by a net outward transport until March.

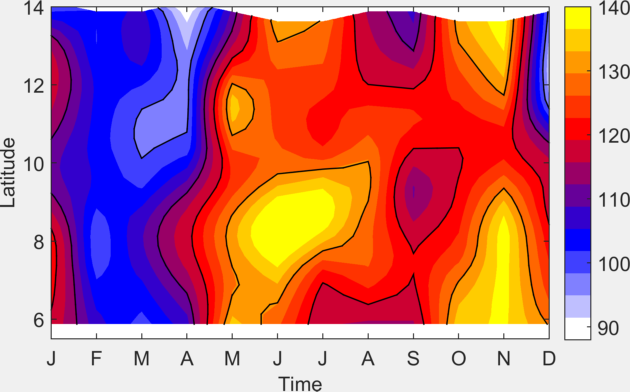
Temporal variation of depth of 20-degree isotherm (95°E to 96°E averaged) in metres

Evolution of relative vorticity in Andaman Sea

The basin has a very high rate of transport of water through the straits in April and October. This is a period of equatorial Wyrtki jets, which hit the coast of Sumatra and reflect back as Rossby waves and coastal Kelvin waves. These Kelvin waves are guided along the eastern boundary of Indian Ocean, and a part of this signal propagates into the Andaman Sea. The northern coast of Sumatra is the first to be affected. The 20 °C (68 °F) isotherm which deepens during the same period is suggestive of the downwelling nature of Kelvin waves. The waves further propagate along the eastern boundary of the Andaman Sea, which is confirmed by the differential deepening of the 20-degree isotherm along longitudes 94°E and 97°E (averaged over latitudes 8°N and 13°N). These longitudes are chosen so that one represents the western part of the basin (94°E) and the other along the steep continental slope on the eastern side of the basin (97°E). It is observed that both these longitudes experience deepening of the isotherms in April and October, but the effect is more pronounced at 97°E (isotherms deepen by 30 metres (98 ft) in April and 10 metres (33 ft) in October). This is a concrete signature of downwelling in the basin and is definitely not forced locally as the winds are weaker during this period. This confirms unequivocally that the sudden burst of water into the basin through the straits, the intensification of eastern boundary currents and the coincidental deepening of isotherms in April and October are the direct consequence of the propagation of downwelling Kelvin waves in the Andaman Sea, remotely forced by equatorial Wyrtki jets. The evolution of vorticity in the basin is suggestive of strong shear in the flow during different times of the year, and further indicates the presence of low frequency geophysical waves (such as westward propagating Rossby waves) and other transient eddies.

== Ecology ==
=== Flora ===
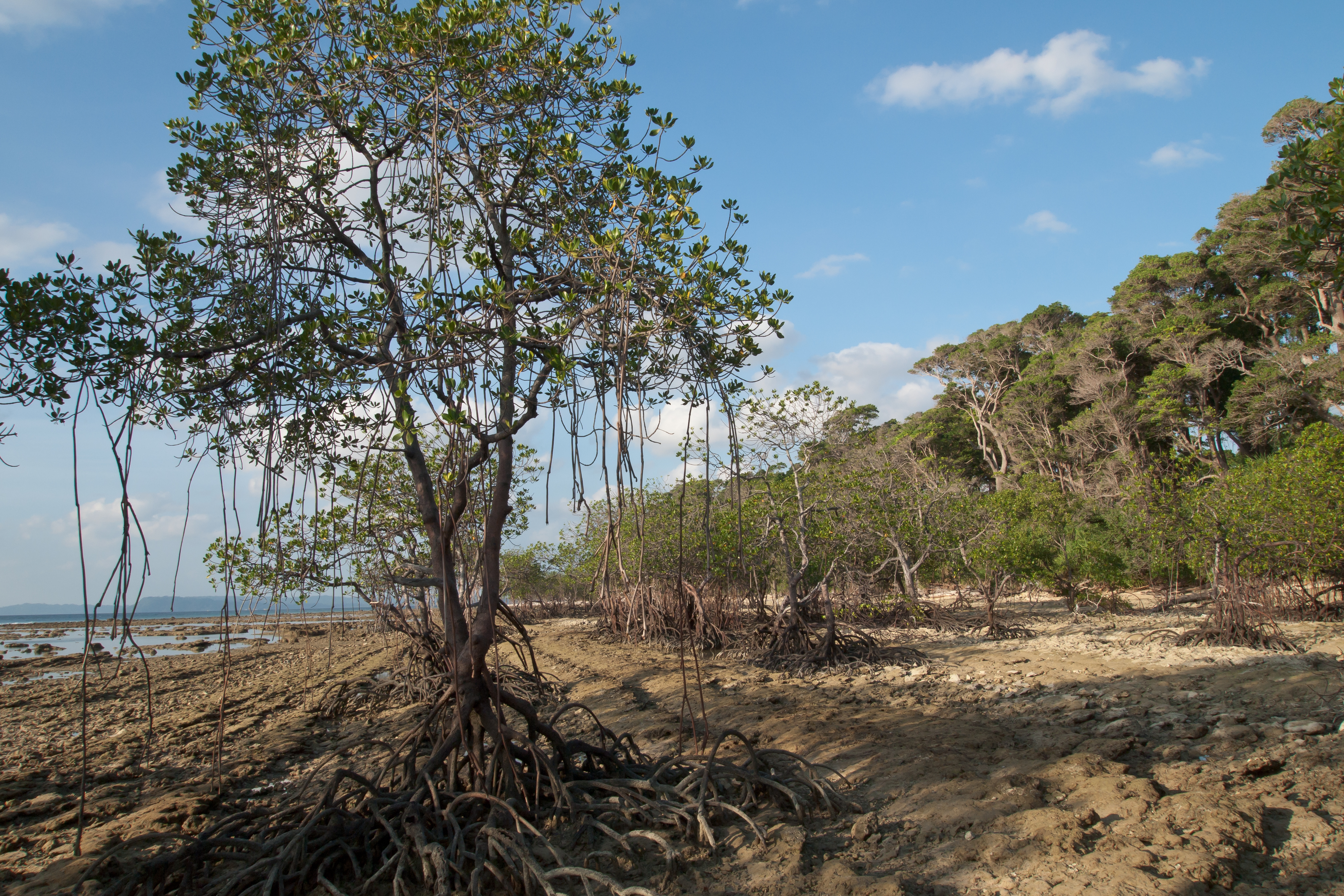
Mangrove trees on the coast, Neil Island, Andaman and Nicobar Islands

The coastal areas of the Andaman Sea are characterized by mangrove forests and seagrass meadows. Mangroves cover between more than 600 km^{2} (232 sq mi) of the Thai shores of Malay Peninsula whereas seagrass meadows occupy an area of 79 km^{2} (31 sq mi). Mangroves are largely responsible for the high productivity of the coastal waters – their roots trap soil and sediment and provide shelter from predators and nursery for fish and small aquatic organisms. Their body protects the shore from the wind and waves, and their detritus are a part of the aquatic food chain. A significant part of the Thai mangrove forests in the Andaman Sea was removed during the extensive brackish water shrimp farming in 1980s. Mangroves were also significantly damaged by the 2004 tsunami. They were partly replanted after that, but their area is still gradually decreasing due to human activities.

Other important sources of nutrients in the Andaman Sea are seagrass and the mud bottoms of lagoons and coastal areas. They also create a habitat or temporal shelter for many burrowing and benthic organisms. Many aquatic species migrate from and to seagrass either daily or at certain stages of their life cycle. The human activities which damage seagrass beds include waste water discharge from coastal industry, shrimp farms and other forms of coastal development, as well as trawling and the use of push nets and dragnets. The 2004 tsunami affected 3.5% of seagrass areas along the Andaman Sea via siltation and sand sedimentation and 1.5% suffered total habitat loss.

=== Fauna ===
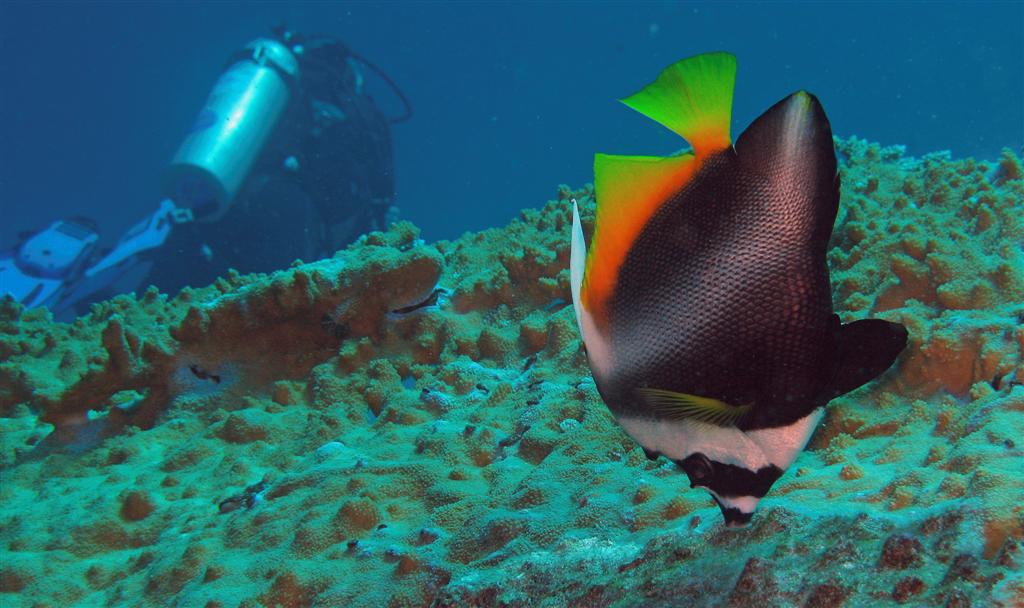
Phantom bannerfish (Heniochus pleurotaenia), Similan Islands, Thailand

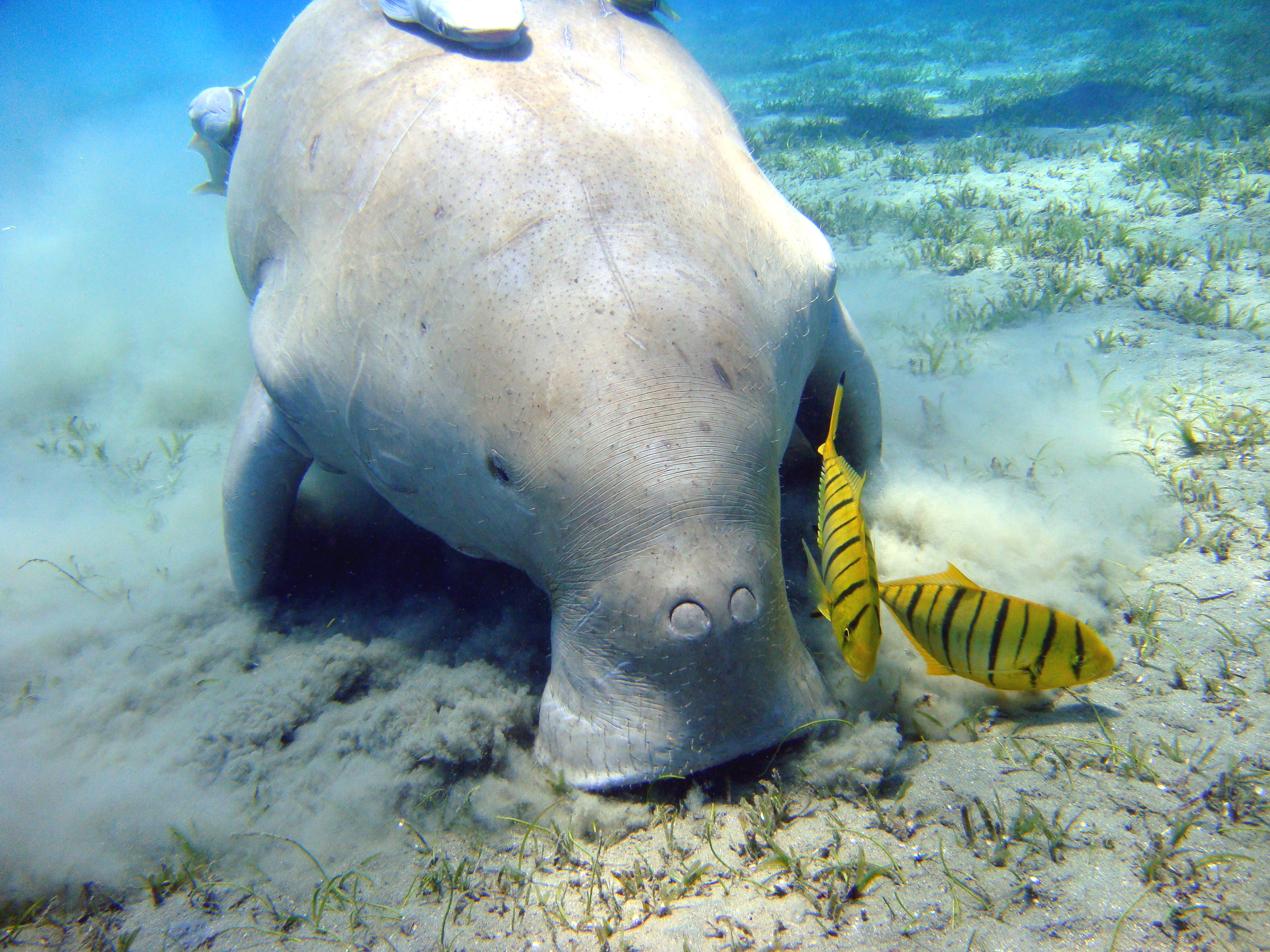
Dugong

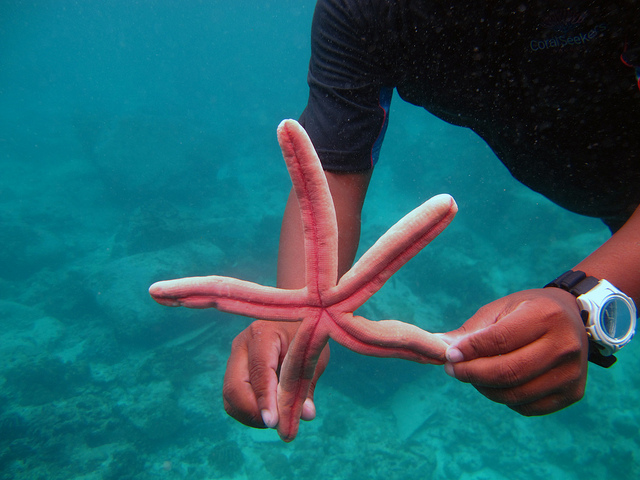
Starfish, Andaman Sea

The sea waters along the Malay Peninsula favor molluscan growth, and there are about 280 edible fish species belonging to 75 families. Of those, 232 species (69 families) are found in mangroves and 149 species (51 families) reside in seagrass; so 101 species are common to both habitats. The sea also hosts many vulnerable fauna species, including dugong (Dugong dugon), several dolphin species, such as Irrawaddy dolphin (Orcaella brevirostris) and four species of sea turtles: critically endangered leatherback turtle (Dermochelys coriacea) and hawksbill turtle (Eletmochelys imbricata) and threatened green turtle (Chelonia mydas) and olive ridley turtle (Lepidochelys olivacea). There are only about 150 dugongs in the Andaman Sea, scattered between Ranong and Satun Provinces. These species are sensitive to the degradation of seagrass meadows.

Coral reefs are estimated to occupy 73,364 rai (117 km^{2}) in the Andaman Sea with only 6.4 percent in ideal condition.

== Human activities ==
The sea has long been used for fishing and transportation of goods between the coastal countries.

=== Fishing ===
Thailand alone harvested about 943,000 t (2.079×10^{9} lb) of fish in 2005 and about 710,000 t (1.57×10^{9} lb) in 2000. Of those 710,000 t (1.57×10^{9} lb), 490,000 t (1.08×10^{9} lb) are accounted for by trawling (1,017 vessels), 184,000 t (406,000,000 lb) by purse seine (415 vessels), and about 30,000 t (66,000,000 lb) by gillnets. Of Thailand's total marine catch, 41% is caught in the Gulf of Thailand and 19% in the Andaman Sea. 40% is caught in waters outside Thailand's EEZ.

Production numbers are significantly smaller for Malaysia and are comparable, or higher, for Myanmar. Competition for fish resulted in numerous conflicts between Myanmar and Thailand. In 1998 and 1999, they resulted in fatalities on both sides and nearly escalated into a military conflict. In both cases, the Thai navy intervened when Burmese vessels tried to intercept Thai fishing boats in the contested sea areas, and Thai fighter aircraft were thought to be deployed by the National Security Council. Thai fishing boats were also frequently confronted by the Malaysian navy to the extent that the Thai government had to caution its own fishers against fishing without license in foreign waters.

The 2004 marine production in Thailand was composed of: pelagic fish 33 percent, demersal fish 18 percent, cephalopod 7.5 percent, crustaceans 4.5 percent, trash fish 30 percent and others 7 percent. Trash fish refers to non-edible species, edible species of low commercial value and juveniles, which are released to the sea. Pelagic fishes were distributed between anchovies (Stolephorus spp., 19 percent), Indo-Pacific mackerel (Rastrelliger brachysoma, 18 percent), sardinellas (Sardinellars spp., 14 percent), scad (11 percent), longtail tuna (Thunnus tonggol, 9 percent), eastern little tuna (Euthynnus affinis, 6 percent), trevallies (6 percent), bigeye scad (5 percent), Indian mackerel (Rastrelliger kanagurta, 4 percent), king mackerel (Scomberomorus cavalla, 3 percent), torpedo scad (Megalaspis cordyla , 2 percent), wolf herrings (1 percent), and others (2 percent). Demersal fish production was dominated by purple-spotted bigeye (Priacanthus tayenus), threadfin bream (Nemipterus hexodon), brushtooth lizardfish (Saurida undosquamis), slender lizardfish (Saurida elongata) and Jinga shrimp (Metapenaeus affinis). Most species are overfished since the 1970s–1990s, except for Spanish mackerel (Scomberomorus commersoni), carangidae and torpedo scad (Meggalaspis spp.). The overall overfishing rate was 333 percent for pelagic and 245 percent for demersal species in 1991. Cephalopods are divided into squid, cuttlefish and molluscs, where squid and cuttlefish in Thai waters consists of 10 families, 17 genera and over 30 species. The main mollusk species captured in the Andaman Sea are scallop, blood cockle (Anadara granosa) and short-necked clam. Their collection requires bottom dredge gears, which damage the sea floor and the gears themselves and are becoming unpopular. So, the mollusk production has decreased from 27,374 t (60,349,000 lb) in 1999 to 318 tonnes in 2004. While crustaceans composed only 4.5 percent of the total marine products in 2004 by volume, they accounted for 21 percent of the total value. They were dominated by banana prawn, tiger prawn, king prawn, school prawn, bay lobster (Thenus orientalis), mantis shrimp, swimming crabs and mud crabs. The total catch in 2004 was 51,607 t (113,774,000 lb) for squid and cuttlefish and 36,071 tonnes (79,523,000 lb) for crustaceans.

=== Mineral resources ===
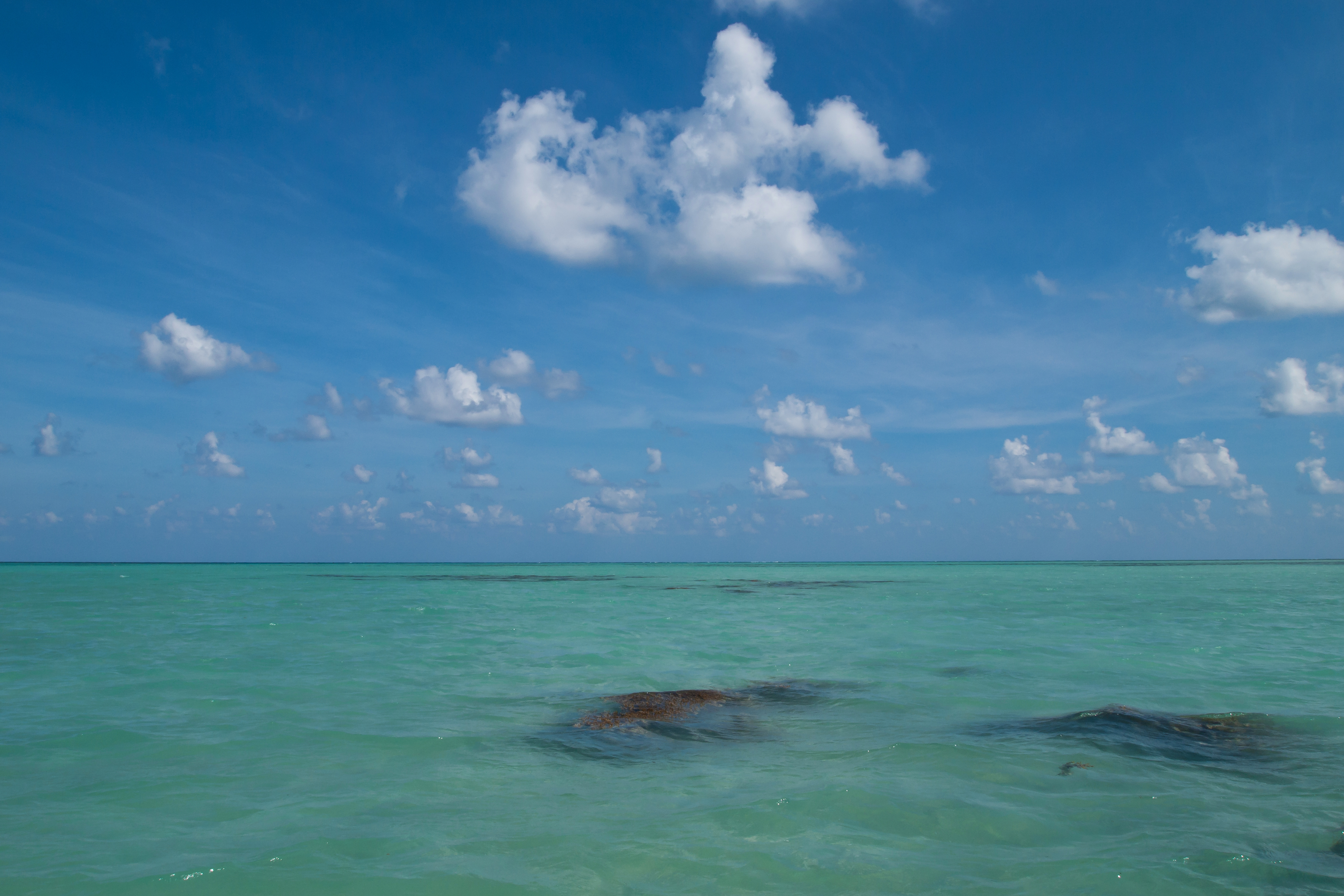
Andaman Sea off Havelock Island

The sea's mineral resources include tin deposits off the coasts of Malaysia and Thailand. Major ports are Port Blair in India; Dawei, Mawlamyine and Yangon in Myanmar; Ranong port in Thailand; George Town and Penang in Malaysia; and Belawan in Indonesia.

=== Tourism ===
The Andaman Sea, particularly the western coast of the Malay Peninsula, and the Andaman and Nicobar Islands of India and Myanmar are rich in coral reefs and offshore islands with spectacular topography. Despite having been damaged by the 2004 Sumatra earthquake and tsunami, they remain popular tourist destinations. The nearby coast also has numerous marine national parks – 16 only in Thailand, and four of them are candidates for inclusion into UNESCO World Heritage Sites.

=== Immigration ===
In recent years, the Andaman Sea has become a dangerous migration route, especially for Rohingya refugees fleeing violence, persecution, and poor living conditions in Myanmar and refugee camps in Bangladesh. Between 2022 and 2024, about 33,000 Rohingya fled by sea, with women and children making up a growing proportion of migrants. However, the journey is extremely risky: in 2024 alone, hundreds died or went missing, with estimates suggesting that nearly one in every 13 people on these routes did not survive. The situation has continued into 2025 and 2026, with more than 800 deaths reported in a single year across the region. Tragic incidents still occur, such as a boat capsizing in the Andaman Sea in April 2026 that left around 250 migrants missing.

== See also ==
- Countries of the Bay of Bengal
- History of Indian influence on Southeast Asia
- Kra Isthmus
- Maritime Silk Road
- Mergui Archipelago
- Moscos Islands
