= Indonesian Small Islands Directory =

Web directory listing small islands of Indonesia

Indonesian Small Islands Directory (Direktori Pulau-pulau Kecil Indonesia) is a web directory that lists small islands of Indonesia.

Established by 2007 Law 27 (Undang-Undang 27 Tahun 2007), it covers islands up to area of 2,000 km^{2} and their surrounding marine ecosystem.

The directory is managed by Direktorat Pendayagunaan Pulau-Pulau Kecil, Direktorat Jenderal Pengelolaan Ruang Laut, Kementerian Kelautan dan Perikanan, Republik Indonesia.

The database also is important in quantifying the long term task of verifying how many islands exist in Indonesia.

Difficulties in ascertaining information about the smaller islands of the Indonesian archipelago has been a serious long term issue - and the database is part of governmental efforts to verify and determine the issue.

== See also ==
- List of Indonesian islands by area
- List of Indonesian islands by population
- List of outlying islands of Indonesia
