= Mapia language =

Extinct language in Mapia Island, West Papua

Mapia
- Native to: Indonesia
- Region: Mapia Atoll, north of Cenderawasih Bay
- Extinct: end of 20th century
- Language family: Austronesian: Malayo-Polynesian; Oceanic; Micronesian; Nuclear Micronesian; Chuukic–Pohnpeic; Chuukic; Mapia

Language codes
- ISO 639-3: mpy
- Glottolog: mapi1250
- ELP: Mapia
- Mapia is classified as Extinct by the UNESCO Atlas of the World's Languages in Danger

Mapia is an extinct Micronesian language, the only one spoken in Indonesia. It was spoken on Mapia Atoll, 180 km north of the coast of New Guinea, part of Supiori Regency. The population emigrated early in the 20th century, the only speaker as of 2000 was an elderly man who had remained behind on the island. The rest of the population of Mapia are now Biak-speaking immigrants.
