= Lumbis =

District of Nunukan Regency, North Kalimantan

- District
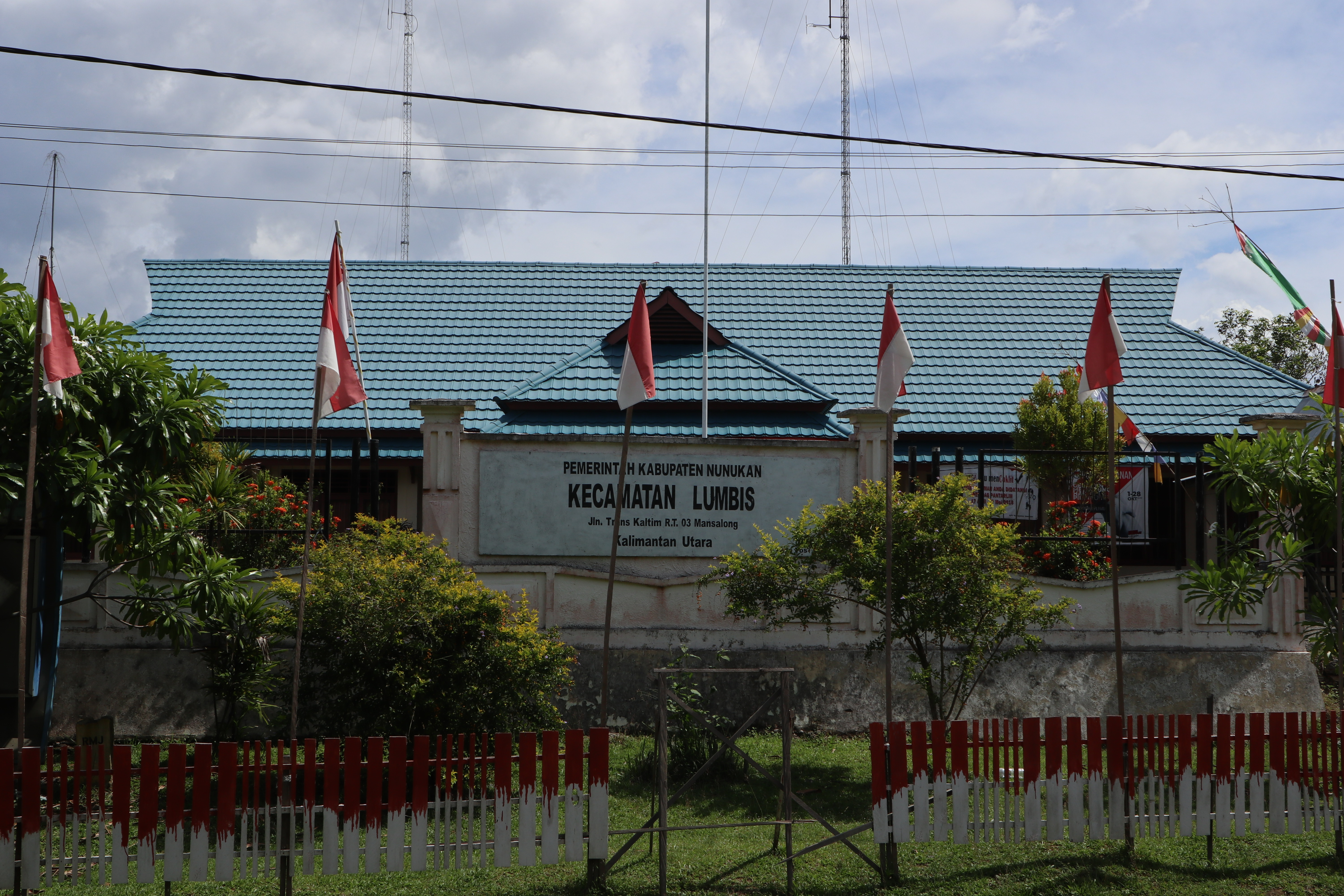
- Lumbis district office

- Location within North Kalimantan Location within Kalimantan Location within Indonesia
- Coordinates: 3°45′11.3015″N 116°44′26.447″E
- Country: Indonesia
- Province: North Kalimantan
- Regency: Nunukan
- District seat: Mansalong

Area
  - Total: 290.23 km^{2} (112.06 sq mi)

Population (2024)
  - Total: 6,990
  - Density: 24.1/km^{2} (62.4/sq mi)

Lumbis is a district (kecamatan) in Nunukan Regency, North Kalimantan, Indonesia. Lumbis is the district with the second largest area in Nunukan Regency, consisting of 28 village (after the expansion of Lumbis Ogong district ) with a total population of 6,990 people in 2024 estimate. The government center is in Mansalong Village.

== Geography ==
Lumbis District consists of 28 villages (desa):

- Bulan-Bulan
- Dabulon
- Deralon
- Kalampising
- Liang
- Libang
- Likos
- Lintong
- Mansalong
- Nainsid
- Pa'lemumut
- Pa'loo
- Patal I
- Patal II
- Podong
- Pulu Bulawan
- Saludan
- Sangkub
- Sapuyan
- Sasibu
- Sedongon
- Semalat
- Siawang
- Sumalumung
- Taluan
- Tanjung Hilir
- Tanjung Hulu
- Tubus
