= Berhala Island =

Berhala Island may refer to:

- Berhala Island, Sabah
- Berhala Island, Sumatra
- Berhala Island, Malacca Strait
