= Supiori =

Supiori may refer to:

- Supiori Island
- Supiori Regency
