= List of Indonesian islands by area =

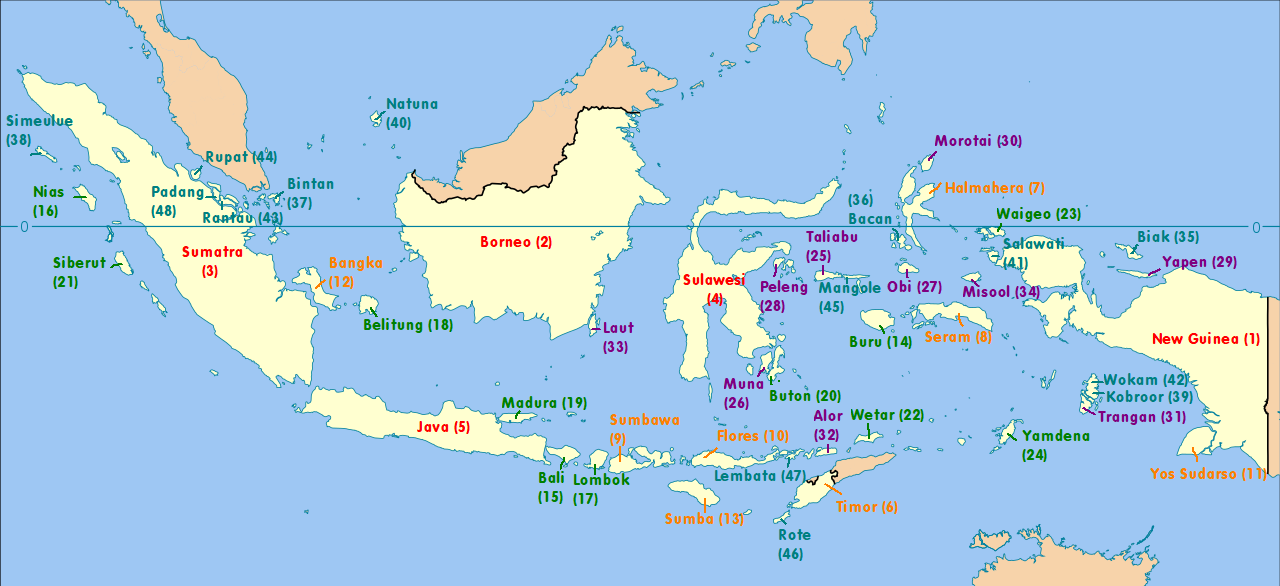
Indonesia map with name of islands larger than 1000 km^{2}

This list of Indonesian islands by area includes all Indonesian islands over 500 km^{2} in descending order by area.

Island's name	Area (km^{2})	Area (sq mi)	Population	Province(s), Country or countries
New Guinea	785,753	303,381	11,818,000	Indonesia (Western New Guinea) and Papua New Guinea
Borneo	748,168	288,869	21,258,000	Brunei, Malaysia and Indonesia (Central, East, North, South and West Kalimantan)
Sumatra	473,481	184,954	47,010,000	Indonesia (Aceh, Bengkulu, Jambi, Lampung, Riau and North, South and West Sumatra)
Sulawesi (Celebes)	180,681	69,761	17,371,783	Indonesia (Gorontalo and Central, North, South, South East Sulawesi and West Sulawesi)
Java	138,794	53,589	139,448,718	Indonesia (Banten, Jakarta, Yogyakarta and Central, East and West Java)
Timor	28,418	10,972	2,786,000	Indonesia (East Nusa Tenggara) and Timor-Leste
Halmahera	18,040	6,865	449,938	Indonesia (North Maluku)
Seram	17,454	6,621	434,113	Indonesia (Maluku)
Sumbawa	14,386	5,554	1,330,000	Indonesia (West Nusa Tenggara)
Flores	14,154	5,464	1,831,000	Indonesia (East Nusa Tenggara)
Yos Sudarso	11,742	4,534	13,322	Indonesia (South Papua)
Bangka	11,413	4,407	960,692	Indonesia (Bangka-Belitung Islands)
Sumba	10,711	4,135	686,113	Indonesia (East Nusa Tenggara)
Buru	8,473	3,271	162,116	Indonesia (Maluku)
Bali	5,416	2,091	4,220,000	Indonesia (Bali)
Nias	5,121	1,976	756,338	Indonesia (North Sumatra)
Lombok	4,625	1,786	3,160,000	Indonesia (West Nusa Tenggara)
Belitung	4,478	1,729	262,357	Indonesia (Bangka-Belitung Islands)
Madura	4,429	1,710	3,622,000	Indonesia (East Java)
Buton	4,408	1,699	447,408	Indonesia (South East Sulawesi)
Siberut	3,828	1,478	35,091	Indonesia (West Sumatra)
Wetar	3,600	1,390	7,937	Indonesia (Maluku)
Waigeo	3,154	1,218		Indonesia (Southwest Papua)
Yamdena	3,100	1,200		Indonesia (Maluku)
Taliabu	2,913	1,120		Indonesia (North Maluku)
Muna	2,889	1,115	268,140	Indonesia (South East Sulawesi)
Obi	2,542	981		Indonesia (North Maluku)
Peleng	2,345	905	109,319	Indonesia (Central Sulawesi)
Yapen	2,278	880		Indonesia (Papua)
Morotai	2,266	875		Indonesia (North Maluku)
Trangan	2,149	830		Indonesia (Maluku)
Alor	2,120	819	145,299	Indonesia (East Nusa Tenggara)
Laut	2,062	794		Indonesia (South Kalimantan)
Misool	2,034	785		Indonesia (Southwest Papua)
Biak	1,904	735	112,873	Indonesia (Papua)
Bacan	1,900	734		Indonesia (North Maluku)
Bintan	1,866	720	329,659	Indonesia (Riau Islands)
Simeulue	1,754	677		Indonesia (Aceh)
Kobroor	1,723	665		Indonesia (Maluku)
Natuna Besar	1,720	664		Indonesia (Riau Islands)
Salawati	1,623	627		Indonesia (Southwest Papua)
Wokam	1,604	619		Indonesia (Maluku)
Rantau	1,597	617		Indonesia (Riau)
Rupat	1,490	575		Indonesia (Riau)
Mangole	1,228	474		Indonesia (North Maluku)
Rote	1,226	473		Indonesia (East Nusa Tenggara)
Lembata	1,270	490		Indonesia (East Nusa Tenggara)
Padang	1,109	428		Indonesia (Riau)
Bengkalis	929	360	108,700	Indonesia (Riau)
Rangsang	908	350		Indonesia (Riau)
Pagai Selatan	900	347		Indonesia (West Sumatra)
Lingga	889	343		Indonesia (Riau Islands)
Kabaena	873	337		Indonesia (South East Sulawesi)
Karakelong	846	327		Indonesia (North Sulawesi)
Ambon	806	311	441,000	Indonesia (Maluku)
Singkep	757	292		Indonesia (Riau Islands)
Pantar	720	278		Indonesia (Riau)
Wowoni	715	276		Indonesia (Riau)
Komoran	695	268		Indonesia (Papua)
Selayar	666	261		Indonesia (South Sulawesi)
Supiori	659	254		Indonesia (Papua)
Samosir	630	243		Indonesia (North Sumatra)
Pagai Utara	622	240		Indonesia (West Sumatra)
Sipura	601	230		Indonesia (West Sumatra)
Sanana	558	215		Indonesia (Maluku)
Sangir	552	213		Indonesia (North Sulawesi)
Kai Besar	550	212		Indonesia (Maluku)
Adonara	509	197	132,345	Indonesia (East Nusa Tenggara)

== See also ==
- Indonesian Small Islands Directory
- List of Indonesian islands by population
- List of outlying islands of Indonesia
