= Benggala Island =

Island in Indonesia

Coordinates: 5°47′34″N 94°58′21″E

Benggala Island, also named Bateeleblah Island is one of Indonesian outlying islands located in Indian Ocean, southeast of Bengal Bay and south of Andaman Sea, bordering India's Exclusive economic zone. This island is the westernmost point of Indonesia, administratively part of Aceh Besar Regency, Aceh. This island is an uninhabited rocky island With total area about 4 hectares. Coral reefs can be found around the island's water, which make it suitable for eco-tourism.
