= Mount Batutara =

Stratovolcano on Komba island, Flores sea, Indonesia

Batutara Komba
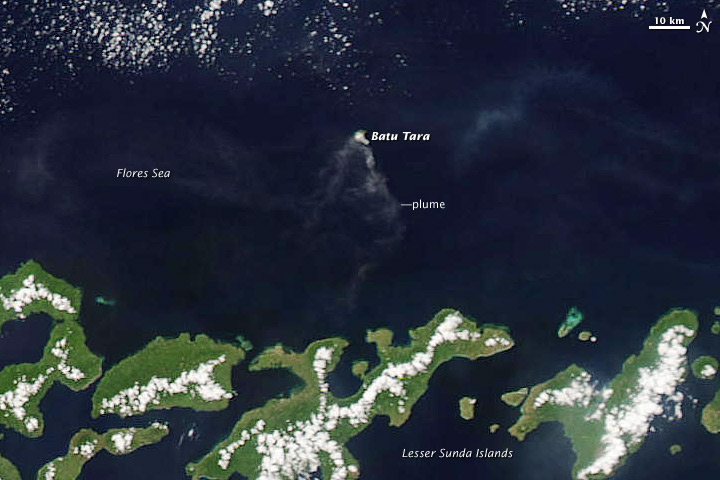
- Batu Tara and the Lesser Sunda Islands as seen from the NASA MODIS satellite.

Highest point
- Elevation: 748 m (2,454 ft)
- Coordinates: 7°47′28″S 123°35′06″E

Geography
- Location within Indonesia
- Location: East Nusa Tenggara
- Country: Indonesia

Geology
- Rock age: Holocene
- Mountain type: Stratovolcano
- Volcanic arc: Sunda Arc
- Last eruption: January 2007 – November 26, 2015

Batutara stratovolcano is a volcano located on the small isolated Komba Island in the Flores Sea in Indonesia. Vegetation covers the flanks of Batu Tara. The first historical eruption began in 1847 and ended in 1852 with explosions and lava flows.

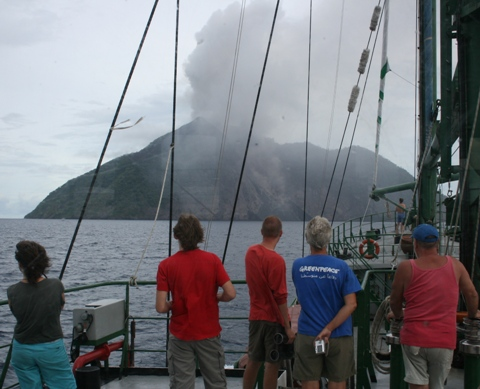
Batu Tara eruption, photo courtesy Mike Mate

== See also ==
- List of volcanoes in Indonesia
