= List of outlying islands of Indonesia =

Under a presidential decree in 2005, Indonesia has categorised 92 geographically isolated and distant islands as pulau terluar or "outlying islands". 67 of them are close to or are divided with a neighbouring country, and 28 are inhabited.

While the large islands of Borneo and New Guinea are shared with other countries, they are not considered "outlying".

== List ==
#	Name	Coordinates	Sea	Regency/City	Province	Neighbouring country
1	Alor Island	08°13′50″S 125°07′55″E	Ombai Strait	Alor	East Nusa Tenggara	East Timor
2	Ararkula Island	05°35′42″S 134°49′05″E	Arafura Sea	Southeast Maluku	Maluku	Australia
3	Asutubun Island	08°03′07″S 131°18′02″E	Timor Sea	Tanimbar Islands	Maluku	East Timor
4	Bangkit Island	01°02′52″N 123°06′45″E	Sulawesi Sea	Bolaang Mongondow	North Sulawesi	Philippines
5	Nusa Barung Island	08°30′30″S 113°17′37″E	Indian Ocean	Jember	East Java	Australia
6	Batarkusu Island	08°20′30″S 130°49′16″E	Timor Sea	Tanimbar Islands	Maluku	East Timor
7	Batek Island	09°15′30″S 123°59′30″E	Savu Sea	Kupang	East Nusa Tenggara	East Timor
8	Batu Bawaikang Island	04°44′46″N 125°29′24″E	Sulawesi Sea	Sangihe Islands	North Sulawesi	Philippines
9	Batu Berhanti Island	01°11′06″N 103°52′57″E	Singapore Straits	Batam	Riau Islands	Singapore
10	Batu Goyang Island	07°57′01″S 134°11′38″E	Arafura Sea	Southeast Maluku	Maluku	Australia
11	Batu Kecil Island	5°53′45″S 104°26′26″E	Indian Ocean	Pesisir Barat	Lampung	Australia
12	Batu Mandi Island	02°52′10″N 100°41′05″E	Malacca Straits	Bintan	Riau Islands	Malaysia
13	Benggala Island	05°47′34″N 94°58′21″E	Indian Ocean	Sabang	Aceh	India
14	Bepondi Island	00°24′10″S 135°16′15″E	Pacific Ocean	Biak Numfor	Papua	Palau
15	Berhala Island	03°46′38″N 99°30′03″E	Malacca Straits	Deli Serdang	North Sumatra	Malaysia
16	Bras Island	0.916667°N 134.333333°E	Pacific Ocean	Biak Numfor	Papua	Palau
17	Budd Island	00°32′08″N 130°43′52″E	Pacific Ocean	Sorong	Southwest Papua	Palau
18	Damar Island	02°44′29″N 105°22′46″E	South China Sea	Anambas Islands	Riau Islands	Malaysia
19	Pamana Island	11°00′36″S 122°52′37″E	Indian Ocean	Rote Ndao	East Nusa Tenggara	Australia
20	Rai Dana	10°50′00″S 121°16′57″E	Indian Ocean	Sabu Raijua	East Nusa Tenggara	Australia
21	Deli Island	07°01′00″S 105°31′25″E	Indian Ocean	Pandeglang	Banten	Australia
22	Dolangan Island	01°22′40″N 120°53′04″E	Sulawesi Sea	Tolitoli	Central Sulawesi	Malaysia
24	Enu Island	7.083333°S 134.5°E	Arafura Sea	Southeast Maluku	Maluku	Australia
25	Fani Island	1°4′0″N 131°16′0″E	Pacific Ocean	Sorong	Southwest Papua	Palau
26	Fanildo Island	00°56′22″N 134°17′44″E	Pacific Ocean	Biak Numfor	Papua	Palau
27	Gosong Makasar Island	03°59′25″N 117°57′42″E	Sulawesi Sea	Nunukan	East Kalimantan	Malaysia
28	Intata Island	04°38′38″N 127°09′49″E	Sulawesi Sea	Talaud	North Sulawesi	Philippines
29	Iyu Kecil Island	01°11′30″N 103°21′08″E	Malacca Strait	Karimun	Riau Islands	Malaysia
30	Jiew Island	00°43′39″N 129°08′30″E	Halmahera Sea	East Halmahera	North Maluku	Palau
31	Kakarutan Island	04°37′36″N 127°09′53″E	Pacific Ocean	Talaud Islands	North Sulawesi	Philippines
32	Karang Island	07°01′08″S 134°41′26″E	Arafura Sea	Southeast Maluku	Maluku	Australia
33	Karaweira Island	06°00′09″S 134°54′26″E	Arafura Sea	Southeast Maluku	Maluku	Australia
34	Karimun Kecil Island	01°09′59″N 103°23′20″E	Malacca Strait	Karimun	Riau Islands	Malaysia
35	Kawalusu Island	04°14′06″N 125°18′59″E	Sulawesi Sea	Sangihe Islands	North Sulawesi	Philippines
36	Kawio Island	04°40′16″N 125°25′41″E	Mindanao Sea	Sangihe Islands	North Sulawesi	Philippines
37	Kepala Island	02°38′42″N 109°10′04″E	South China Sea	Natuna	Riau Islands	Malaysia
38	Kisar Island	08°06′10″S 127°08′36″E	Wetar Strait	Tanimbar Islands	Maluku	East Timor
39	Kolepon Island	08°12′49″S 137°41′24″E	Arafura Sea	Merauke	Papua	Australia
40	South Kultubai Island	06°49′54″S 134°47′14″E	Arafura Sea	Southeast Maluku	Maluku	Australia
41	North Kultuba Island	06°38′50″S 134°50′12″E	Arafura Sea	Southeast Maluku	Maluku	Australia
42	Laag Island	05°23′14″S 137°43′07″E	Arafura Sea	Asmat	Papua	Australia
43	Larat Island	07°14′26″S 131°58′49″E	Arafura Sea	Tanimbar Islands	Maluku	Australia
44	Leti Island	08°14′20″S 127°37′50″E	Timor Sea	Tanimbar Islands Regency	Maluku	East Timor
45	Liki Island	01°34′26″S 138°42′57″E	Pacific Ocean	Jayapura	Papua	Papua-New Guinea
46	Lingian Island	00°59′55″N 120°12′50″E	Macassar Strait	Tolitoli	Central Sulawesi	Malaysia
47	Liran Island	08°03′50″S 125°44′00″E	Wetar Strait	Tanimbar Islands	Maluku	East Timor
48	Makalehi Island	02°44′15″N 125°09′28″E	Celebes Sea	Sangihe Islands	North Sulawesi	Philippines
49	Mangkai Island	03°05′32″N 105°35′00″E	South China Sea	Anambas Islands	Riau Islands	Malaysia
50	Mangudu Island	10°20′08″S 120°05′56″E	Indian Ocean	East Sumba	East Nusa Tenggara	Australia
51	Manterawu	01°45′47″N 124°43′51″E	Celebes Sea	Bolaang Mongondow	North Sulawesi	Philippines
52	Nusamanuk	07°49′11″S 108°19′18″E	Indian Ocean	Tasikmalaya	West Java	Australia
53	Marampit	04°46′18″N 127°08′32″E	Celebes Sea	Talaud Islands	North Sulawesi	Philippines
54	Maratua	02°15′12″N 118°38′41″E	Celebes Sea	Berau	East Kalimantan	Malaysia
55	Marore	04°44′14″N 125°28′42″E	Celebes Sea	Sangihe Islands	North Sulawesi	Philippines
56	Masela	08°13′29″S 129°49′32″E	Timor Sea	Tanimbar Islands	Maluku	East Timor
57	Meatimiarang	08°21′09″S 128°30′52″E	Timor Sea	Tanimbar Islands	Maluku	East Timor
59	Miangas	05°34′02″N 126°34′54″E	Celebes Sea	Talaud Islands	North Sulawesi	Philippines
60	Miossu	00°20′16″S 132°09′34″E	Pacific Ocean	Tambrauw	Southwest Papua	Palau
61	Nipa	01°09′13″N 103°39′11″E	Singapore Strait	Batam	Riau Islands	Singapore
62	Nongsa Island	01°12′29″N 104°04′47″E	Singapore Strait	Batam	Riau Islands	Singapore
63	Nusa Kambangan	07°47′05″S 109°02′34″E	Indian Ocean	Cilacap	Central Java	Australia
64	Panambulai Island	06°19′26″S 134°54′53″E	Arafura Sea	Southeast Maluku	Maluku	Australia
65	Panehan Island	08°22′17″S 111°30′41″E	Indian Ocean	Trenggalek	East Java	Australia
66	Pelampong Island	01°07′44″N 103°41′58″E	Singapore Strait	Batam	Riau Islands	Singapore
68	Rondo Island	06°04′30″N 95°06′45″E	Indian Ocean	Sabang	Aceh	India
70	Salando Island	01°20′16″N 120°47′31″E	Celebes Sea	Tolitoli	Central Sulawesi	Malaysia
72	Sambit Island	01°46′53″N 119°02′26″E	Celebes Sea	Berau	East Kalimantan	Malaysia
73	Sebatik Island	04°10′00″N 117°54′00″E	Macassar Strait	Nunukan	East Kalimantan	Malaysia
74	Sebetul Island	04°42′25″N 107°54′20″E	South China Sea	Natuna	Riau Islands	Vietnam
75	Sekatung Island	04°47′45″N 108°01′19″E	South China Sea	Natuna	Riau Islands	Vietnam
76	Sekel Island	08°24′24″S 111°42′31″E	Indian Ocean	Trenggalek	East Java	Australia
77	Selaru Island	08°10′17″S 131°07′31″E	Timor Sea	Tanimbar Islands	Maluku	Australia
78	Semiun Island	04°31′09″N 107°43′17″E	South China Sea	Natuna	Riau Islands	Malaysia
79	Sentut Island	01°02′52″N 104°49′50″E	Singapore Strait	Bintan	Riau Islands	Malaysia
80	Senua Island	04°00′48″N 108°25′04″E	South China Sea	Natuna	Riau Islands	Malaysia
85	Sophia Louisa Island	08°55′20″S 116°00′08″E	Indian Ocean	West Lombok	West Nusa Tenggara	Australia
86	Subi Kecil Island	03°01′51″N 108°54′52″E	South China Sea	Natuna	Riau Islands	Malaysia
87	Tokong Belayar Island	03°27′04″N 106°16′08″E	South China Sea	Anambas Islands	Riau Islands	Malaysia
88	Tokong Malang Biru Island	02°18′00″N 105°35′47″E	South China Sea	Anambas Islands	Riau Islands	Malaysia
89	Tokong Nanas Island	03°19′52″N 105°57′04″E	South China Sea	Anambas Islands	Riau Islands	Malaysia
90	Tokongboro Island	04°4′01″N 107°26′09″E	South China Sea	Anambas Islands	Riau Islands	Malaysia
91	Wetar Island	07°56′50″S 126°28′10″E	Banda Sea	Tanimbar Islands	Maluku	East Timor

== Statistics ==
=== Bordering countries ===
Indonesia's outlying islands share borders with the following 9 countries:

Country	Islands
Australia	23
East Timor	10
India	2
Malaysia	22
Palau	7
Papua New Guinea	1
Philippines	11
Singapore	4
Vietnam	2

=== Provinces ===
These outlying islands are located in one of the following 18 provinces:

Province	Islands
Aceh	6
Banten	1
Bengkulu	2
Riau Islands	20
Central Java	1
East Java	3
West Java	1
East Kalimantan	4
North Maluku	1
Maluku	18
West Nusa Tenggara	1
East Nusa Tenggara	5
Papua	6
Southwest Papua	3
Central Sulawesi	3
North Sulawesi	11
North Sumatra	3

== Potential disputes ==
According to Indonesia, amongst these outlying islands, 12 might be claimed by another nation:

Island	Locality	Description	Area (km^{2})
Rondo	Sabang, Aceh Province	Uninhabited except by a lighthouse keeper, located north of Weh Island at 06°04′31″N 95°06′47″E, bordering India at one of the entrances to the Malacca Straits.	
Sekatung	Natuna Islands, Riau Islands Province	Uninhabited, located at 04°47′0″N 108°01′00″E, bordering Vietnam, used as stopover point by Indonesian and foreign fishermen.	0.3
Nipa	Batam, Riau Islands	Uninhabited, bordering Singapore, consists for 80% of dead coral and for 20% of sand which is mainly exported to Singapore.	0.60
Berhala	Serdang Bedagai, North Sumatra	Situated in the Malacca Straits, bordering Malaysia	2.5
Marore	Sangihe Islands Regency, North Sulawesi	Bordering the Philippines 04°44′0″N 125°29′0″E	2.14
Miangas	Talaud Islands Regency, North Sulawesi	Bordering the Philippines. 05°33′0″N 126°35′0″E, 145 nautical miles from the island of Nanusa, and only 48 miles from the Philippines; 678 inhabitants (2003) speaking the Talaud language. The island's currency is the Philippine peso. The Dutch East India Company took control of the island in 1677. In 1891, the Philippines had incorporated Miangas in their territory but accepted the verdict of the Permanent Court of Arbitration in favour of Indonesia.	3.15
Marampit	Talaud Islands Regency, North Sulawesi	Situated at 04°46′18″N 127°08′32″E, bordering the Philippines, 1,436 inhabitants	12
Batek	Kupang Regency, East Nusa Tenggara	Called Fatu Sinai by East Timor, bordering the Oecusse District of East Timor. Turtle breeding ground and located on the migratory routes of dolphins	c. 0.25
Dana	Rote Ndao Regency, East Nusa Tenggara	Situated south of Rote Island at 10°59′30″S 122°51′43″E, bordering Australia, uninhabited.	
Fani	Raja Ampat Regency, Southwest Papua	Bordering Palau, inhabited, situated at 1.06667°N 131.267°E, 220 km and 35 hours by boat from the city of Sorong.	c. 9
Fanildo	Biak Numfor Regency, Papua	One of the Mapia Islands, uninhabited, bordering Palau, situated at 280 km from Biak Numfor at 0.56°N 134.18°E	c. 0.1
Bras	Biak Numfor Regency, Papua	One of the Mapia Islands, uninhabited, bordering Palau, situated at 280 km from Biak Numfor, c. 50,000 inhabitants.	c. 3.375

== See also ==
- Foreign relations of Indonesia
- Indonesia–Malaysia border
- Indonesian Small Islands Directory
