= Komba Island =

Island in Lembata Regency, East Nusa Tenggara Province, Indonesia

Native name: Pulau Komba
- Interactive map of Komba Island

Geography
- Coordinates: 7°47′31″S 123°34′44″E
- Adjacent to: Banda Sea
- Highest point: Mount Batutara

Administration
- Indonesia
- Province: East Nusa Tenggara
- Regency: Lembata Regency

Demographics
- Population: 0

Additional information
- Time zone: UTC+8

Komba Island is a small uninhabited and isolated volcanic island in the Banda Sea, Indonesia, approximately 70 km north of Lembata Island. The island is administratively part of Lembata Regency, East Nusa Tenggara. The island's volcano, Mount Batutara, is known to erupt every 20 minutes.
