= List of Indonesian islands by population =

This is a list of the most populous islands in Indonesia, sorted from the highest to lowest. This list also includes the respective islands' population density as well as their most populous settlements (all of its population statistics are taken from 2014 data, unless noted as otherwise) and comparisons with other countries and territories.

== List ==
Ranking	Island	Population	Province(s)	Density (/km^{2})	Largest settlements	Country/territory of similar population
1	Java	151,600,000 (2020) (Note: Composed of 6 provinces excluding the four regencies comprising Madura island)	Banten, West Java, DKI Jakarta, Central Java, East Java, Special Region of Yogyakarta	1,117	Jakarta (10,012,271)	Russia
2	Sumatra	60,100,000 (2021) (Note: Composed of 8 provinces including minor outlying islands)	Aceh, Bengkulu, Jambi, Lampung, Riau, West Sumatra, South Sumatra, North Sumatra	90.4	Medan (2,497,183)	Italy
3	Sulawesi	20,568,411 (2023) (Note: Composed of 6 provinces)	West Sulawesi, North Sulawesi, Central Sulawesi, South Sulawesi, Southeast Sulawesi, Gorontalo	97	Makassar (1,398,801)	Kazakhstan
4	Kalimantan (Indonesian part of Borneo)	17,259,155 (2023)	Central Kalimantan, East Kalimantan, North Kalimantan, South Kalimantan, West Kalimantan	28	Samarinda (842,691)	Cambodia
5	Papua (Indonesian part of New Guinea)	5,601,888 (2022)	Central Papua, Highland Papua, Papua, South Papua, Southwest Papua, West Papua	9.6	Jayapura (315,872)	Finland
6	Bali	4,404,300 (2012)	Bali	748.7	Denpasar (856,412)	Kuwait
7	Madura	3,622,000 (2010)	East Java	700.8	Bangkalan (94,729) (2010)	Uruguay
8	Lombok	3,160,000 (2010)	West Nusa Tenggara	700	Mataram (420,941)	Armenia
9	West Timor (Indonesian part of Timor)	2,016,451 (2014)	East Nusa Tenggara	127.2	Kupang (364,014)	Latvia
10	Flores	1,831,000 (2010)	East Nusa Tenggara	135	Maumere (52,921)	Kosovo
11	Sumbawa	1,330,000 (2010)	West Nusa Tenggara	91.45	Bima (148,984)	Estonia
12	Batam	1,142,646 (2014)	Riau Islands	≈650	Batam (1,142,646)	Eswatini
13	Bangka Island	960,692 (2010)	Bangka-Belitung	82.65	Pangkal Pinang (145,945)	Fiji
14	Nias	788,132 (2014)	North Sumatra	147.8	Gunungsitoli (139,281) (2017)	Guyana
15	Sumba	685,186 (2010)	East Nusa Tenggara	61.4	Waingapu (37,459) (2013)	Solomon Islands
16	Halmahera	449,938 (2010)	North Maluku	25.3	Tobelo (34,099) (2016)	Brunei
17	Buton	447,408 (2010)	Southeast Sulawesi	101.4	Baubau (137,118) (2010)	Brunei
18	Ambon Island	441,000 (2010)	Maluku	569	Ambon (368,987)	Brunei
19	Seram	434,113 (2010)	Maluku	25.4	Masohi (38,735) (2012)	Brunei
20	Bintan	329,659 (2010)	Riau Islands	139.39	Tanjung Pinang (204,735) (2017)	Iceland
21	Belitung	271,868 (2014)	Bangka-Belitung	56.63	Tanjung Pandan (95,136)	French Polynesia
22	Muna	268,140 (2010)	Southeast Sulawesi	92.8	Raha (53,436)	French Polynesia
23	Tarakan	253,026 (2016)	North Kalimantan	956	Tarakan (253,026) (2016)	Abkhazia
24	Ternate	204,215 (2014)	North Maluku	1,667	Ternate (204,215)	Samoa
25	Buru	162,828 (2010)	Maluku	17	Namlea (37,105) (2010)	Curaçao
26	Alor	145,299 (2010)	East Nusa Tenggara	51.9	Kalabahi (50,927) (2017)	Curaçao
27	Laut	140,081 (2010)	South Kalimantan	66.76	Kotabaru	Kiribati
28	Rote	119,711 (2010)	East Nusa Tenggara	99.7	Namodale (3,047) (2010)	Aruba
29	Lembata	117,829 (2010)	East Nusa Tenggara	93	Nubatukan (33,236)	Aruba
30	Biak	112,873 (2010)	Papua	51.3	Biak Kota (105,450)	Aruba
31	Peleng	109,319 (2010)	Central Sulawesi	45.4	-	Saint Vincent and the Grenadines
32	Bengkalis	108,700 (2010)	Riau	119.3	Bengkalis (72,961)	Grenada
33	Adonara	104,514 (2010)	East Nusa Tenggara	205.1	Lamahala Jaya (5,744) (2010)	U.S. Virgin Islands

Only Indonesian territory is counted in divided islands, which are indicated with brackets and italic text after the respective islands' name

== See also ==
- List of Indonesian islands by area
