= Kepala Island =

Island in Indonesia

Location of Kepala Island

Kepala Island is one of the outlying islands of Indonesia. The island is located in the South China Sea, northwest of Sarawak, East Malaysia. The island is part of Natuna Regency, and is the easternmost territory of Riau Islands province. The island is frequently visited by local fishermen for fishery purposes. At the center of the island there is a 30-meters high lighthouse, while the island itself is accessible by boat.
