= Mapia Atoll =

Atoll in Indonesia

Native name: Piken or Pegun (Mapia: sand island) Mapia (Sangir: pretty, good, beautiful) Myos Maninei (Biak: seagull island)
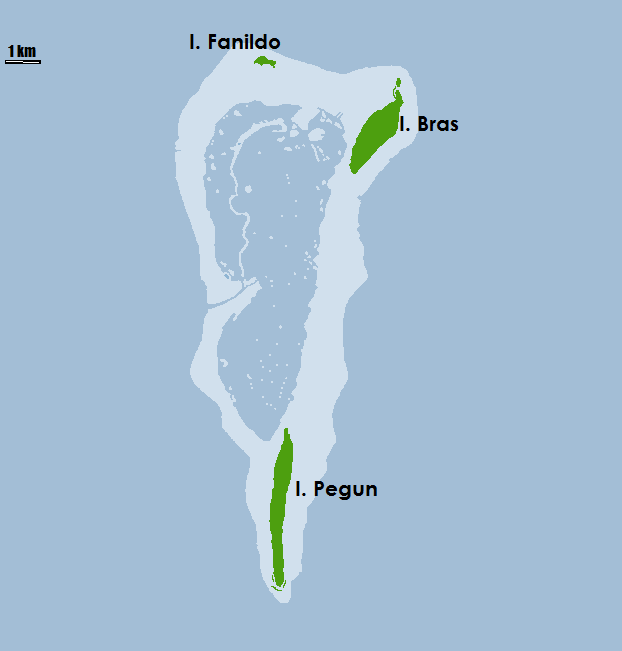

- Location within Western New Guinea Location within Indonesia

Geography
- Location: Pacific Ocean
- Coordinates: 0°54′32″N 134°18′17″E
- Total islands: 5

Administration
- Indonesia
- Province: Papua

Mapia Atoll (Indonesian: Kepulauan Mapia), historically known as the Freewill Islands or San David, is an atoll in the Pacific Ocean. It is located in Papua province of Indonesia, approximately 190 kilometers north of the city of Manokwari and 630 kilometers from the islands of Palau. It consists of two main islands, Bras (Berasi) and Pegun (Mapia), the smaller Fanildo, and two minor islands, Bras Kecil (Little Bras) and Fanildo Kecil (Little Fanildo). The islands constitute a part of West Supiori District within Supiori Regency, Papua. The population at the 2020 Census was 199.

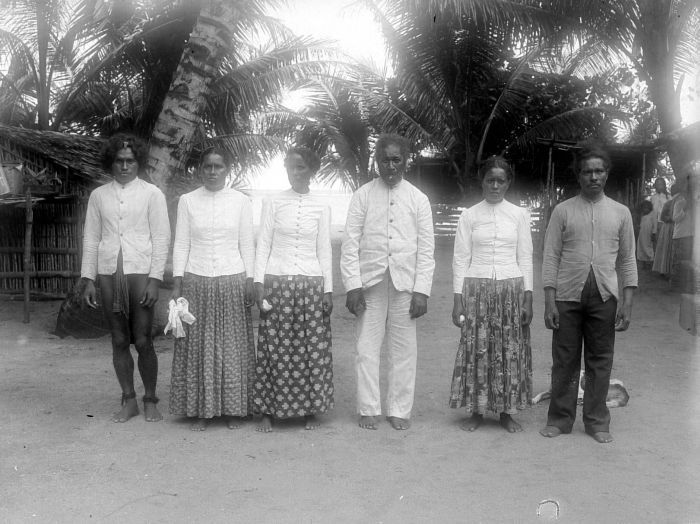
The Sangaji Marwedi (King of Mapia) and his family photographed during Arthur Wichmann's 1903 New Guinea expedition

The atoll was once part of the Spanish Empire under the name of Güedes. According to Spanish researcher Emilio Pastor in a paper submitted to his government in 1948, a number of small islands in Micronesia (Kapingamarangi or Coroa, Mapia or Güedes, Ocea (now Kiritimati) or Matador, and Rongerik or Pescadores) continue legally under Spanish sovereignty. This is because the text of the German–Spanish Treaty of 1899 which transferred sovereignty of certain Spanish possessions in the Pacific to Germany, namely the Northern Mariana Islands (except Guam) and the Caroline Islands (including Palau), failed to include these smaller islands. Although the Spanish government studied the case in 1949 and accepted this interpretation, it has never formally reclaimed the islands.

The atoll was part of Tidore Sultanate as part of the Papoua Gam Sio ("The Nine Negeri of Papua"), and the local Mapia chieftain was given the title Sangaji Meraudi. Biak sailors have been sailing to the island for centuries, primarily from Supiori, after returning from this journey they will tattoo themselves in the shape seagull (Manmarmar).

The extinct Mapia language was spoken on the islands until the end of the 20th century. As of 2000, according to Ethnologue, there was one elderly speaker of the language remaining on the islands.
