= Sota, South Papua =

Sota Kampung Sota
- Village
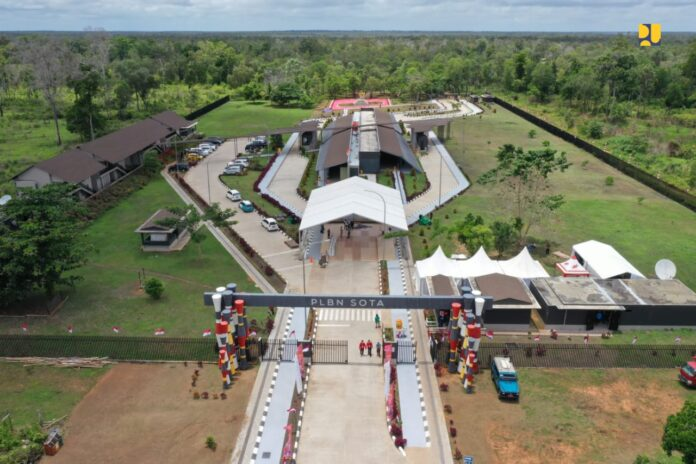
- Sota National Border Crossing Post

- Location in Papua and Indonesia Sota (Indonesia)
- Coordinates: 8°25′21.9288″S 140°59′53.1312″E
- Country: Indonesia
- Province: South Papua
- Regency: Merauke
- District: Sota
- Elevation: 72 ft (22 m)

Population (2010)
  - Total: 1,300
- Time zone: UTC+9 (Indonesia Eastern Standard Time)

Sota is a village in Sota district, Merauke Regency in South Papua province, Indonesia. Its population is 1,300. Sota and Jayapura are the only places with a direct road connection from Indonesia to Papua New Guinea.

== National Border Crossing Post ==
The Indonesian government plans to start the Sota National Border Crossing Post (PLBN Sota) construction project in January 2019. Sota is Indonesia's front line which borders directly with Papua New Guinea, 80 km from Merauke town, can be reached in 1–2 hours travel time.

== Climate ==
Sota has a tropical monsoon climate (Am) with moderate to little rainfall from May to November and heavy rainfall from December to April.

Climate data for Sota
Month	Jan	Feb	Mar	Apr	May	Jun	Jul	Aug	Sep	Oct	Nov	Dec	Year
Mean daily maximum °C (°F)	30.9 (87.6)	30.8 (87.4)	30.8 (87.4)	30.8 (87.4)	30.2 (86.4)	29.2 (84.6)	28.5 (83.3)	29.0 (84.2)	30.3 (86.5)	31.1 (88.0)	32.0 (89.6)	31.7 (89.1)	30.4 (86.8)
Daily mean °C (°F)	26.9 (80.4)	26.9 (80.4)	27.0 (80.6)	26.8 (80.2)	26.4 (79.5)	25.5 (77.9)	24.8 (76.6)	24.9 (76.8)	25.7 (78.3)	26.5 (79.7)	27.2 (81.0)	27.3 (81.1)	26.3 (79.4)
Mean daily minimum °C (°F)	23.0 (73.4)	23.0 (73.4)	23.2 (73.8)	22.9 (73.2)	22.7 (72.9)	21.8 (71.2)	21.2 (70.2)	20.9 (69.6)	21.1 (70.0)	21.9 (71.4)	22.4 (72.3)	22.9 (73.2)	22.3 (72.1)
Average precipitation mm (inches)	266 (10.5)	245 (9.6)	263 (10.4)	184 (7.2)	126 (5.0)	62 (2.4)	48 (1.9)	33 (1.3)	51 (2.0)	77 (3.0)	108 (4.3)	243 (9.6)	1,706 (67.2)
Source: Climate-Data.org
