= Ie Meulee =

- Urban village

Other transcription(s)
- Location in Sumatra, Indonesia and the Bay of Bengal Ie Meulee (Indonesia) Ie Meulee (Bay of Bengal)
- Coordinates: 5.8938353°N 95.3241073°E
- Country: Indonesia
- Province: Aceh
- City: Sabang
- Time zone: UTC+7 (Indonesia Western Time)

Ie Meulee is an urban village (kelurahan) in Sukajaya district, Sabang, Aceh, Indonesia. Ie Meulee in Acehnese means 'elephant footprint' which comes from the discovery of an inscription with elephant treads in this urban village. Ie Meulee is the northernmost settlement in the territory of Indonesia, with the population, most of whom work as fishermen. This urban village has several tourist attractions, namely Sumur Tiga Beach, which has clear water and Tapak Gajah Beach, which has historical heritage in the form of a Japanese fort.
