= Berhala Island (Malacca Strait) =

Island in Indonesia

Coordinates: 3°46′27″N 99°29′58″E

Berhala island is island of Sumatra in Indonesia about 0.36 km^{2}.

It is located in the Malacca Strait between Medan and Perak., and is one of the 92 officially listed outlying islands of Indonesia.
