= Point Lumpatang =

Point in Indonesia

Coordinates: 2°47′07″S 118°45′26″E

Point Lumpatang (Indonesian: Ujung Lumpatang) is a beach and cape located in West Tapalang subdistrict, Mamuju Regency, West Sulawesi. The cape is the westernmost point of Sulawesi. The waters around the cape is rich in squids.
