= Point Raja =

Cape in Aceh, Indonesia

Coordinates: 5°31′39″N 95°11′37″E

Point Raja (Indonesian: Ujung Raja, Acehnese: Ujong Raja, Dutch: Oedjong Raja), literally means "king's point", is a cape located in Peukan Bada subdistrict, Aceh Besar Regency, Aceh, Indonesia. The cape is the westernmost point of Sumatra. Point Raja is known for its wildlife and high, dangerous waves. The cape is one of main capes for ocean voyaging around the bays of Aceh. Oedjong means "cape" or "point" in Dutch language on maps of the Netherlands East Indies (Indonesia).

According to the International Hydrographic Organization's definitions of Bay of Bengal, Andaman Sea and Malacca Strait, it is the southeasternmost point of Bay of Bengal and the southwesternmost point of Andaman Sea. Immediately southeast of Andaman Sea lies Malacca Strait which is not part of Andaman Sea. To southeast of Malacca Strait lies Singapore Strait.

== See also ==
- Maritime Silk Route
- Srivijaya empire
