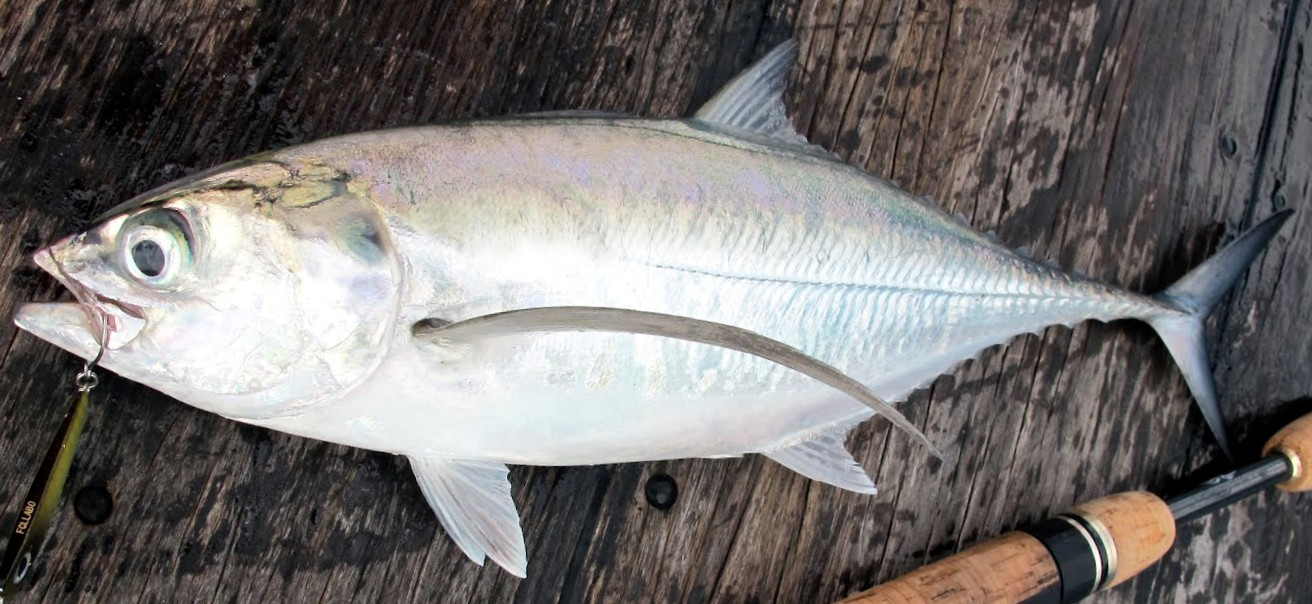

Conservation status
- Least Concern (IUCN 3.1)

Scientific classification
- Kingdom: Animalia
- Phylum: Chordata
- Class: Actinopterygii
- Order: Carangiformes
- Suborder: Carangoidei
- Family: Carangidae
- Subfamily: Caranginae
- Genus: Megalaspis; Bleeker, 1851
- Species: M. cordyla

Binomial name
- Megalaspis cordyla (Linnaeus, 1758)
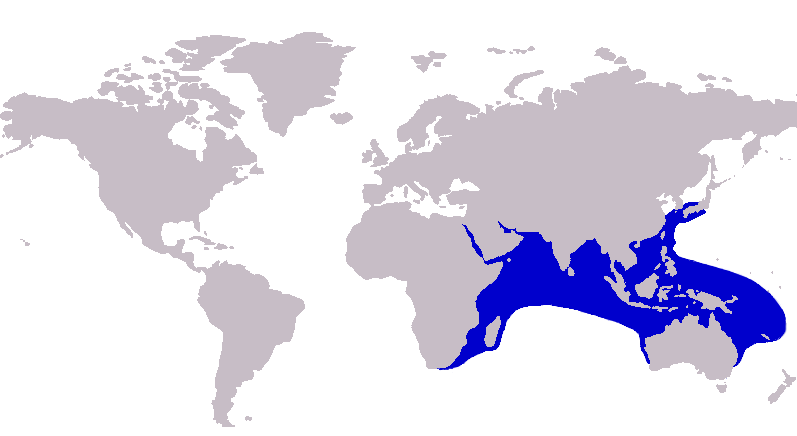
- Approximate range of the torpedo scad

Synonyms
- Scomber cordyla Linnaeus, 1758; Scomber rottleri Bloch, 1793; Caranx rottleri (Bloch, 1793); Citula plumbea Quoy & Gaimard, 1825

= Torpedo scad =

Species of fish

The torpedo scad (Megalaspis cordyla), also known as the hardtail scad, finny scad, finletted mackerel scad or cordyla scad, is a species of moderately large marine fish classified in the jack and horse mackerel family, Carangidae. The torpedo scad is distributed throughout the tropical Indo-Pacific region, ranging from South Africa in the west to Tonga in the east, extending to Japan in the north and Australia in south. It is a schooling pelagic fish which occupies the surface layers of both inshore and offshore oceanic waters. The torpedo scad is easily identified by both its 'torpedo' shaped body and a series of detached finlets at the rear of both the dorsal and anal fins. The largest recorded individual was 80 cm long and weighed 4 kg, although it is more common at lengths less than 40 cm. It is a predatory species, taking a variety of fish, cephalopods and crustaceans by both active and filter feeding. There is a shift in diet as the species grow; however fish is the dominant prey in all size classes. Torpedo scad reach sexual maturity at 22 cm in females and 26.4 cm in males, with spawning occurring between March and July in India, where significant research into larval growth and morphometrics has been carried out.

The torpedo scad is of major importance to fisheries throughout the Indo-Pacific, including India. Statistics (which exclude India) show the annual catch of the species has risen from 70,000 tonnes in 1997 to 107,000 tonnes in 2007. The major users of the species from this data are Indonesia and Malaysia. The torpedo scad is often taken by anglers, however it is considered only marginal table fare and is occasionally used as bait.

== Taxonomy and phylogeny ==
The torpedo scad is the only member of the monotypic genus Megalaspis, which is one of the thirty genera in the family Carangidae, which in turn is part of the order Carangiformes.

The species was first scientifically described by Carl Linnaeus, a famed Swedish naturalist who is widely considered the father of modern taxonomy. The specimen described by Linnaeus was erroneously described as being from "America", and no holotype is known for the species. Ronald Frick designated a neotype for the species in 1999, however this was rejected as it failed to satisfy ICZN regulations. Linnaeus named the species Scomber cordyla, placing the fish in the true mackerel genus, which was a common practice before the family Carangidae was recognised. The specific epithet is Latin for "mackerel" or "young tunny (tuna)". A second independent renaming of the species occurred in 1793 by Marcus Elieser Bloch, who assigned the name Scomber rottleri, with several later redescriptions and namings occurring up until 1874. In 1851 Pieter Bleeker reassigned Scomber rottleri to its own genus Megalaspis, meaning "large scutes". When S. rottleri was found to be a junior synonym of S. cordyla, the name of the species was finally transferred to Megalaspis cordyla where it has remained. M. cordyla has a variety of common names, the most common of which is torpedo scad, with hardtail scad, finny scad, finletted mackerel scad and cordyla scad occasionally used. Because of the wide range of the species, it has a large collection of non-English common names also.

The relationship of the species to other carangids was assessed in Soko Gushiken's 1986 paper on the phylogeny of the Carangidae. It was the sole species in one of three distinct clades within the tribe Carangini. The torpedo scad has not been included in any later genetic phylogenetic studies of the Carangidae.

== Description ==
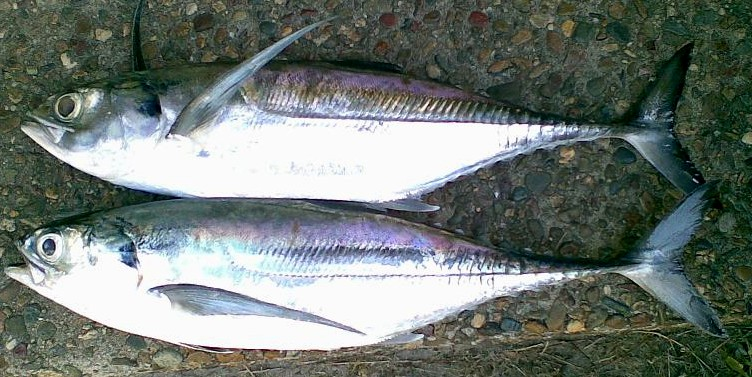
Torpedo scad taken in northern Australia

The torpedo scad is a moderately large fish, growing to a maximum recorded length of 80 cm and a weight of 4 kg, however is more common between 30 and 40 cm length. It is rare at lengths greater than 80 cm. The species is often considered to have a rather unusual body form, having features superficially similar to tunas, mackerels and other carangids. The body is elongate and subcylindrical, becoming highly compressed toward the tail and caudal fin, with a marked median keel on the caudal peduncle. The dorsal and ventral profiles of the fish are nearly evenly convex, with the two profiles intersecting at the pointed snout. There are two separate dorsal fins; the first consisting of 8 moderately high spines and the second of a single spine followed by 18 to 20 soft rays. The anal fin consists of two anteriorally detached spines followed by a single spine attached to 16 or 17 soft rays. In both the dorsal and anal fins, the posterior 7-10 rays are detached and form a series of diagnostic finlets. The pectoral fin is strongly falcate (scythe shaped), and extends beyond the origin of the second dorsal fin. The lateral line is strongly arched over a short length anteriorly, with the intersection of the curved and straight sections vertically below the fourth or fifth spine of the first dorsal fin. The curved section of the lateral line has 21 to 29 scales, while the straight section has 51 to 59 very large scutes. The breast is devoid of scales in a triangular patch to about one-third the distance to the pectoral fin base. The eye has a well-developed adipose eyelid which nearly completely covers the eye. The upper jaw contains small villiform teeth, with some outer teeth moderately enlarged, while the lower jaw has a single row of small teeth. There are 26 to 32 gill rakers and 24 vertebrae.

The olfactory apparatus and hypothalamo-neurosecretory system of the species has been extensively described in the Indian scientific literature. Also of note is a report of a heavily deformed individual from India, which survived past maturity.

The torpedo scad is bluish-grey to green above, changing to a silvery white on its sides and belly. The dorsal and anal fins are pale to yellow, becoming dusky at the outer edges. The pectoral and pelvic fins are also pale with dusky upper halves, while the caudal fin is dark, particularly on the leading and trailing edges. A large black spot is present on the operculum.

== Distribution and habitat ==
The torpedo scad is distributed throughout the tropical and subtropical waters of the Indian and west Pacific Oceans. In the west, the range of the species extends from the tip of South Africa north along the east African coastline to the Persian Gulf and Red Sea. Records of the fish are common from most Indian Ocean islands including the Maldives, Seychelles and Madagascar. The species is found along the Indian and Asian coastlines, extending north to China and South Korea on the mainland. It is abundant through the central Indo-Pacific and the Indonesian Archipelago, with its offshore range extending to Taiwan and Japan in the north. Around Australia, torpedo scad have been recorded as far south as Fremantle on the west coast and Sydney on the east coast. The range of the species extends to several eastern Pacific islands including Samoa, New Caledonia and Tonga.

The torpedo scad is a pelagic schooling species which is found in both far offshore oceanic environments as well as more protected inshore environments. The fish commonly are found in the upper water column near the surface waters. It is not found in estuaries and appears to be intolerant of dirty or turbid waters. The range of the species extends to more southern waters in summer as the warm waters push further down the coasts.

== Biology and ecology ==
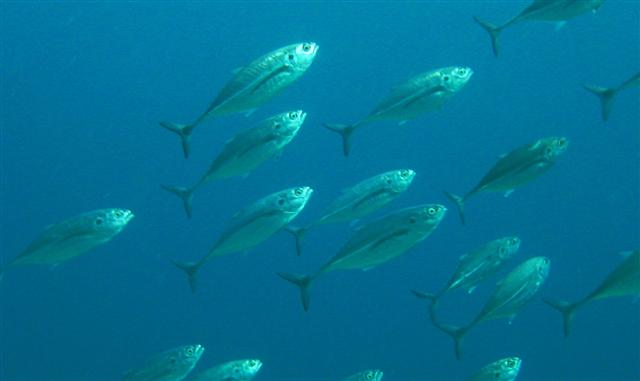
A school of torpedo scad

The torpedo scad is an important species to commercial fisheries in parts of Asia, and as such has had significant research published on its biology and ecology. All of this information is published in relatively obscure Indian journals and is unavailable to most institutions. The torpedo scad is a predatory fish which both consumes larger prey and filter feeds to consume planktonic organisms. Larger prey items include a variety of fish and cephalopods including squid and cuttlefish. Smaller foods are mostly crustaceans such as shrimps, prawns, stomatopods, cladocerans and crabs. Molluscs and gastropods are also reported to be minor constituents of the diet of the species. The species also appears to have dietary shifts as it grows, however in all size classes fish are the dominant prey. Species recorded as being predators of torpedo scad include species of drums and requiem shark. Each sex of the torpedo scad reach sexual maturity at different lengths; females are mature by 22 cm and males by 26.4 cm. Other studies have suggested similar lengths, including 17 cm in males and 27 cm in females, as well as an average of 25 cm in both sexes. Spawning has not been directly observed, however peaks in larval abundance are known from March to July, with a peak in June in India. the eggs are pelagic, and are spherical and transparent with a yolk and single oil globule. The larval stage is extensively described, with the species having 24 myomeres. The growth of the species is not reported, however numerous morphometric (length vs weight) studies have been carried out on the species. The population structure in Indian waters has also been well studied, with the most recent of these suggesting a major recruitment event occurs between May and August. These studies also guide fisheries regulations, with a theoretical maximum yield achieved when fish are only taken once they reach 18 cm.

== Relationship to humans ==
Global capture production of Torpedo scad (Megalaspis cordyla) in thousand tonnes from 1950 to 2022, as reported by the FAO

The torpedo scad is of major importance to commercial fisheries in the central Indo-Pacific region (including India), and of moderate to minor importance elsewhere. Statistics recorded by the FAO do not include India, however even without this country the annual take of torpedo scad has increased from 70,000 tonnes in 1997 to 107,000 tonnes in 2007. On the basis of these statistics, the biggest utiliser of the species is Indonesia, with a take of 42,000 tonnes followed by Malaysia with a take of 22,000 tonnes. Thailand and the Philippines also take large quantities of the fish, with around 18,000 tonnes each annually. Middle Eastern countries also record this species in their hauls, but at lower amounts of between 50 and 5000 t. In more southerly regions such as South Africa, it is a rare catch, usually appearing in beach seines. The species is taken by a variety of netting methods such as beach seines, trawls, purse seines and other types of trap including hook and line. It is usually marketed fresh, dried or salted. Torpedo scad are often caught by recreational fishermen throughout their range, however are not considered a target for gamefishing. They readily take small lures and are good sport on light tackle. Torpedo scad are said to have fair to good quality flesh, however are not very popular. Some chefs recommend frying or steaming the fish, although grilling is also acceptable. In polluted waters it has been demonstrated the fish contain higher than acceptable levels of heavy metals, and should be avoided in such regions. Torpedo scad are often used as live baits for larger gamefish.
