= Cape Belimbing =

Southernmost point of the island of Sumatra, Indonesia

Coordinates: 5°56′35″S 104°35′4″E

Cape Belimbing (Indonesian: Tanjung Belimbing, literally means "cape carambola") is a remote cape located in Bangkunat subdistrict, Pesisir Barat Regency, Lampung, Indonesia. The cape is the southernmost point of Sumatra, facing the Sunda Strait to the southeast and Indian Ocean to the west. The cape is part of Bukit Barisan Selatan National Park, one of national parks located in Sumatra. There is a lighthouse just northwest from the cape. The surrounding waters around the cape is frequently patrolled by the Indonesian Navy to preserve coral reefs sustainability from human destruction.
