= Supiori Regency =

Regency in Papua, Indonesia

Supiori Regency Kabupaten Supiori
- Regency
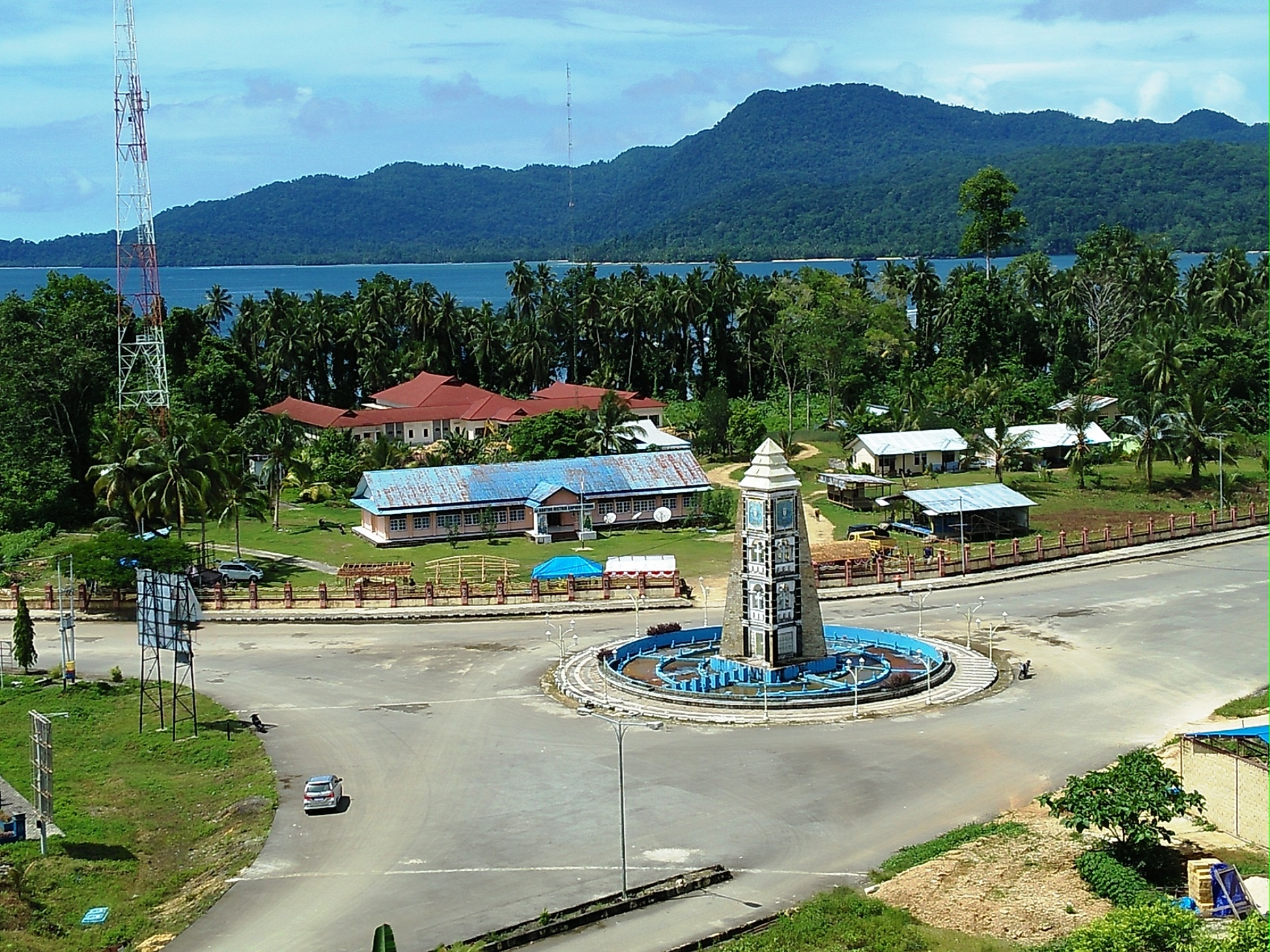
- A monument in Sorendiweri, capital of Supiori

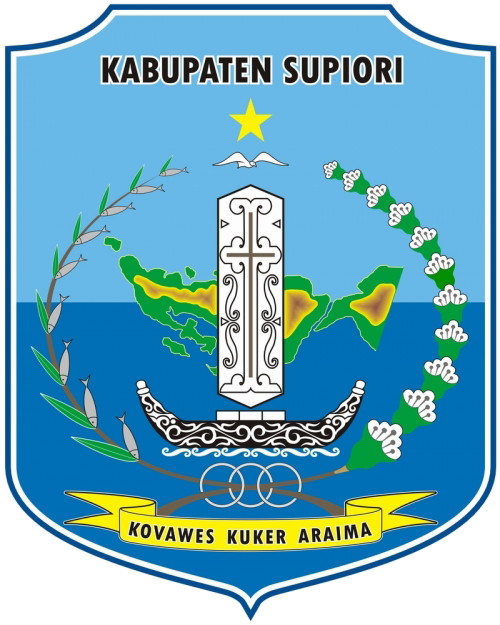
- Coat of arms
- Motto: Kovawes Kuker Araima
- Location in Papua Province

- Location in Indonesian Papua Location in Indonesia
- Coordinates: 0°44′S 135°35′E
- Country: Indonesia
- Province: Papua
- Capital: Sorendiweri

Government
  - Regent: Heronimus Mansoben
  - Vice Regent: Sahrul Hasanudin Nunsi

Area
  - Total: 634.24 km^{2} (244.88 sq mi)

Population (mid 2024 estimate)
  - Total: 24,527
  - Density: 38.671/km^{2} (100.16/sq mi)
- Time zone: UTC+9 (Indonesia Eastern Time)
- Area code: (+62) 981
- Website: supiorikab.go.id

Supiori Regency (Indonesian: Kabupaten Supiori) is a regency in the Indonesian province of Papua. The Regency has an area of 634.24 km^{2} including the Aruri Islands group to the south, and had a population of 15,874 at the 2010 Census and 22,547 at the 2020 Census; the official estimate as of mid-2024 was 24,527 - comprising 12,685 males and 11,842 females. Until 8 January 2004, this area was part of the Biak Numfor Regency, from which it was split off in accordance with the Law (Undang-Undang RI No.35 Tahun 2003) dated 18 December 2003.

== Geography ==
It comprises mainly the island of Supiori, one of the Biak Islands within Cenderawasih Bay off the north coast of Papua province (the rest of the Schouten Islands comprise the separate Biak Numfor Regency); the island is connected to Biak Island by a bridge across the Sorendi River (which is actually a narrow channel separating the two islands). The Supiori Regency also includes the Aruri Islands to the south of Supiori, comprising the small coral islands Aruri (Insumbabi) and Rani Island as well as over a hundred smaller islets. Its West Supiori District also includes Mapia Atoll to the northwest, approximately 290 kilometers north of the city of Manokwari.

== Administrative districts ==
The existing regency comprises five districts (kecamatan), tabulated below with their areas and their populations at the 2010 Census and the 2020 Census, together with the official estimates as of mid-2024. The table also includes the administrative centre of each district, the number of administrative villages (all classed as kampung) and of minor islands within each district, and its post code.

Kode Wilayah	Name of District (distrik)	Area in km^{2}	Pop'n 2010 Census	Pop'n 2020 Census	Pop'n mid 2024 Estimate	Admin centre	No. of villages	No. of islands	Post code
91.19.01	Supiori Selatan (South Supiori)	87.60	2,743	3,329	3,434	Maryaidori	7	15	98572
91.19.04	Kepulauan Aruri (Aruri Islands) ^{(a)}	119.75	4,420	5,499	5,729	Mbruawandi	9	111	98571
91.19.02	Supiori Utara (North Supiori)	79.83	1,644	2,433	2,710	Fanjur	5	2 ^{(b)}	98582
91.19.05	Supiori Barat (West Supiori)	150.80	2,147	2,516	2,614	Waryei	7	31	98581
91.19.03	Supiori Timur (East Supiori)	196.26	4,920	8,770	10,040	Sorendidori	10	9	98573
	Totals	634.24	15,874	22,547	24,527		38	168	

Notes: (a) includes the southwestern portion of Supiori Island, as well as the 111 minor islands. (b) the offshore islands of Pulau Ayami and Pulau Miosfuar.

== Climate ==
Sorendiweri, the seat of the regency has a tropical rainforest climate (Af) with heavy rainfall year-round.

Climate data for Sorendiweri
Month	Jan	Feb	Mar	Apr	May	Jun	Jul	Aug	Sep	Oct	Nov	Dec	Year
Mean daily maximum °C (°F)	30.6 (87.1)	30.4 (86.7)	30.4 (86.7)	30.8 (87.4)	30.9 (87.6)	30.5 (86.9)	30.2 (86.4)	30.3 (86.5)	30.7 (87.3)	31.0 (87.8)	30.9 (87.6)	30.7 (87.3)	30.6 (87.1)
Daily mean °C (°F)	26.9 (80.4)	26.8 (80.2)	26.8 (80.2)	27.1 (80.8)	27.1 (80.8)	26.8 (80.2)	26.6 (79.9)	26.5 (79.7)	26.8 (80.2)	27.0 (80.6)	27.1 (80.8)	26.9 (80.4)	26.9 (80.4)
Mean daily minimum °C (°F)	23.2 (73.8)	23.2 (73.8)	23.3 (73.9)	23.4 (74.1)	23.4 (74.1)	23.2 (73.8)	23.0 (73.4)	22.8 (73.0)	22.9 (73.2)	23.1 (73.6)	23.3 (73.9)	23.2 (73.8)	23.2 (73.7)
Average rainfall mm (inches)	244 (9.6)	229 (9.0)	244 (9.6)	214 (8.4)	224 (8.8)	211 (8.3)	223 (8.8)	207 (8.1)	192 (7.6)	165 (6.5)	174 (6.9)	223 (8.8)	2,550 (100.4)
Source: Climate-Data.org
