= Lumbis Ogong =

- District
- Interactive map of Lumbis Ogong
- Country: Indonesia
- Province: North Kalimantan
- Regency: Nunukan Regency

Lumbis Ogong is one of the districts in Nunukan Regency, North Kalimantan Province, Indonesia. This district is located in the northern part of Nunukan Regency and borders directly with Malaysia to the north.

== Geography ==
Geographically, Lumbis Ogong generally consists of mountainous areas and forests, which are part of the Kalimantan tropical rainforest ecosystem. The population in this area is mostly Dayak and other tribes who have long settled in the area.

== Economy ==
The economy of the people in this sub-district generally depends on agriculture, fisheries, and local trade. Infrastructure and accessibility to Lumbis Ogong are still challenges, but efforts continue to be made to improve the welfare and development of this area.
