= Point Batee =

Coastal point in Aceh Besar Regency, Indonesia

Coordinates: 5.656635°N 95.432332°E

Point Batee (Indonesian: Ujung Batee), historically known as Point Baka (Indonesian: Ujung Baka), Point Pedro or Pedropunt, is a beach and cape located in Mesjid Raya District, Aceh Besar Regency, Aceh, Indonesia. This beach is located approximately 20 kilometers northeast of Banda Aceh. This beach is the northernmost point of Sumatra.
