= Circles of latitude between the Equator and the 5th parallel north =

Circles of latitude

Following are whole degree circles of latitude between the Equator and the 5th parallel north:

== 1st parallel north ==
1st parallel north (interactive map)

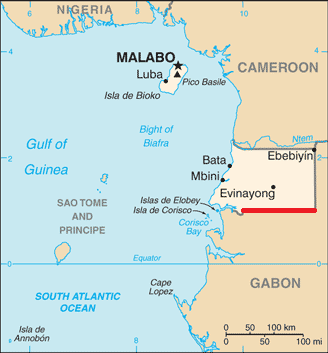
The 1st parallel north defines most of Equatorial Guinea's southern border with Gabon.

The 1st parallel north is a circle of latitude that is 1 degree north of the Earth's equatorial plane. It crosses the Atlantic Ocean, Africa, the Indian Ocean, Southeast Asia, the Pacific Ocean, and South America.

The parallel defines part of the border between Equatorial Guinea and Gabon.

=== Around the world ===
Starting at the Prime Meridian, and heading eastwards, the parallel 1° north passes through:

Coordinates	Country, territory or sea	Notes
1°0′N 0°0′E	Atlantic Ocean	Passing just north of the island of Corisco, Equatorial Guinea; Passing just north of the island of Elobey Grande, Equatorial Guinea
1°0′N 9°31′E	Equatorial Guinea	Island of Elobey Chico
1°0′N 9°31′E	Atlantic Ocean	
1°0′N 9°35′E	Gabon	
1°0′N 9°47′E	Equatorial Guinea	
1°0′N 10°0′E	Equatorial Guinea / Gabon border	
1°0′N 11°20′E	Gabon	
1°0′N 14°25′E	Republic of the Congo	
1°0′N 17°51′E	Democratic Republic of the Congo	
1°0′N 30°13′E	Uganda	
1°0′N 34°29′E	Kenya	
1°0′N 41°0′E	Somalia	
1°0′N 43°54′E	Indian Ocean	Passing just north of Huvadhu Atoll, Maldives
1°0′N 97°23′E	Indonesia	Island of Nias
1°0′N 97°55′E	Indian Ocean	
1°0′N 98°56′E	Indonesia	Islands of Sumatra, Padang, Rantau and Rangsang
1°0′N 103°4′E	Strait of Malacca	
1°0′N 103°21′E	Indonesia	Island of Great Karimun
1°0′N 103°27′E	Singapore Strait	
1°0′N 103°47′E	Indonesia	Islands including Kapaladjernih, Bulan, Batam, Bintan and Mapur
1°0′N 104°51′E	South China Sea	
1°0′N 107°23′E	Indonesia	Tambelan archipelago
1°0′N 107°36′E	South China Sea	
1°0′N 108°58′E	Indonesia	West Kalimantan
1°0′N 110°16′E	Malaysia	Sarawak - for about 3 km
1°0′N 110°18′E	Indonesia	West Kalimantan - for about 4 km
1°0′N 110°20′E	Malaysia	Sarawak
1°0′N 110°53′E	Indonesia	West Kalimantan
1°0′N 111°31′E	Malaysia	Sarawak - for about 8 km
1°0′N 111°35′E	Indonesia	West Kalimantan
1°0′N 110°46′E	Malaysia	Sarawak - for about 8 km
1°0′N 111°51′E	Indonesia	West Kalimantan; East Kalimantan
1°0′N 118°59′E	Makassar Strait	
1°0′N 120°44′E	Indonesia	Island of Sulawesi
1°0′N 122°28′E	Celebes Sea	
1°0′N 124°14′E	Indonesia	Island of Sulawesi
1°0′N 124°54′E	Molucca Sea	Passing just north of the island of Gureda, Indonesia
1°0′N 127°28′E	Indonesia	Island of Halmahera
1°0′N 127°38′E	Kao Bay	
1°0′N 127°56′E	Indonesia	Island of Halmahera
1°0′N 128°33′E	Pacific Ocean	Passing just south of the island of Fani, Indonesia; Passing just north of the Mapia Islands, Indonesia; Passing just south of Kapingamarangi atoll, Federated States of Micronesia
1°0′N 173°0′E	Kiribati	Maiana atoll
1°0′N 173°3′E	Pacific Ocean	Passing just north of Howland Island, United States Minor Outlying Islands; Passing between Wolf Island and Pinta Island in the Galápagos Islands, Ecuador
1°0′N 79°31′W	Ecuador	Passing just north of Esmeraldas
1°0′N 78°13′W	Colombia	
1°0′N 69°13′W	Brazil	Amazonas
1°0′N 66°36′W	Venezuela	
1°0′N 65°41′W	Brazil	Amazonas - for about 11 km
1°0′N 65°36′W	Venezuela	
1°0′N 65°10′W	Brazil	Amazonas; Roraima; Pará; Amapá; Pará - an island in the mouth of the Amazon River
1°0′N 49°56′W	Atlantic Ocean	

== 2nd parallel north ==
2nd parallel north (interactive map)

The 2nd parallel north is a circle of latitude that is 2 degrees north of the Earth's equatorial plane. It crosses the Atlantic Ocean, Africa, the Indian Ocean, Southeast Asia, the Pacific Ocean, and South America.

=== Around the world ===
Starting at the Prime Meridian and heading eastwards, the parallel 2° north passes through:

Coordinates	Country, territory or sea	Notes
2°0′N 0°0′E	Atlantic Ocean	Gulf of Guinea
2°0′N 9°47′E	Equatorial Guinea	
2°0′N 11°20′E	Gabon	
2°0′N 13°14′E	Republic of the Congo	
2°0′N 15°2′E	Cameroon	For about 9 km
2°0′N 15°7′E	Republic of the Congo	For about 17 km
2°0′N 15°16′E	Cameroon	
2°0′N 16°3′E	Republic of the Congo	
2°0′N 18°5′E	Democratic Republic of the Congo	
2°0′N 31°3′E	Lake Albert	The border with Uganda is in the lake at 2°0′N 31°14′E
2°0′N 31°24′E	Uganda	
2°0′N 34°59′E	Kenya	
2°0′N 41°0′E	Somalia	
2°0′N 45°17′E	Indian Ocean	Passing just south of Mogadishu, Somalia
2°0′N 73°21′E	Maldives	Laamu Atoll
2°0′N 73°33′E	Indian Ocean	Passing just south of the Banyak Islands, Indonesia
2°0′N 98°27′E	Indonesia	Islands of Sumatra and Rupat
2°0′N 101°46′E	Strait of Malacca	
2°0′N 102°35′E	Malaysia	Johor
2°0′N 104°6′E	South China Sea	
2°0′N 109°35′E	Indonesia	island of Borneo; West Kalimantan – for about 3 km
2°0′N 109°37′E	Malaysia	Sarawak – for about 3 km
2°0′N 109°39′E	South China Sea	
2°0′N 111°10′E	Malaysia	island of Borneo; Sarawak
2°0′N 114°52′E	Indonesia	North Kalimantan; East Kalimantan
2°0′N 117°50′E	Celebes Sea	
2°0′N 125°17′E	Molucca Sea	Passing just south of the island of Biaro, Indonesia
2°0′N 127°46′E	Indonesia	Island of Halmahera
2°0′N 127°57′E	Pacific Ocean	
2°0′N 128°16′E	Indonesia	Island of Morotai – for about 1 km
2°0′N 128°17′E	Pacific Ocean	Passing just north of Abaiang atoll, Kiribati
2°0′N 173°15′E	Kiribati	Marakei atoll
2°0′N 173°18′E	Pacific Ocean	
2°0′N 157°47′W	Kiribati	Kiritimati atoll
2°0′N 157°40′W	Pacific Ocean	
2°0′N 78°39′W	Colombia	
2°0′N 68°13′W	Brazil	Amazonas – for about 3 km
2°0′N 68°11′W	Colombia	
2°0′N 67°39′W	Brazil	Amazonas
2°0′N 67°18′W	Colombia	
2°0′N 67°7′W	Venezuela	
2°0′N 63°46′W	Brazil	Amazonas; Roraima
2°0′N 59°44′W	Disputed area	Controlled by Guyana, claimed by Venezuela
2°0′N 58°28′W	Guyana	
2°0′N 57°55′W	Disputed area	Controlled by Guyana, claimed by Suriname
2°0′N 57°9′W	Brazil	Pará – for about 8 km
2°0′N 57°4′W	Disputed area	Controlled by Guyana, claimed by Suriname
2°0′N 56°38′W	Suriname	
2°0′N 55°55′W	Brazil	Pará; Amapá – mainland and the island of Maracá
2°0′N 50°17′W	Atlantic Ocean	

== 3rd parallel north ==
3rd parallel north (interactive map)

The 3rd parallel north is a circle of latitude that is 3 degrees north of the Earth's equatorial plane. It crosses the Atlantic Ocean, Africa, the Indian Ocean, Southeast Asia, the Pacific Ocean, and South America.

=== Around the world ===
Starting at the Prime Meridian and heading eastwards, the parallel 3° north passes through:

Coordinates	Country, territory or sea	Notes
3°0′N 0°0′E	Atlantic Ocean	Gulf of Guinea – passing just south of Bioko island, Equatorial Guinea
3°0′N 9°56′E	Cameroon	
3°0′N 12°57′E	Central African Republic	For about 2km
3°0′N 15°59′E	Cameroon	For about 3km
3°0′N 16°0′E	Central African Republic	
3°0′N 16°30′E	Republic of the Congo	
3°0′N 18°30′E	Democratic Republic of the Congo	
3°0′N 30°49′E	Uganda	
3°0′N 34°35′E	Kenya	Passing through Lake Turkana
3°0′N 41°10′E	Somalia	
3°0′N 46°36′E	Indian Ocean	
3°0′N 73°28′E	Maldives	Meemu Atoll
3°0′N 73°33′E	Indian Ocean	Passing just north of the island of Simeulue, Indonesia
3°0′N 97°22′E	Indonesia	Island of Sumatra
3°0′N 99°54′E	Strait of Malacca	
3°0′N 101°14′E	Malaysia	Selangor, Negeri Sembilan and Pahang, on Peninsular Malaysia
3°0′N 103°26′E	South China Sea	Passing just north of the island of Tioman, Malaysia
3°0′N 105°41′E	Indonesia	Island of Jemaja
3°0′N 105°44′E	South China Sea	
3°0′N 107°45′E	Indonesia	Island of Midai
3°0′N 107°48′E	South China Sea	
3°0′N 108°50′E	Indonesia	Island of Subi
3°0′N 108°53′E	South China Sea	
3°0′N 112°26′E	Malaysia	Sarawak, island of Borneo
3°0′N 115°15′E	Indonesia	North Kalimantan, island of Borneo – for about 8km
3°0′N 115°19′E	Malaysia	Sarawak, island of Borneo – for about 10km
3°0′N 115°25′E	Indonesia	North Kalimantan, island of Borneo
3°0′N 117°35′E	Celebes Sea	
3°0′N 125°30′E	Molucca Sea	
3°0′N 128°13′E	Pacific Ocean	Passing just south of Butaritari atoll, Kiribati
3°0′N 78°11′W	Colombia	Island of Gorgona island, and mainland
3°0′N 78°10′W	Pacific Ocean	
3°0′N 77°41′W	Colombia	
3°0′N 67°42′W	Venezuela	
3°0′N 64°8′W	Brazil	Roraima
3°0′N 59°57′W	Disputed area	Controlled by Guyana, claimed by Venezuela
3°0′N 58°9′W	Guyana	
3°0′N 57°30′W	Disputed area	Controlled by Guyana, claimed by Suriname
3°0′N 57°12′W	Suriname	
3°0′N 54°11′W	Disputed area	Controlled by France, claimed by Suriname
3°0′N 53°59′W	France	French Guiana
3°0′N 52°22′W	Brazil	Amapá
3°0′N 50°57′W	Atlantic Ocean	

== 4th parallel north ==
4th parallel north (interactive map)

The 4th parallel north is a circle of latitude that is 4 degrees north of the Earth's equatorial plane. It crosses the Atlantic Ocean, Africa, the Indian Ocean, Southeast Asia, the Pacific Ocean, and South America.

=== Around the world ===
Starting at the Prime Meridian and heading eastwards, the parallel 4° north passes through:

Coordinates	Country, territory or sea	Notes
4°0′N 0°0′E	Atlantic Ocean	Gulf of Guinea – passing just north of Bioko island, Equatorial Guinea
4°0′N 9°13′E	Cameroon	Passing just south of Douala
4°0′N 15°3′E	Central African Republic	
4°0′N 18°39′E	Democratic Republic of the Congo	
4°0′N 30°12′E	South Sudan	
4°0′N 33°46′E	Uganda	
4°0′N 34°4′E	Kenya	Passing through Lake Turkana
4°0′N 37°35′E	Ethiopia	
4°0′N 40°7′E	Kenya	
4°0′N 41°6′E	Ethiopia	
4°0′N 41°55′E	Somalia	
4°0′N 47°32′E	Indian Ocean	
4°0′N 72°41′E	Maldives	Ari Atoll
4°0′N 72°56′E	Indian Ocean	
4°0′N 73°21′E	Maldives	Malé Atoll
4°0′N 73°30′E	Indian Ocean	
4°0′N 96°17′E	Indonesia	Island of Sumatra
4°0′N 98°32′E	Strait of Malacca	
4°0′N 100°43′E	Malaysia	Perak, Pahang, Terengganu and Pahang again, on Peninsular Malaysia
4°0′N 103°25′E	South China Sea	
4°0′N 107°59′E	Indonesia	Island of Natuna Besar
4°0′N 108°21′E	South China Sea	
4°0′N 113°43′E	Malaysia	Sarawak, island of Borneo
4°0′N 115°39′E	Indonesia	North Kalimantan, islands of Borneo and Nunukan
4°0′N 117°43′E	Celebes Sea	
4°0′N 126°37′E	Indonesia	Talaud Islands
4°0′N 126°47′E	Pacific Ocean	Passing just south of Merir island, Palau; Passing just north of Nukuoro atoll, Federated States of Micronesia; Passing just north of Tabuaeran atoll, Kiribati; Passing just north of Malpelo island, Colombia
4°0′N 77°25′W	Colombia	
4°0′N 67°42′W	Venezuela	
4°0′N 64°39′W	Brazil	Roraima
4°0′N 64°4′W	Venezuela	
4°0′N 62°45′W	Brazil	Roraima
4°0′N 59°35′W	Disputed area	Controlled by Guyana, claimed by Venezuela
4°0′N 58°26′W	Guyana	
4°0′N 58°2′W	Suriname	
4°0′N 54°18′W	France	French Guiana
4°0′N 51°45′W	Brazil	Amapá
4°0′N 51°10′W	Atlantic Ocean	Passing just south of Cape Palmas, Liberia

== 5th parallel north ==
5th parallel north (interactive map)

The 5th parallel north is a circle of latitude that is 5 degrees north of the Earth's equatorial plane. It crosses the Atlantic Ocean, Africa, the Indian Ocean, Southeast Asia, the Pacific Ocean, and South America.

The Pacific Ocean is at its widest (approximately 19,300 km) on this parallel.

=== Around the world ===
Starting at the Prime Meridian and heading eastwards, the parallel 5° north passes through:

Coordinates	Country, territory or sea	Notes
5°0′N 0°0′E	Atlantic Ocean	Bight of Benin
5°0′N 5°26′E	Nigeria	
5°0′N 8°41′E	Cameroon	
5°0′N 14°41′E	Central African Republic	
5°0′N 19°14′E	Democratic Republic of the Congo	
5°0′N 19°53′E	Central African Republic	
5°0′N 24°18′E	Democratic Republic of the Congo	
5°0′N 24°38′E	Central African Republic	
5°0′N 25°8′E	Democratic Republic of the Congo	
5°0′N 27°29′E	South Sudan	
5°0′N 35°21′E	Ilemi Triangle	Disputed territory, controlled by Kenya and claimed by South Sudan
5°0′N 35°25′E	South Sudan	
5°0′N 35°49′E	Ethiopia	
5°0′N 45°3′E	Somalia	
5°0′N 48°16′E	Indian Ocean	Passing between Southern Maalhosmadulhu Atoll and Horsburgh Atoll, Maldives; Passing just north of the island of Kaashidhoo, Maldives
5°0′N 95°21′E	Indonesia	Island of Sumatra
5°0′N 97°44′E	Strait of Malacca	
5°0′N 100°29′E	Malaysia	Perak, Kelantan, Terengganu, on Peninsular Malaysia
5°0′N 103°19′E	South China Sea	
5°0′N 114°55′E	Brunei	On the island of Borneo, near Bandar Seri Begawan
5°0′N 115°7′E	Brunei Bay	
5°0′N 115°27′E	Malaysia	Sabah, island of Borneo
5°0′N 118°52′E	Celebes Sea	Passing north of the Sibutu islands, Philippines; Passing between the islands of Bongao and Simunul, Philippines
5°0′N 120°0′E	Philippines	Island of Bilatan
5°0′N 120°1′E	Celebes Sea	Passing just south of the islands of Banaran and Mantabuan, Philippines
5°0′N 125°23′E	Pacific Ocean	Passing between the islands of Sonsorol and Pulo Anna, Palau; Passing just south of Satawan and Kosrae atolls, Federated States of Micronesia; Passing between Namdrik and Ebon atolls, Marshall Islands; Passing just north of Teraina atoll, Kiribati; Passing just south of Cocos Island, Costa Rica
5°0′N 77°22′W	Colombia	
5°0′N 67°48′W	Venezuela	
5°0′N 60°35′W	Brazil	Roraima
5°0′N 59°59′W	Disputed area	Controlled by Guyana, claimed by Venezuela
5°0′N 58°50′W	Guyana	
5°0′N 57°42′W	Suriname	For about 7 km
5°0′N 57°38′W	Guyana	For about 6 km
5°0′N 57°34′W	Suriname	For about 8 km
5°0′N 57°30′W	Guyana	For about 12 km
5°0′N 57°24′W	Suriname	
5°0′N 54°26′W	French Guiana	Overseas department of France
5°0′N 52°25′W	Atlantic Ocean	
5°0′N 9°2′W	Liberia	
5°0′N 7°32′W	Ivory Coast	
5°0′N 5°56′W	Atlantic Ocean	Gulf of Guinea
5°0′N 2°40′W	Ghana	
5°0′N 1°38′W	Atlantic Ocean	Bight of Benin

== See also ==
- Equator
- Circles of latitude between the Equator and the 5th parallel south
- Circles of latitude between the 5th parallel north and the 10th parallel north
