= 2023 Serasan landslide =

2023 landslide in Indonesia

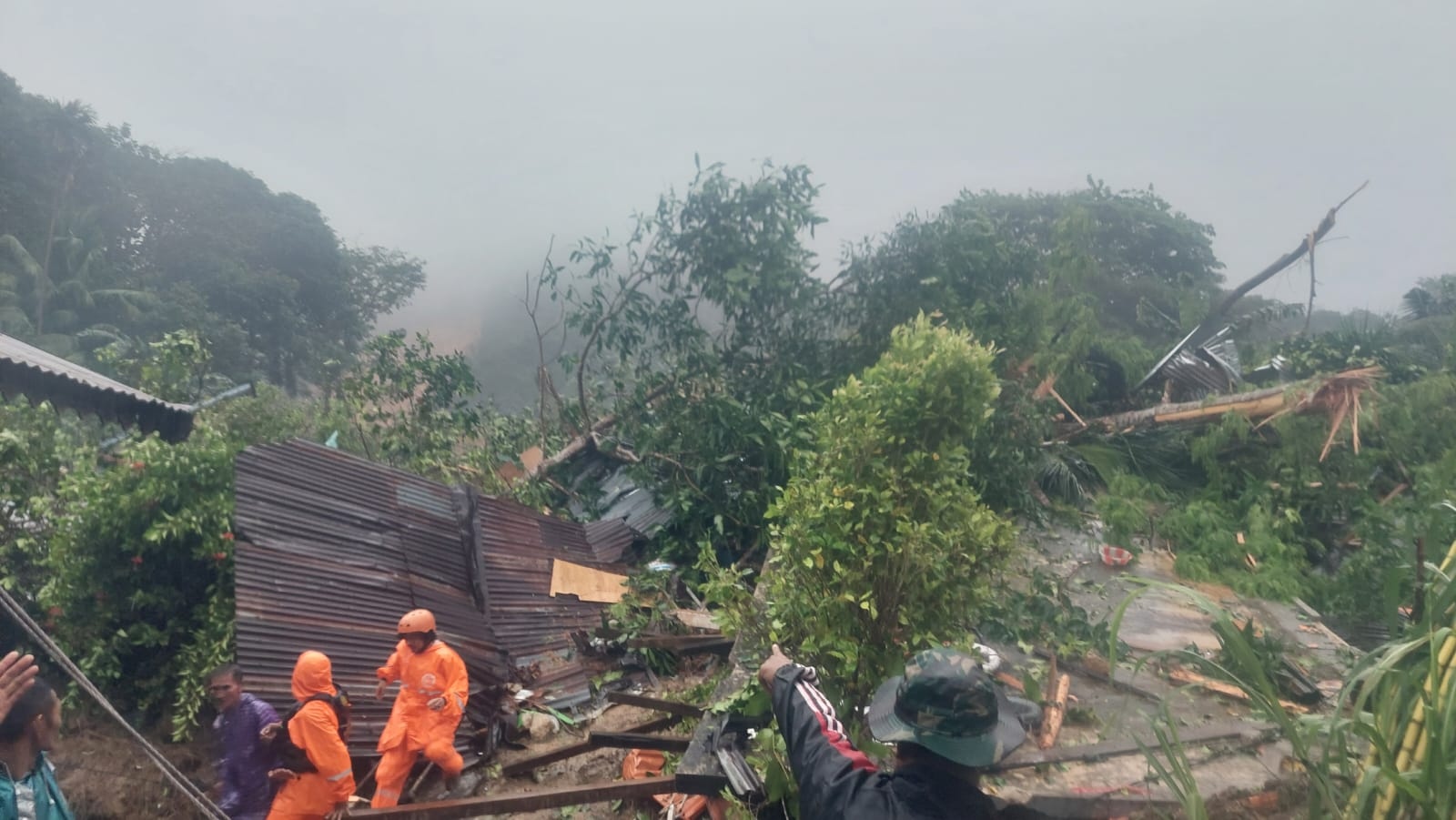
- Aftermath of the Serasan landslide
- Date: March 6, 2023
- Time: 11:00 WIB
- Location: Serasan Island, Natuna Regency, Riau Islands, Indonesia; 2.5119°N 109.0389°E
- Cause: Heavy rains
- Deaths: 50
- Missing: 4

On 6 March 2023, a series of landslides were triggered by continuous rain in Serasan Island of Serasan District, Natuna Regency, Riau Islands, Indonesia. Around 50 people were killed and four others were missing while contact to the Serasan Island was entirely lost. An entire village was reportedly buried.

== Aftermath ==
Riau Islands provincial government dispatched 25 police personnel to the island for initial relief efforts. Regional Disaster Mitigation Agency of Natuna Regency and 318th Natuna Military District also dispatched two ships. The relief effort was hampered because of the heavy rains, which forced the search efforts to halt on several occasions, and the islands' remote location, which normally took five hours to get to by boat during calm weather from the capital of the regency, Ranai. A search and rescue team was dispatched from Ranai with a total of 36 people. The landslides resulted in total blackout of electricity and telecommunications to the island, making contact with the outside world difficult. The landslides also damaged major roads across the island.

== Emergency assistance ==
The Indonesia National Disaster Management Agency provided logistical assistance and equipment to accelerate landslide emergency handling. The assistance was in the form of ready-to-use funds worth 1 billion rupiah for emergency handling and meeting the basic needs of refugees, four refugee tents, 100 family tents, 500 blankets, 500 mattresses, 15 2 kVA electric generators, 1,500 food packages, 1,500 rendang packages, 200 velbeds, and 100 salt lamps. The four evacuation points were spread across the PLBN refugee camp, which accommodates 219 people; the Serasah Community Health Center refugee camp, which accommodates 215 people; the Pelimpak and Al Furqon Mosque refugee camps, which accommodate 500 people; and the Serasan High School refugee camp, which accommodates 282 people. As of March 14 2023, around 2835 affected people had to evacuate to refugee camps

== See also ==
- Weather in 2023
- Climate of Indonesia
- 2024 Sulawesi landslide
