= Bunguran Islands =

Archipelago in Riau Islands, Indonesia

Coordinates: 4.0000°N 108.2500°E

Location of Bunguran Islands in Riau Islands Province

The Bunguran Islands are an archipelago in Riau Islands province, Indonesia, located in the Natuna Sea, the southern portion of the South China Sea. The archipelago forms the central part of the Natuna Regency, an archipelago of 272 islands in total, which is in turn included in the Tudjuh Archipelago, off the northwest coast of Borneo. The largest island of the archipelago is Bunguran or Pulau Natuna Besar (Great Natuna Island), situated in the Middle Natuna Archipelago. The group covers a land area of 1,698.6 km^{2} and had a population of 52,013 at the 2010 Census. It is divided into nine districts (kecamatan) – seven of which are tabulated below from north to south with their areas and 2010 Census populations, plus the number of administrative villages within that district (after the creation of two additional districts since 2010) and the postcode:

Name	English name	Area in km^{2}	Population (2010 Census)	No. of Villages	Post Code
Bunguran Utara	(North Bunguran)	402.6	3,817	8	29775
Bunguran Timur Laut	(Northeast Bunguran)	233.9	4,306	7	29776
Bunguran Tengah	(Central Bunguran)	171.9	2,834	3	29778
Bunguran Timur	(East Bunguran)	145.8	22,800	6	29777
Bunguran Barat	(West Bunguran)	444.8	10,893	5	29782
Bunguran Selatan	(South Bunguran)	232.1	2,537	4	29783
Pulau Tiga	(Tiga Island)	67.5	4,826	6	29788

Two additional districts have been created since 2010 out of the existing districts - Bunguran Batubi (split from Bunguran Barat district) and Pulau Tiga Barat (split from Pulau Tiga district).
