= Batu Ampar, Batam =

Batu Ampar
- District
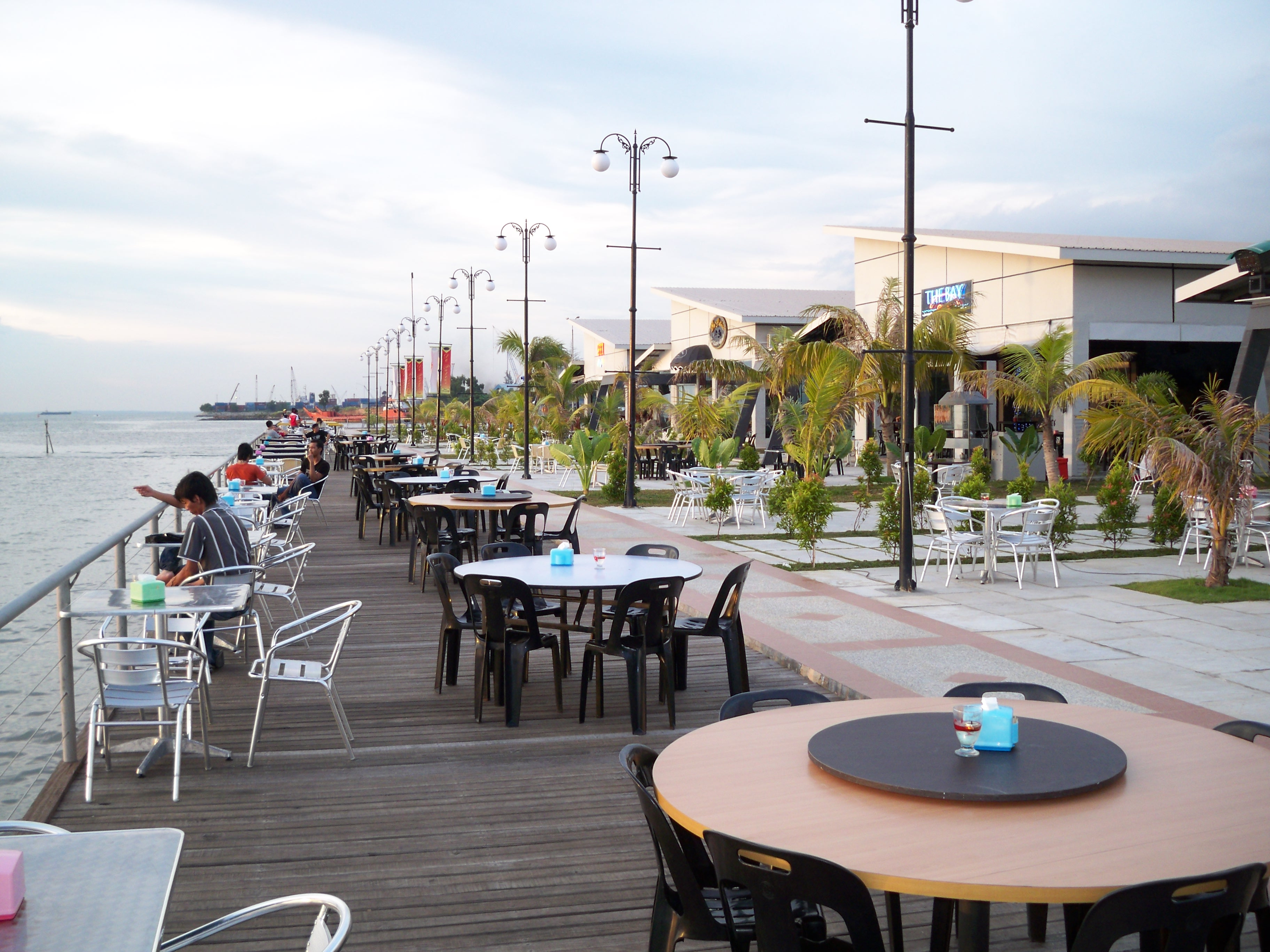
- Harbour Bay's cafes Area, Batu Ampar
- Interactive map of Batu Ampar
- Location within Riau Islands Location within Sumatra Location within Indonesia
- Coordinates: 1°9′42″N 104°0′17″E
- Country: Indonesia
- Province: Riau Islands
- City: City of Batam

Area
  - Total: 40.00 km^{2} (15.44 sq mi)

Population (2020)
  - Total: 60,450
  - Density: 1,511/km^{2} (3,914/sq mi)

Batu Ampar is a district (kecamatan) in Batam City, Riau Islands Province, Indonesia. This district borders directly with the Strait of Malacca and the neighboring country, Singapore.

Batu Ampar is one of the 12 districts in Batam City, Riau Islands. As of 2020, it had a population of 60,450 and a total area of 40 square kilometres (15 sq mi). The district regional capital is located in Sungai Jodoh. Batu Ampar is also known for its infrastructure and industrial development in Batam.

== Governance ==
=== Villages ===
Batu Ampar consists of four urban village (kelurahan):

- Batu Merah
- Kampung Seraya
- Sungai Jodoh
- Tanjung Sengkuang
