= Ranai-Natuna Airport =

Indonesian domestic aerodrome in the Riau Islands

Ranai-Natuna Airport Bandar Udara Ranai-Natuna
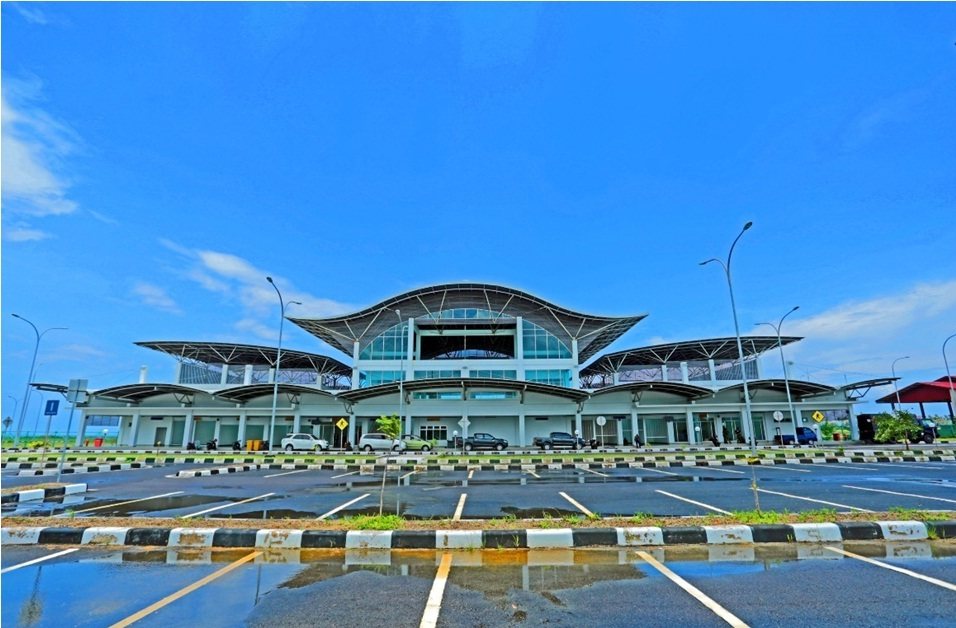
- IATA: NTX; ICAO: WIDO

Summary
- Airport type: Civil/military
- Owner: Government of Indonesia
- Operator: Ministry of Transportation; Indonesian Air Force
- Serves: Ranai Kota, Natuna Regency
- Location: Ranai Kota, Great Natuna, Riau Islands, Indonesia
- Time zone: WIB (UTC+07:00)
- Elevation AMSL: 7 ft / 2 m
- Coordinates: 03°54′31.37″N 108°23′16.43″E

Map
- Location in South China Sea Location in Riau Islands

Runways
Direction	Length		Surface
Direction	m	ft	Surface
18/36	2,560	8,399	Asphalt
- Sources: World Airport Codes ; Indonesian Ministry of Transportation

Ranai-Natuna Airport (IATA: NTX, ICAO: WIDO) or Natuna-Ranai Airport, formerly Raden Sadjad Airport (IATA: NTX, ICAO: WION), is located in Ranai Kota, the capital city of Natuna Regency, on the Natuna archipelago in the Natuna Sea. The airport is also a Type B airbase of the Indonesian Air Force. The airport also serves civilian flights.

Due to the ongoing South China Sea dispute, the Indonesian government has decided to expand the airport to accommodate large military aircraft. Additional facilities, such as aircraft hangars, ILS, refueling hangar are also currently being added. More military personnel are also stationed. The government are also planning to lengthen the airport's runway from 2.560 m to 3.000 m to accommodate large military aircraft. This would act as a deterrent against foreign ships from entering Indonesian waters. The expansion of the airbase is also to prevent illegal foreign fishing boats from entering Indonesian waters. Many fishing boats from China, Vietnam, Malaysia have often entered Indonesian waters illegally.

A new passenger terminal was inaugurated on 6 October 2016. It was inaugurated by President Joko Widodo.

== Facilities ==
The airport resides at an elevation of 2 metres (6 ft 7 in) above mean sea level. It has one runway designated 18/36 with an asphalt surface measuring 2,560 m x 32 m (8,399 ft × 105 ft). The runway is planned to be widened to 45 m in the future. Moreover, the airport has an apron measuring 120 m x 60 m and a taxiway measuring 50 m x 32 m.

The recently built terminal at the airport has an area of 3,868 m², many times larger than the old terminal which only has an area of 243 m². The new terminal can accommodate around 385 passengers daily. The parking lot has been expanded to 5.020 m² and can now cater to around 154 cars and 32 motorcycles. Other facilities inside the airport are the Aviation Accidents Rescue and Fire Fighting building, generator and pump house.

== Airlines and destinations ==
Airlines	Destinations
NAM Air	Batam
Susi Air	Letung
Wings Air	Batam

== Statistics ==
Frequency of flights at Ranai Airport
Rank	Destinations	Frequency (weekly)	Airline(s)
1	Batam, Riau Islands	14	NAM Air, Wings Air
