= List of districts of the Riau Islands =

The province of the Riau Islands in Indonesia is divided into regencies which in turn are divided administratively into districts or kecamatan.

The districts of the Riau Islands with the regency it falls into are as follows:

- Batam Kota (Batam City), Batam City
- Batu Aji (Aji Stone), Batam City
- Batu Ampar (Ampar Stone), Batam City
- Belakang Padang, Batam City
- Bengkong, Batam City
- Bintan Pesisir (Coast Bintan), Bintan
- Bintan Timur (East Bintan), Bintan
- Bintan Utara (North Bintan), Bintan
- Bukit Bestari (Bestari Hill), Tanjung Pinang City
- Bulang, Batam City
- Bunguran Barat (West Bunguran), Natuna
- Bunguran Selatan (South Bunguran), Natuna
- Bunguran Tengah (Central Bunguran), Natuna
- Bunguran Timur (East Bunguran), Natuna
- Bunguran Timur Laut (Northeast Bunguran), Natuna
- Bunguran Utara (North Bunguran), Natuna
- Buru, Karimun
- Durai, Karimun
- Galang, Batam City
- Gunung Kijang (Deer Mountain), Bintan
- Jemaja, Anambas Islands Regency
- Jemaja Timur (East Jemaja), Anambas Islands Regency
- Karimun, Karimun
- Kundur, Karimun
- Kundur Barat (West Kundur), Karimun
- Kundur Utara (North Kundur), Karimun
- Lingga, Lingga
- Lingga Utara (North Lingga), Lingga
- Lubuk Baja, Batam City
- Mantang, Bintan
- Meral, Karimun
- Midai, Natuna
- Moro, Karimun
- Nongsa, Batam City
- Palmatak, Anambas Islands Regency
- Pulau Laut (Sea Island), Natuna
- Pulau Tiga (Three Island), Natuna
- Sagulung, Batam City
- Sekupang, Batam City
- Senayang, Lingga
- Serasan, Natuna
- Serasan Timur (East Serasan), Natuna
- Seri Kuala Lobam, Bintan
- Siantan, Anambas Islands Regency
- Siantan Selatan (South Siantan), Anambas Islands Regency
- Siantan Timur (East Siantan), Anambas Islands Regency
- Singkep, Lingga
- Singkep Barat (West Singkep), Lingga
- Subi, Natuna
- Sungai Beduk (Beduk River), Batam City
- Tambelan, Bintan
- Tanjung Pinang Barat (West Tanjung Pinang), Tanjung Pinang City
- Tanjung Pinang Kota (Tanjung Pinang City), Tanjung Pinang City
- Tanjung Pinang Timur (East Tanjung Pinang), Tanjung Pinang City
- Tebing (Canyon), Karimun
- Teluk Bintan (Bintan Bay), Bintan
- Teluk Sebong (Sebong Bay), Bintan
