= Datok =

Island in West Kalimantan Province, Indonesia

- Interactive map of Datok

Geography
- Location: Natuna Sea
- Coordinates: 1°16′03.95″S 109°56′59.02″E
- Adjacent to: Natuna Sea
- Area: 0.18 km^{2} (0.069 sq mi)

Administration
- Indonesia
- Province: West Kalimantan
- Regency: North Kayong
- District: Sukadana

Datok is a small island in North Kayong Regency, West Kalimantan, Indonesia, located in the Karimata Strait area.

== Description ==
The island is an important location for the 2016 Karimata Strait Sail event, an international event aimed at highlighting the marine riches of the Karimata Strait region. The event includes various activities, such as sailing, marine seminars, and cultural arts performances designed to introduce local marine potential while raising awareness of the importance of sustainable maritime resource management.

Administratively, Datok Island is part of the North Kayong region, which has water characteristics with many other small islands. The island may be inhabited by a small community, or at least used as a place for certain activities such as fishing, marine surveillance, or research activities. Its location close to the mainland makes it easy to reach from Sukadana, the capital of Kayong Utara Regency. Access to the island is usually done by sea using a small boat from the Sukadana coast. The relatively close distance allows for a short trip to reach the island.
