= Coptobasis mesospectralis =

Scientific classification
- Domain: Eukaryota
- Kingdom: Animalia
- Phylum: Arthropoda
- Class: Insecta
- Order: Lepidoptera
- Family: Crambidae
- Subfamily: Spilomelinae
- Genus: Coptobasis
- Species: C. mesospectralis

Binomial name
- Coptobasis mesospectralis Hampson, 1897

Species of moth

Coptobasis mesospectralis is a moth in the family Crambidae. It was described by George Hampson in 1897. It is found in Indonesia on Pulo Laut, Ambon Island and the Natuna Islands.

The wingspan is about 36 mm. The forewings are dark brown with a cupreous tinge. There is an obscure dark spot in the cell of the forewing, and another on the discocellulars. There are traces of a postmedial line.
