= Berhala Island (Sumatra) =

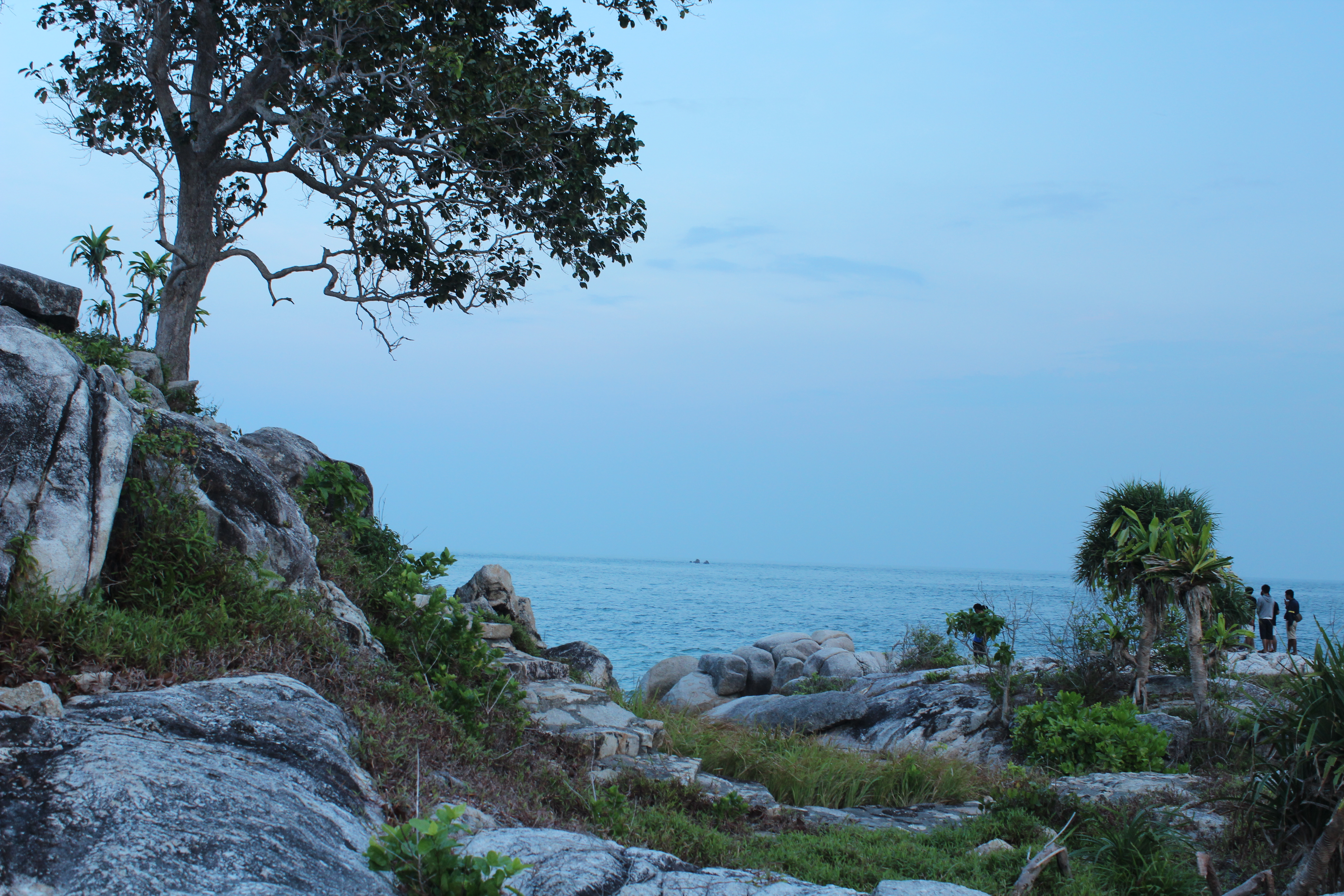
Sea View From Berhala Island is located in the Riau Islands Province, Indonesia

Berhala island is an island off Sumatra in Indonesia with an area of about 2.5 km^{2}. It is located in the Berhala Strait between Jambi and Singkep, Riau Islands. The island is administered from Lingga Regency, Riau Islands.

== History ==
In the past, the island was at the center of a provincial disputed between nearby provinces. In 1982, it involved two provinces, Riau and Jambi. Riau claimed the island as an integral part of Riau Islands, one of it regencies. In 2002, the regency was upgraded into a new province, the Riau Islands as the 32th province of Indonesia. The dispute parties then switched from between Riau and Jambi to between Riau Islands and Jambi. The matter was brought for adjudication to Supreme Court, and in 2012, the Court awarded the island to Riau Islands.

== See also ==
- Jambi (province)
- Riau Islands
- Riau
- Berhala Strait
