= Coptobasis sulcialis =

Scientific classification
- Domain: Eukaryota
- Kingdom: Animalia
- Phylum: Arthropoda
- Class: Insecta
- Order: Lepidoptera
- Family: Crambidae
- Subfamily: Spilomelinae
- Genus: Coptobasis
- Species: C. sulcialis

Binomial name
- Coptobasis sulcialis (Walker, 1859)

Synonyms
- Botys sulcialis Walker, 1859

Species of moth

Coptobasis sulcialis is a moth in the family Crambidae. It was described by Francis Walker in 1859. It is found on Borneo.
