= Coptobasis arctalis =

Scientific classification
- Domain: Eukaryota
- Kingdom: Animalia
- Phylum: Arthropoda
- Class: Insecta
- Order: Lepidoptera
- Family: Crambidae
- Subfamily: Spilomelinae
- Genus: Coptobasis
- Species: C. arctalis

Binomial name
- Coptobasis arctalis (Guenée, 1854)

Synonyms
- Hyalitis arctalis Guenée, 1854

Species of moth

Coptobasis arctalis is a moth in the family Crambidae. It was described by Achille Guenée in 1854. It is found in western India.
