= Coptobasis moellingeri =

Scientific classification
- Kingdom: Animalia
- Phylum: Arthropoda
- Class: Insecta
- Order: Lepidoptera
- Family: Crambidae
- Subfamily: Spilomelinae
- Genus: Coptobasis
- Species: C. moellingeri

Binomial name
- Coptobasis moellingeri Snellen, 1895

Species of moth

Coptobasis moellingeri is a moth in the family Crambidae. It was described by Snellen in 1895. It is found on Java.
