= Midai Island =

Island in Riau Islands, Indonesia

Native name: Pulau Midai
- Location of Midai Island in Riau Islands Province

Geography
- Location: South China Sea
- Coordinates: 2.998056°N 107.780831°E
- Archipelago: South Natuna
- Area: 26.19 km^{2} (10.11 sq mi)
- Highest elevation: 126 m (413 ft)

Administration
- Indonesia
- Province: Riau Islands
- Regency: Natuna Islands
- Largest settlement: Sabang Barat

Demographics
- Population: 5,289 (mid 2023 estimate)
- Pop. density: 202/km^{2} (523/sq mi)
- Ethnic groups: Malays

Additional information
- Time zone: Western Indonesia Time (UTC+7)

Midai Island is an island in the Natuna Regency, Riau Islands, Indonesia. The island area of 26.19 km^{2} is split between the Midai District and the Suak Midai District, with a combined population of 5,289 in mid 2023. The island is only accessible by boat and has a port on the west side of the island, near Sabang Barat.
