= Coptobasis lophocera =

Scientific classification
- Kingdom: Animalia
- Phylum: Arthropoda
- Class: Insecta
- Order: Lepidoptera
- Family: Crambidae
- Subfamily: Spilomelinae
- Genus: Coptobasis
- Species: C. lophocera

Binomial name
- Coptobasis lophocera Hampson, 1907

Species of moth

Coptobasis lophocera is a moth in the family Crambidae. It was described by George Hampson in 1907. It is found in southern Sulawesi.
