= Ranai, Natuna Island =

City in Riau Islands, Indonesia

Ranai Kota
- Village
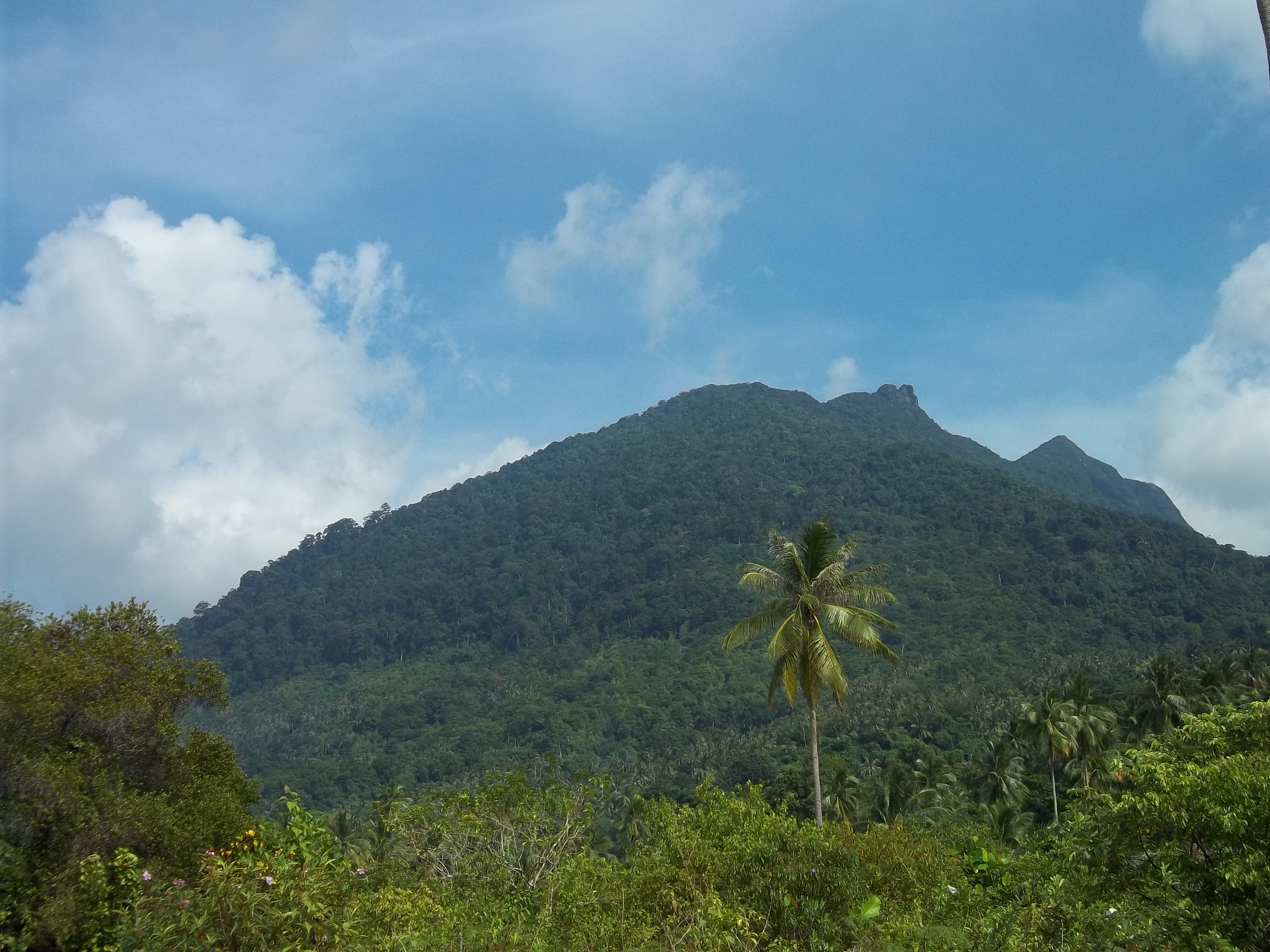
- Mount Ranai

- Location in South China Sea Location in the Riau Islands
- Coordinates: 3°56′N 108°23′E
- Country: Indonesia
- Province: Riau Islands
- Regency: Natuna Regency
- District: East Bunguran

Population (mid 2025 estimate)
  - Total: 8,735
- Time zone: UTC+7 (Indonesia Western Time)
- Post code: 29783
- Area code: (+62) 773

Ranai Kota (lit. 'Ranai Town') is the administrative capital of the Natuna Regency archipelago in the Riau Islands, Indonesia. It has one airport and can be reached by boat. It is located on Bunguran Island, in East Bunguran District (kecamatan Bunguran Timur), which had a population of 29,675 in mid 2025, of whom 9,361 lived in Ranai town (Ranai Kota), 3,536 in Ranai Darat, 5,738 in Bandarsyah and 5,258 in Batu Hitam; the four kelurahan (urban villages) thus together had 23,893 inhabitants in 2025, in an area of 47.68 km^{2}.

== Medical ==
There is a hospital, Rumah Sakit Umum Daerah Natuna (RSUD Natuna) located on Jalan Ali Murtopo.

== Transport ==
=== Air ===
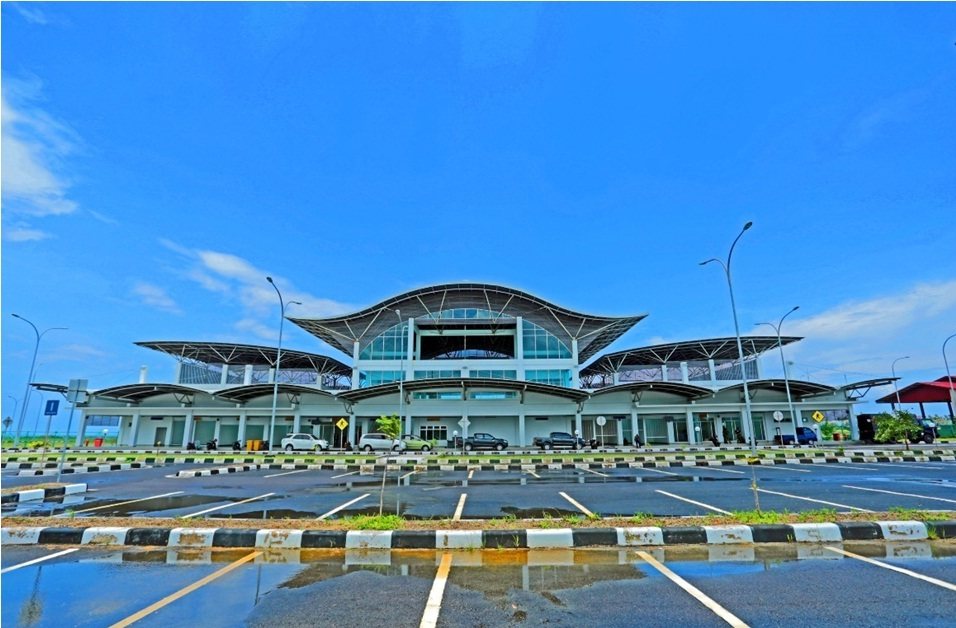
Ranai Airport

Raden Sadjad Airport located in Ranai Kota serves flights to Batam and Tanjungpinang.

=== Sea ===
Ranai Kota also has a port, its name is Port of Penagi.

== Climate ==
Ranai Kota has a tropical rainforest climate (Af) with heavy rainfall year-round.

Climate data for Ranai Kota
Month	Jan	Feb	Mar	Apr	May	Jun	Jul	Aug	Sep	Oct	Nov	Dec	Year
Mean daily maximum °C (°F)	28.1 (82.6)	28.5 (83.3)	29.7 (85.5)	30.9 (87.6)	31.1 (88.0)	30.7 (87.3)	30.7 (87.3)	30.5 (86.9)	30.6 (87.1)	30.2 (86.4)	29.8 (85.6)	28.7 (83.7)	30.0 (85.9)
Daily mean °C (°F)	25.5 (77.9)	25.8 (78.4)	26.6 (79.9)	27.2 (81.0)	27.4 (81.3)	27.2 (81.0)	27.1 (80.8)	26.9 (80.4)	27.1 (80.8)	26.8 (80.2)	26.6 (79.9)	26.0 (78.8)	26.7 (80.0)
Mean daily minimum °C (°F)	22.9 (73.2)	23.2 (73.8)	23.5 (74.3)	23.6 (74.5)	23.8 (74.8)	23.7 (74.7)	23.5 (74.3)	23.4 (74.1)	23.6 (74.5)	23.5 (74.3)	23.4 (74.1)	23.3 (73.9)	23.5 (74.2)
Average precipitation mm (inches)	232 (9.1)	129 (5.1)	177 (7.0)	141 (5.6)	162 (6.4)	167 (6.6)	155 (6.1)	144 (5.7)	187 (7.4)	291 (11.5)	257 (10.1)	279 (11.0)	2,321 (91.6)
Source: Climate-Data.org

== Religion ==
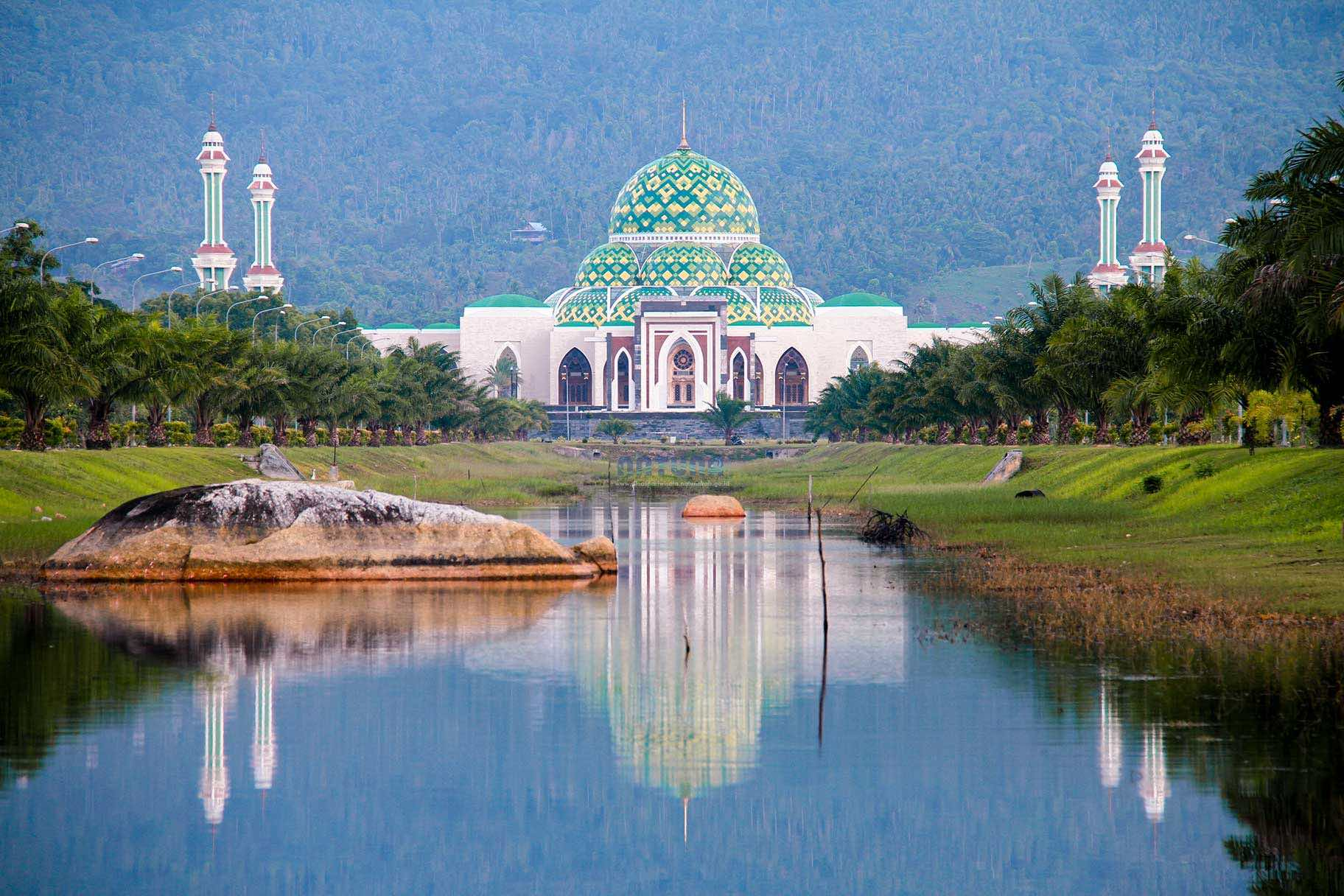
Natuna Great Mosque, Ranai

A couple of mosques exist, some being the Nurul Falah Mosque and the Ibnu Salim Mosque. Ranai Kota also has several churches, located not far from the downtown and also airport.
