= Coptobasis dentalis =

Scientific classification
- Domain: Eukaryota
- Kingdom: Animalia
- Phylum: Arthropoda
- Class: Insecta
- Order: Lepidoptera
- Family: Crambidae
- Subfamily: Spilomelinae
- Genus: Coptobasis
- Species: C. dentalis

Binomial name
- Coptobasis dentalis Pagenstecher, 1900

Species of moth

Coptobasis dentalis is a moth in the family Crambidae. It was described by Pagenstecher in 1900. It is found in Papua New Guinea, where it has been recorded from the Duke of York Islands.
