= Coptobasis opisalis =

Scientific classification
- Domain: Eukaryota
- Kingdom: Animalia
- Phylum: Arthropoda
- Class: Insecta
- Order: Lepidoptera
- Family: Crambidae
- Subfamily: Spilomelinae
- Genus: Coptobasis
- Species: C. opisalis

Binomial name
- Coptobasis opisalis (Walker, 1859)

Synonyms
- Desmia opisalis Walker, 1859

Species of moth

Coptobasis opisalis is a moth in the family Crambidae. It was described by Francis Walker in 1859. It has been recorded from India.

Adults are brown with metallic purple, blue and green reflections. The interior line on the wings is white. The marginal line is whitish.
