= Serasan Island =

Island in Natuna Regency, Riau Islands Province, Indonesia

Native name: Pulau Serasan
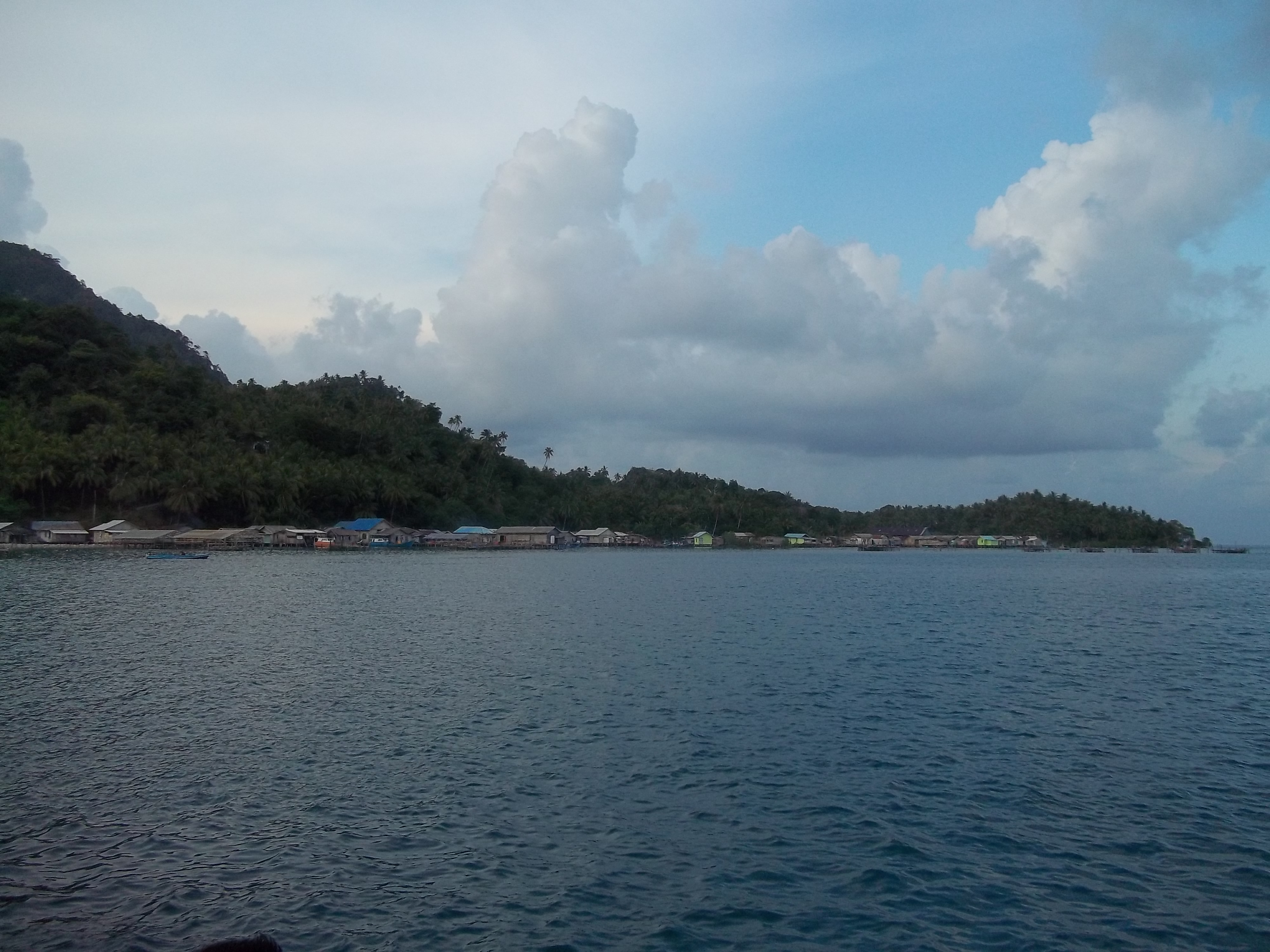
- Serasan Harbor, southeast of the island

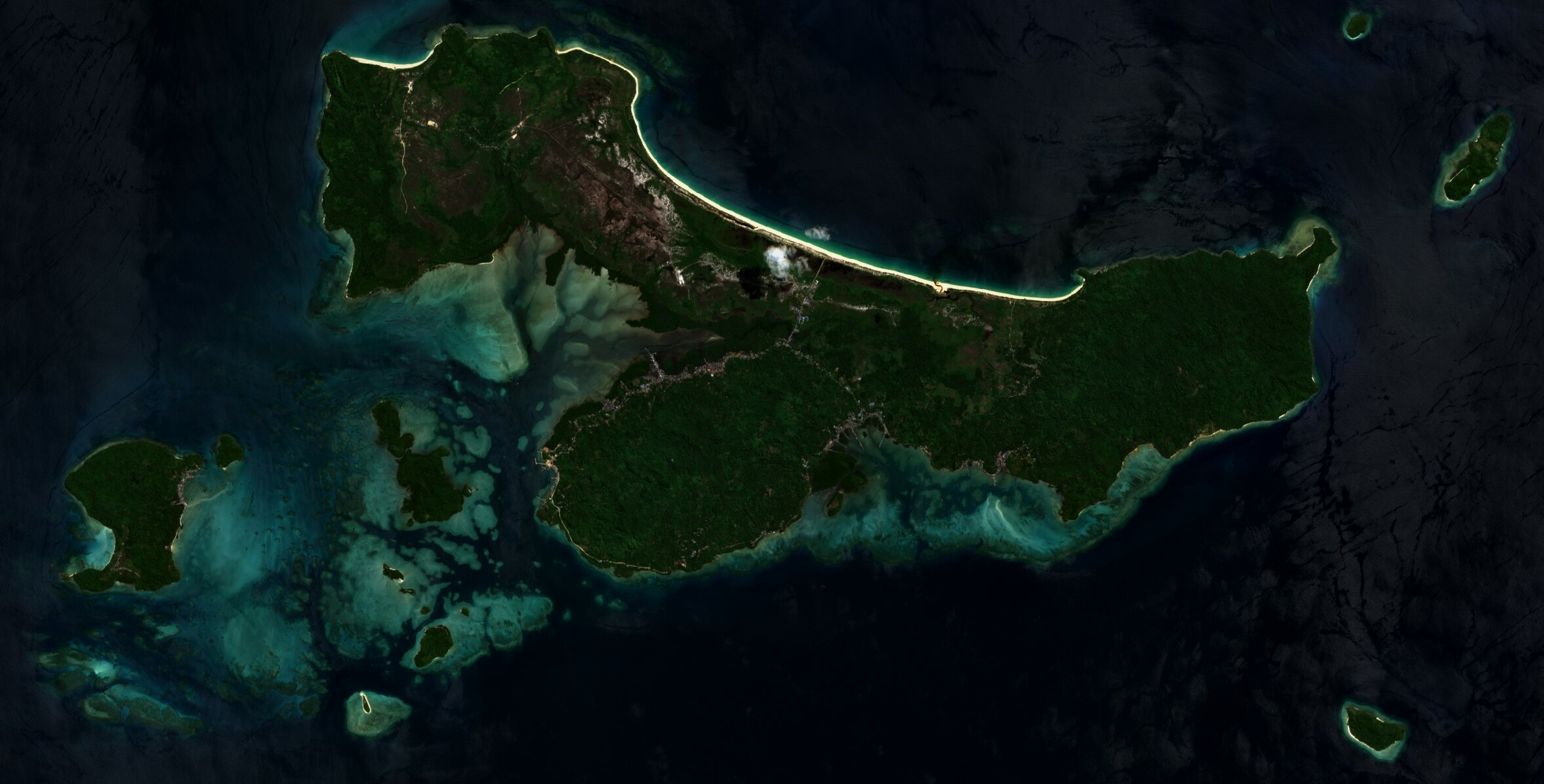
- A satellite image of Serasan Island and surrounding islands

- Location of Serasan Island in Riau Islands Province

Geography
- Location: South China Sea
- Coordinates: 2.5125°N 109.059167°E
- Archipelago: South Natuna
- Area: 45.96 km^{2} (17.75 sq mi)
- Highest elevation: 441 m (1447 ft)

Administration
- Indonesia
- Province: Riau Islands
- Regency: Natuna Islands
- Largest settlement: Serasan

Demographics
- Ethnic groups: Malays

Additional information
- Time zone: Western Indonesia Time (UTC+7)

Serasan Island is an island in the Natuna Regency, Riau Islands, Indonesia. The island is split between two districts, the Serasan District is on the west side and Serasan Timur is on the east side. On March 6, 2023, heavy rainfall created landslides on the island, killing 15 and leaving many more missing. The island hosts the critically endangered Natuna Islands Tarsier, which is endemic to the islands and whose population is declining rapidly.
