= Berhala Strait =

Strait in Indonesia

- Selat Berhala (Indonesian)
- Location within Sumatra
- Coordinates: 00°48′S 104°25′E
- Type: strait
- Basin countries: Indonesia
- References: Selat Berhala: Indonesia National Geospatial-Intelligence Agency, Bethesda, MD, USA

Berhala Strait is a strait which separates the island of Sumatra and Singkep in the Natuna Sea (South China Sea), Indonesia.

Berhala island in the strait, attribution has been contested by Riau Islands and Jambi province.

== See also ==
- List of straits
