= Coptobasis luminalis =

Scientific classification
- Kingdom: Animalia
- Phylum: Arthropoda
- Clade: Pancrustacea
- Class: Insecta
- Order: Lepidoptera
- Family: Crambidae
- Subfamily: Spilomelinae
- Genus: Coptobasis
- Species: C. luminalis

Binomial name
- Coptobasis luminalis Lederer, 1863

Species of moth

Coptobasis luminalis is a moth in the family Crambidae. It was described by Julius Lederer in 1863. It is found in eastern India.
