= Coptobasis monochromalis =

Scientific classification
- Kingdom: Animalia
- Phylum: Arthropoda
- Class: Insecta
- Order: Lepidoptera
- Family: Crambidae
- Subfamily: Spilomelinae
- Genus: Coptobasis
- Species: C. monochromalis

Binomial name
- Coptobasis monochromalis (Walker, 1865)

Synonyms
- Botys monochromalis Walker, 1865

Species of moth

Coptobasis monochromalis is a moth in the family Crambidae. It was described by Francis Walker in 1865. It is found on the Sula Islands.
