= Coptobasis =

Scientific classification
- Kingdom: Animalia
- Phylum: Arthropoda
- Clade: Pancrustacea
- Class: Insecta
- Order: Lepidoptera
- Family: Crambidae
- Subfamily: Spilomelinae
- Genus: Coptobasis; Lederer, 1863

Genus of moths

Coptobasis is a genus of moths of the family Crambidae.

== Species ==
- Coptobasis arctalis (Guenée, 1854)
- Coptobasis dentalis Pagenstecher, 1900
- Coptobasis lophocera Hampson, 1907
- Coptobasis luminalis Lederer, 1863
- Coptobasis mesospectralis Hampson, 1897
- Coptobasis moellingeri Snellen, 1895
- Coptobasis monochromalis (Walker, 1865)
- Coptobasis opisalis (Walker, 1859)
- Coptobasis ridopalis Swinhoe, 1892
- Coptobasis spretalis Lederer, 1863
- Coptobasis sulcialis (Walker, 1859)
- Coptobasis textalis Lederer, 1863

== Former species ==
- Coptobasis lunalis (Guenée, 1854)
