= Coptobasis ridopalis =

Scientific classification
- Domain: Eukaryota
- Kingdom: Animalia
- Phylum: Arthropoda
- Class: Insecta
- Order: Lepidoptera
- Family: Crambidae
- Subfamily: Spilomelinae
- Genus: Coptobasis
- Species: C. ridopalis

Binomial name
- Coptobasis ridopalis C. Swinhoe, 1892

Species of moth

Coptobasis ridopalis is a moth in the family Crambidae. It was described by Charles Swinhoe in 1892. It is found in India's Khasi Hills.
