= Serasan =

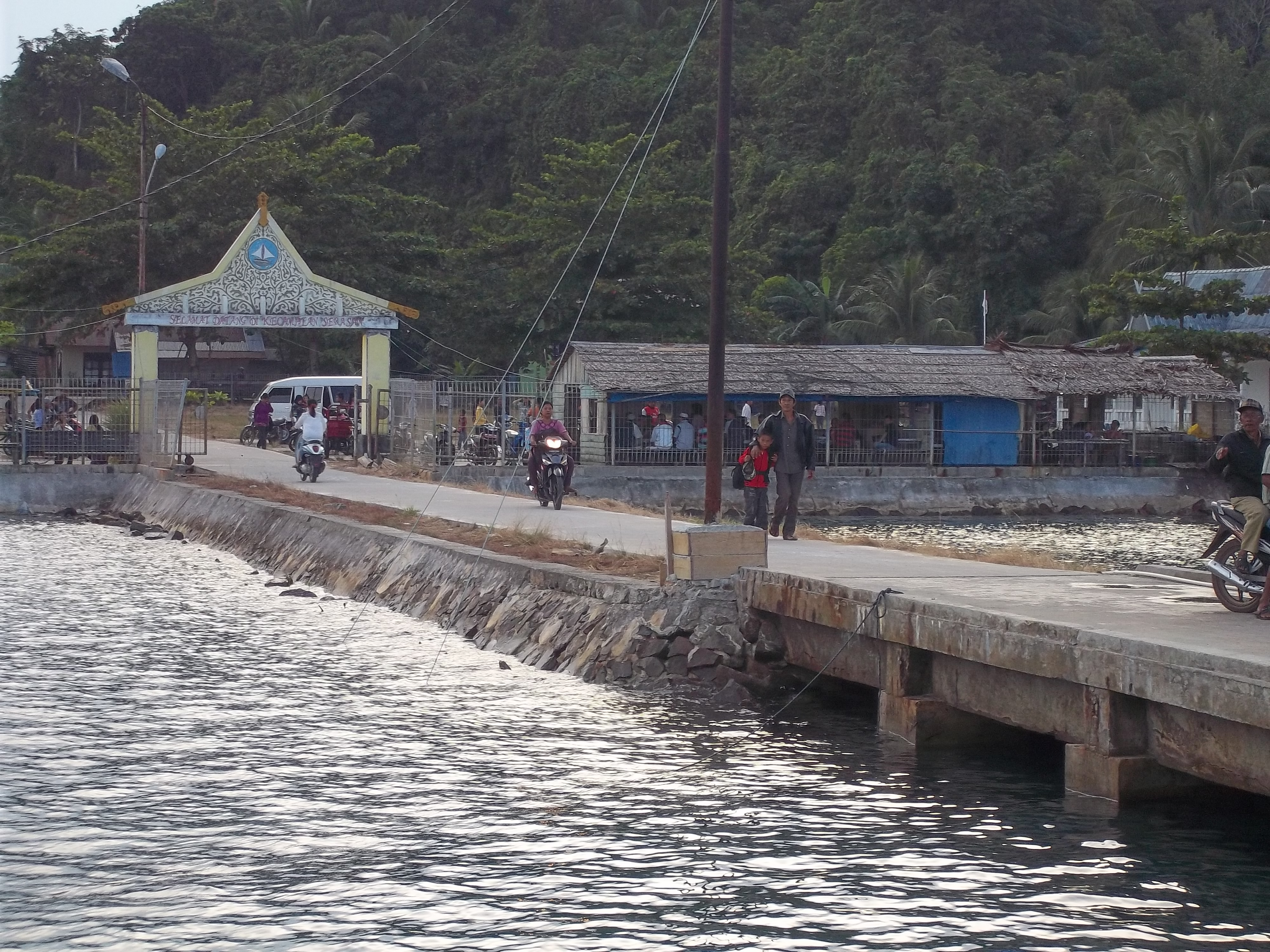
- View of Serasan Harbor

- Location within Riau Islands Location within Indonesia Location within South China Sea
- Coordinates: 2°30′35″N 109°01′32″E
- Country: Indonesia
- Province: Riau Islands
- Regency: Natuna Islands
- District: Serasan District

Area
  - Total: 29.52 km^{2} (11.40 sq mi)
- Elevation: 2 m (6.6 ft)

Population (2010)
  - Total: 2,658
  - Density: 90.04/km^{2} (233.2/sq mi)
- Time zone: UTC+7 (Western Indonesia Time)
- Area code: 29781

Serasan is a village on Serasan Island, Serasan District, Natuna Regency, Indonesia.
