= Coptobasis textalis =

Scientific classification
- Kingdom: Animalia
- Phylum: Arthropoda
- Clade: Pancrustacea
- Class: Insecta
- Order: Lepidoptera
- Family: Crambidae
- Subfamily: Spilomelinae
- Genus: Coptobasis
- Species: C. textalis

Binomial name
- Coptobasis textalis Lederer, 1863

Synonyms
- Coptobasis aenealis C. Swinhoe, 1885

Species of moth

Coptobasis textalis is a moth in the family Crambidae. It was described by Julius Lederer in 1863. It is found in India.
