= Natuna Island surili =

Conservation status
- Vulnerable (IUCN 3.1)

Scientific classification
- Kingdom: Animalia
- Phylum: Chordata
- Class: Mammalia
- Infraclass: Placentalia
- Order: Primates
- Family: Cercopithecidae
- Genus: Presbytis
- Species: P. natunae

Binomial name
- Presbytis natunae (Thomas & Hartert, 1894)
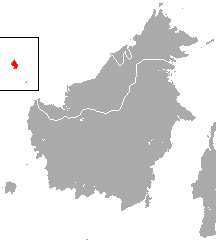
- Natuna Island surili range

Species of Old World monkey

The Natuna Island surili (Presbytis natunae) is a species of primate in the family Cercopithecidae.

== Details ==
The species is endemic to the Indonesian island of Natuna Besar. It was separated from P. siamensis by Groves in 2001.

A study published in 2003 estimates the population to be less than 10,000 as of 2002, the main threat being heavy logging since 1980.
