= Serasan District =

District in Natuna Regency, Riau Islands Province, Indonesia

Serasan
- District
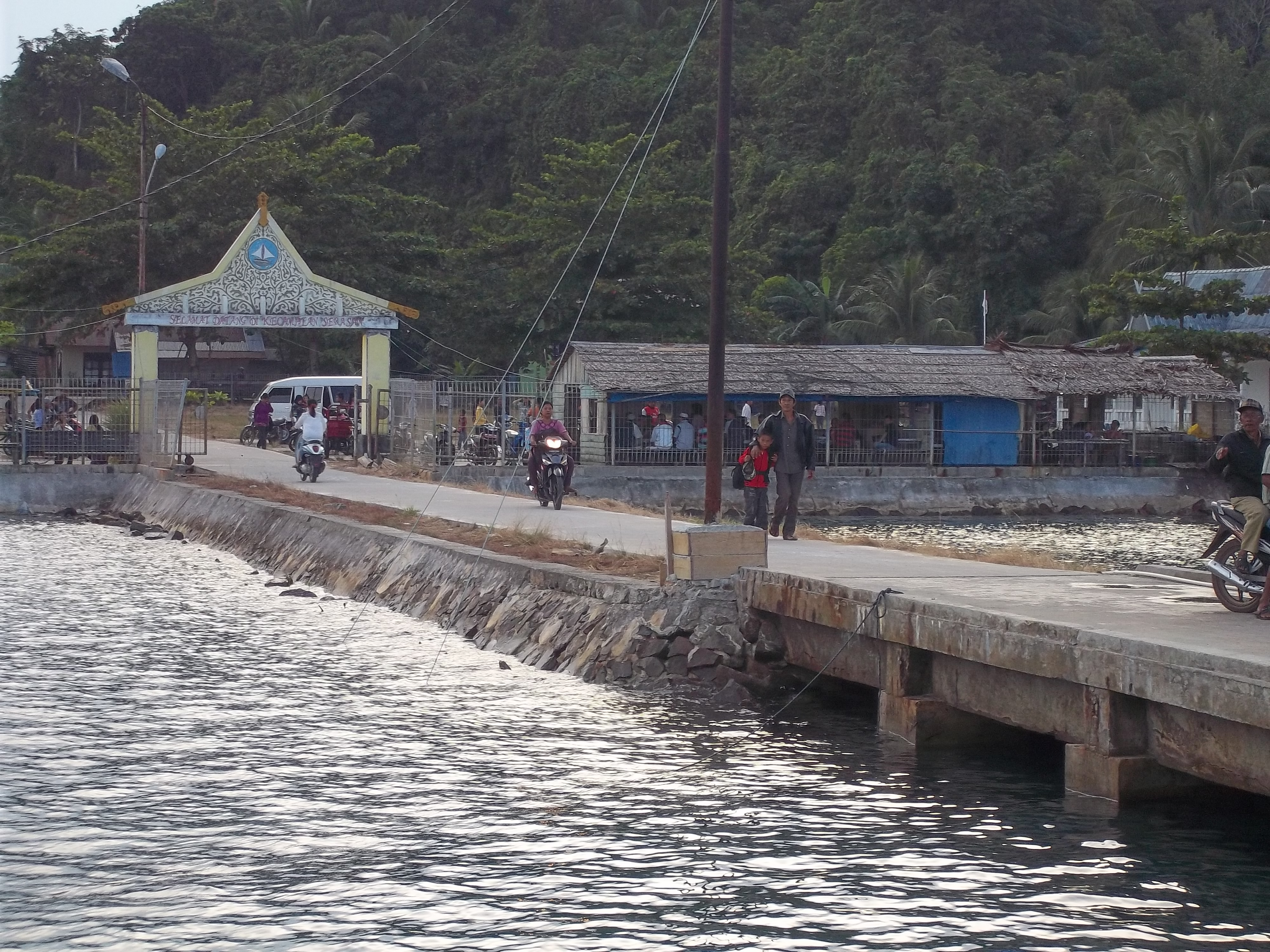
- View of Serasan Harbor

- Location within Riau Islands Location within Indonesia Location within South China Sea
- Coordinates: 2.5145°N 109.04485°E
- Country: Indonesia
- Province: Riau Islands
- Regency: Natuna Islands
- Administrative center: Serasan

Area
  - Total: 44.72 km^{2} (17.27 sq mi)
- Elevation: 2 m (6.6 ft)

Population (2022)
  - Total: 5,505
  - Density: 123.1/km^{2} (318.8/sq mi)
- Time zone: UTC+7 (Western Indonesia Time)
- Ethnic groups: Malays
- Language: Natuna Malay

Serasan is a district in the Natuna Regency, Riau Islands, Indonesia. It is located on the western half of Serasan Island and includes 34 named islands, 4 inhabited islands and 7 villages.

== Villages ==
There are 7 villages in the Serasan District. 5 villages use a spring for water, 1 uses a well, and 1 uses refillable water. All 7 villages use kerosene for cooking, and there are 1,566 families using electricity. The district is almost all Muslim, with 98.75% of the population practicing Islam, and the rest being Christian or Buddhist. There are 8 mosques in the district, with 1 in each village and 2 in Serasan. There are also 6 musallas, 1 in Jermalik and Tanjung Balau, and 2 in Pangkalan and Serasan. There are 17 sports facilities in the district. Each town has a volleyball court, 5 have a soccer field, 4 have a table tennis facility, and there is also 1 futsal, billiards, badminton and court tennis facility in the district. There are 3 lodges in the district, 3 in Serasan and 1 in Tanjung Setelung. There is public transportation in 6 villages, although there are no fixed routes. All villages also have asphalt or concrete roads open throughout the year. There is an operational post office in the village of Serasan with the postal code of 29781. There are 4 cell towers in the district, and at least 1 communication service operators serves the villages. All but 2 villages have 4G LTE, with Tanjung Balau and Pangkalan only having 2.5G. There are 8 restaurants on the island, with all but 1 in Serasan.

Villages of Serasan
Village	Area (km²)	% of subdistrict area	Terrian
Kampung Hilir (id)	1.60	3.58	Plains
Batu Berian (id)	8.15	18.22	Slopes
Tanjung Setelung (id)	3.53	7.90	Slopes
Tanjung Balau (id)	3.05	6.82	Slopes
Pangkalan (id)	6.06	13.56	Plains
Jermalik (id)	17.33	38.76	Plains
Serasan	4.99	11.66	Plains

Population
Village	Males	Females	Total	% of total population
Kampung Hilir	270	257	527	9.87
Batu Berian	362	366	728	13.63
Tanjung Setelung	329	308	637	11.93
Tanjung Balau	255	219	474	8.87
Pangkalan	278	259	537	10.05
Jermalik	231	204	435	8.14
Serasan	1,011	992	2,003	37.50
Total	2,736	2,605	5,341	100.00

Population Statistics
Village	Population density (km²)	Sex ratio	# of households
Kampung Hilir	329.58	105.06	167
Batu Berian	89.36	98.91	219
Tanjung Setelung	180.23	106.82	186
Tanjung Balau	155.53	116.44	158
Pangkalan	88.57	107.34	163
Jermalik	25.10	113.24	129
Serasan	401.23	101.92	691
Total	119.44	105.03	1,713

== Education ==
Type of school	# of schools⠀⠀⠀⠀⠀⠀⠀Students⠀⠀⠀⠀⠀⠀⠀⠀Teachers					
Type of school	Public	Private	Public	Private	Public	Private
Kindergarten	1	6	81	99	11	17
Raudhatul Athfal (id)	0	2	0	68	0	10
Elementary School	7	0	559	0	89	0
Junior High School	3	0	239	0	40	0
Madrasah Tsanawiyah (id)	0	1	0	62	0	14
Senior High School	1	0	277	0	31	0
Total	12	9	1156	229	171	41

== History ==
On March 6, 2023, landslides caused by heavy rains on the islands, killed 50 and left many missing.
