= Natuna Besar =

Main island of the Bunguran Islands in Indonesia

Pulau Natuna Besar
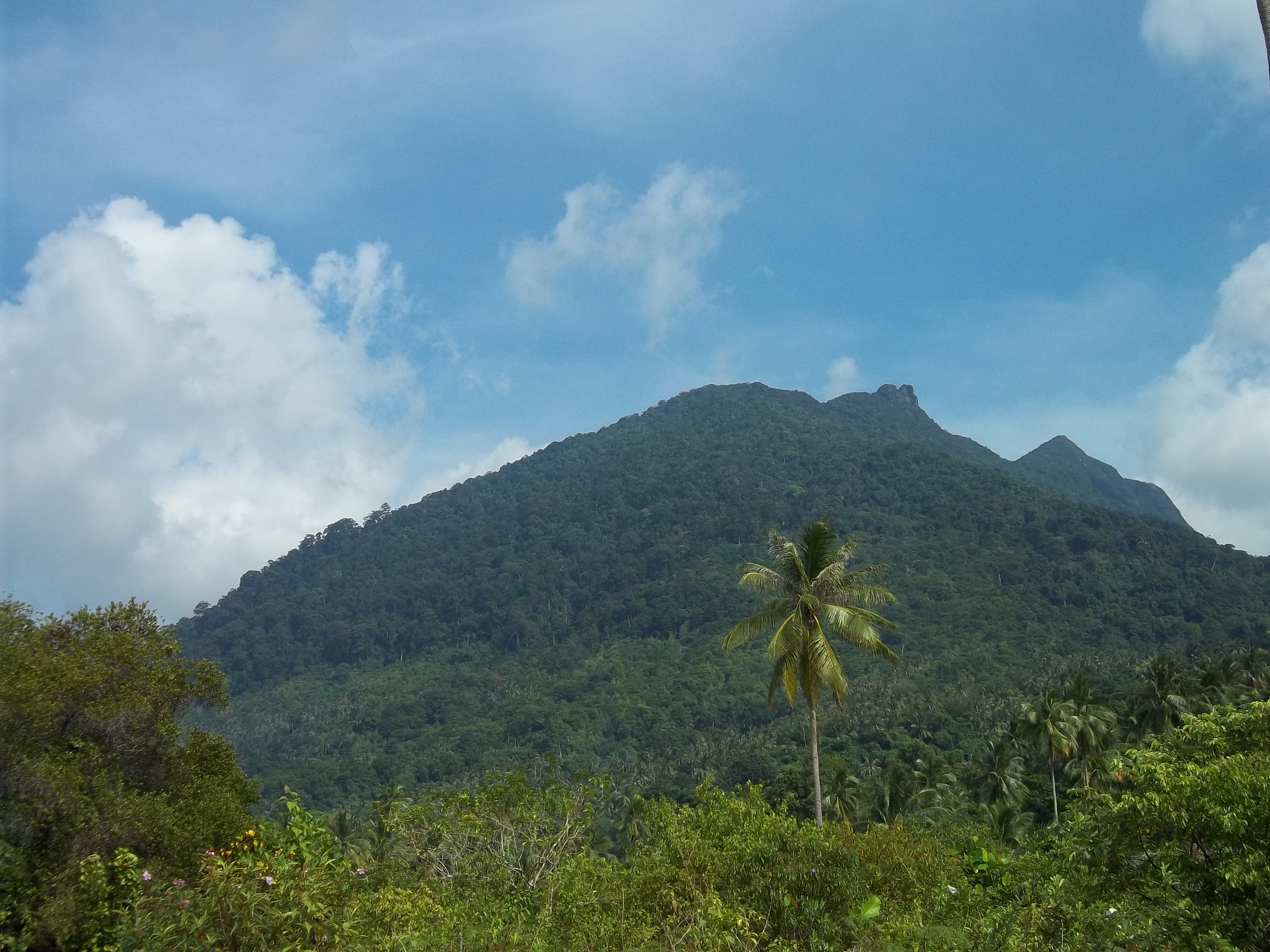
- Mount Ranai on Pulau Natuna Besar

- Location within Riau Islands Location within Sumatra Location within Indonesia Location within South China Sea
- Other names: Bunguran Island

Geography
- Location: South China Sea
- Coordinates: 03°54′59.74″N 108°12′7.34″E
- Archipelago: Bunguran Islands
- Area: 1,633 km^{2} (631 sq mi)
- Length: 58 km (36 mi)
- Coastline: 359 km (223.1 mi)
- Highest elevation: 835 m (2740 ft)

Administration
- Indonesia
- Province: Riau Islands
- Regency: Natuna
- Largest town: Ranai

Demographics
- Population: 58,820 (2023)
- Pop. density: 36/km^{2} (93/sq mi)
- Ethnic groups: Malays

Pulau Natuna Besar (Indonesian for 'Great Natuna Island'), also known as Bunguran Island (Indonesian: Pulau Bunguran, or just Bunguran) is the main island of the Bunguran Islands, in the Natuna Regency, which is part of the Riau Islands Province in Indonesia.

The area of Natuna Besar is 1,633 km^{2} (631 sq mi) with a coastline of 359 km (223 mi). The highest point is Mount Ranai at 1,035 metres (3,396 ft). The island had a population of 58,820 inhabitants according to the official estimate for mid 2023. The principal settlement is Ranai. The island can be reached by scheduled air services via Ranai Airport.

The island is home to three species of non-human primates: the slow loris (Nycticebus coucang), the long-tailed macaque (Macaca fascicularis), and the endemic animal on Natuna Besar which is threatened with extinction is the Natuna Island surili (a.k.a. Natuna pale-thighed surili, Presbytis natunae). Two subspecies of mouse deer are also endemic to Natuna Besar, namely the greater mouse-deer ( Tragulus napu bunguranensis ) and the lesser mouse-deer ( Tragulus kanchil everetti ). A small number of wild goats live on the island as well as sea birds. Over 360 species of bird have been recorded on the island.

There is a large mosque in the north-east corner of the island. The Grand Mosque of Natuna was built over two years from 2007 to 2009.

On December 18, 2018, Indonesian Armed Forces opened a naval military base with over 1,000 personnels on Natuna Besar.

Natuna Besar has a tropical rainforest climate (Af) with heavy rainfall year-round.

Climate data for Natuna Besar
Month	Jan	Feb	Mar	Apr	May	Jun	Jul	Aug	Sep	Oct	Nov	Dec	Year
Mean daily maximum °C (°F)	25 (77)	25 (77)	26 (79)	25 (77)	26 (79)	23 (73)	25 (77)	25 (77)	26 (79)	25 (77)	25 (77)	23 (73)	25 (77)
Mean daily minimum °C (°F)	21 (70)	21 (70)	22 (72)	22 (72)	23 (73)	22 (72)	22 (72)	21 (70)	22 (72)	22 (72)	21 (70)	21 (70)	22 (71)
Average precipitation mm (inches)	215 (8.5)	316 (12.4)	21 (0.8)	107 (4.2)	112 (4.4)	196 (7.7)	212 (8.3)	162 (6.4)	138 (5.4)	172 (6.8)	218 (8.6)	526 (20.7)	2,394 (94.3)
