= Midai =

District in Natuna Regency, Riau Islands Province, Indonesia

Native name: Pulau Midai
- Location within South China Sea Location within Indonesia

Geography
- Location: South China Sea
- Coordinates: 2.992°N 107.768°E
- Archipelago: Natuna Islands
- Area: 13.77 km^{2} (5.32 sq mi)

Administration
- Indonesia
- Province: Riau Islands
- Regency: Natuna Islands
- Archipelago: South Natuna

Demographics
- Population: 3,718 (2022)
- Ethnic groups: Malays

Additional information
- Time zone: Western Indonesian Time (UTC+7)

Midai is a district in the Natuna Regency, Riau Islands, Indonesia. It is located on the eastern half of Midai island and shares the island with the district of Suak Midai.

== Villages ==
All 3 villages in Midai rely on wells for their water. There is only one medical facility in Sabang that is an inpatient health center and a pharmacy. All but 5 families use electricity in the district, and they are in Sebelat. There are 4 mosques in the district, with 1 in each village and 2 in Sabang. There are also 13 musallas, 2 in Air Putih, 3 in Sebelat, and 8 in Sabang as well as a monastery in Sabang. The district is almost exclusively Muslim, with around 1% of people in Sabang being Buddhist and 0.7% of people being Christian. There are 4 lodges in the village of Sabang. The district has one post office in Sabang and the districts postal code is 29784.

Villages of Serasan
Village	Area (km^{2})	% of subdistrict area	Topography
Sebelat	4.73	34.33	Slopes
Air Putih	3.96	28.76	Plains
Sabang Barat	5.08	36.90	Plains

Population
Village	Males	Females	Total	% of total population
Sebelat	286	277	563	15.49
Air Putih	252	227	479	13.18
Sabang Barat	1,305	1,288	2,593	71.33
Total	1,843	1,792	3,635	100.00

Population Statistics
Village	Population density (km^{2})	Sex ratio	# of households
Sebelat	119.09	103.25	207
Air Putih	120.95	111.01	148
Sabang Barat	510.35	101.32	875
Total	264.01	102.85	1,230

== Education ==
# of Schools Students Teachers
Type of school	Public	Private	Public	Private	Public	Private
Kindergarten	1	0	42	0	7	0
Elementary School	4	0	344	0	48	0
Madrasah Ibtidaiyah	0	1	0	66	0	11
Junior High School	1	0	159	0	16	0
Madrasah Tsanawiyah	1	0	120	0	22	0
Senior High School	1	0	214	0	27	0
Madrasah Aliyah	0	1	0	55	0	17
Total	8	2	879	121	120	128
