= South Natuna =

Archipelago in Indonesia

Location of South Natuna in Riau Islands Province

South Natuna (Indonesian: Natuna Selatan) is an archipelago off the west coast of the island of Borneo, the southernmost group of the Natuna Islands in the South China Sea. Geographically it is part of the Tudjuh Archipelago, and administratively part of the Riau Islands Province of Indonesia.

The archipelago is spread out over hundreds of kilometers. Major islands include Greater Subi Island (Pulau Subi Besar), Lesser Subi Island (Pulau Subi Kecil), Bakau, Panjang, Midai and Serasan. The Api Passage separates the South Natuna group from the island of Borneo. The Selasan Strait cuts through the bottom of the cluster of islands. Kepala Island is the easternmost island of Riau Islands Province.
