= Natuna Regency =

Regency in Riau Islands, Indonesia

Natuna Regency Kabupaten Natuna
- Regency

Other transcription(s)
  - Jawi: كڤولاوان ناتونا
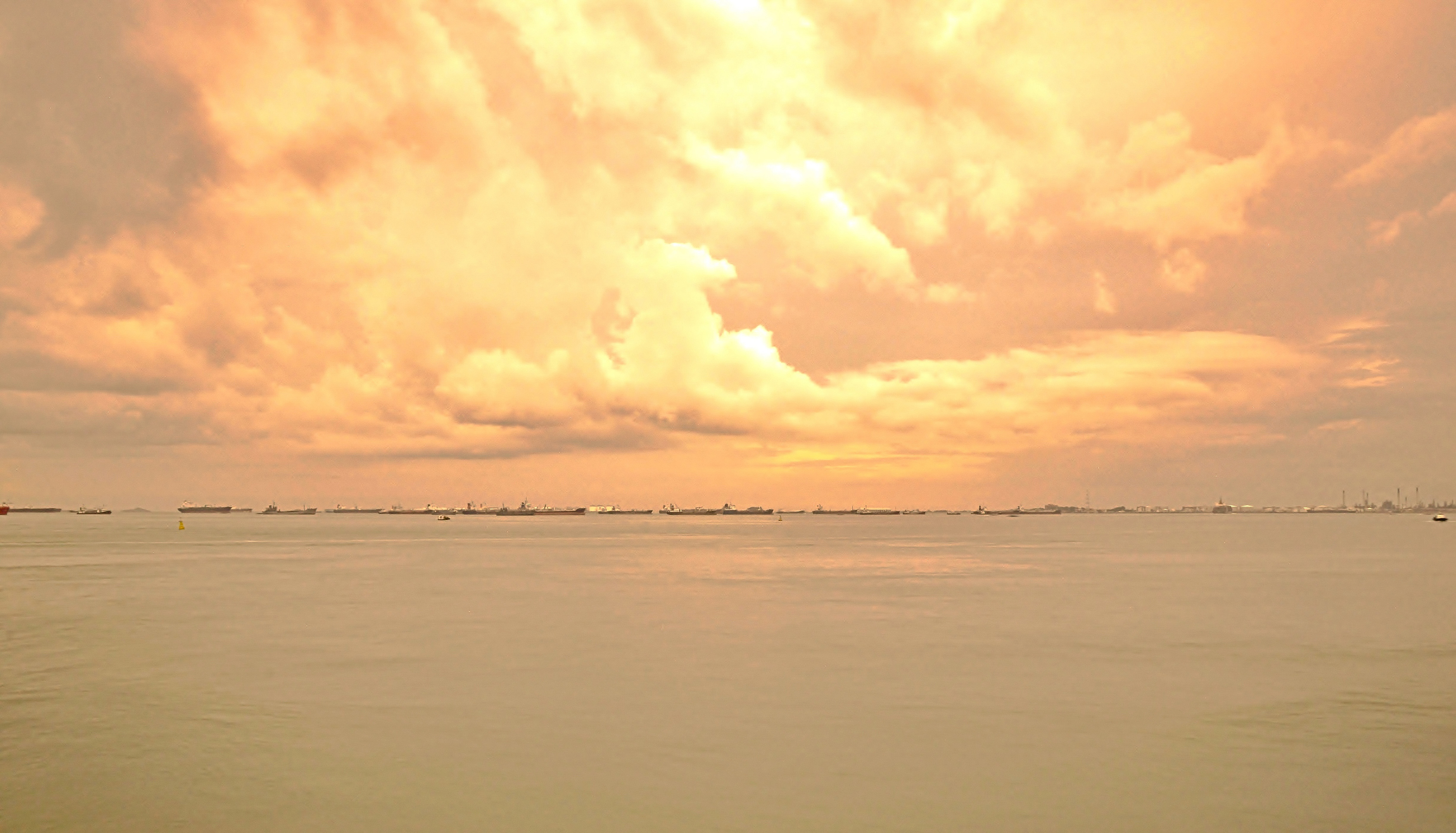
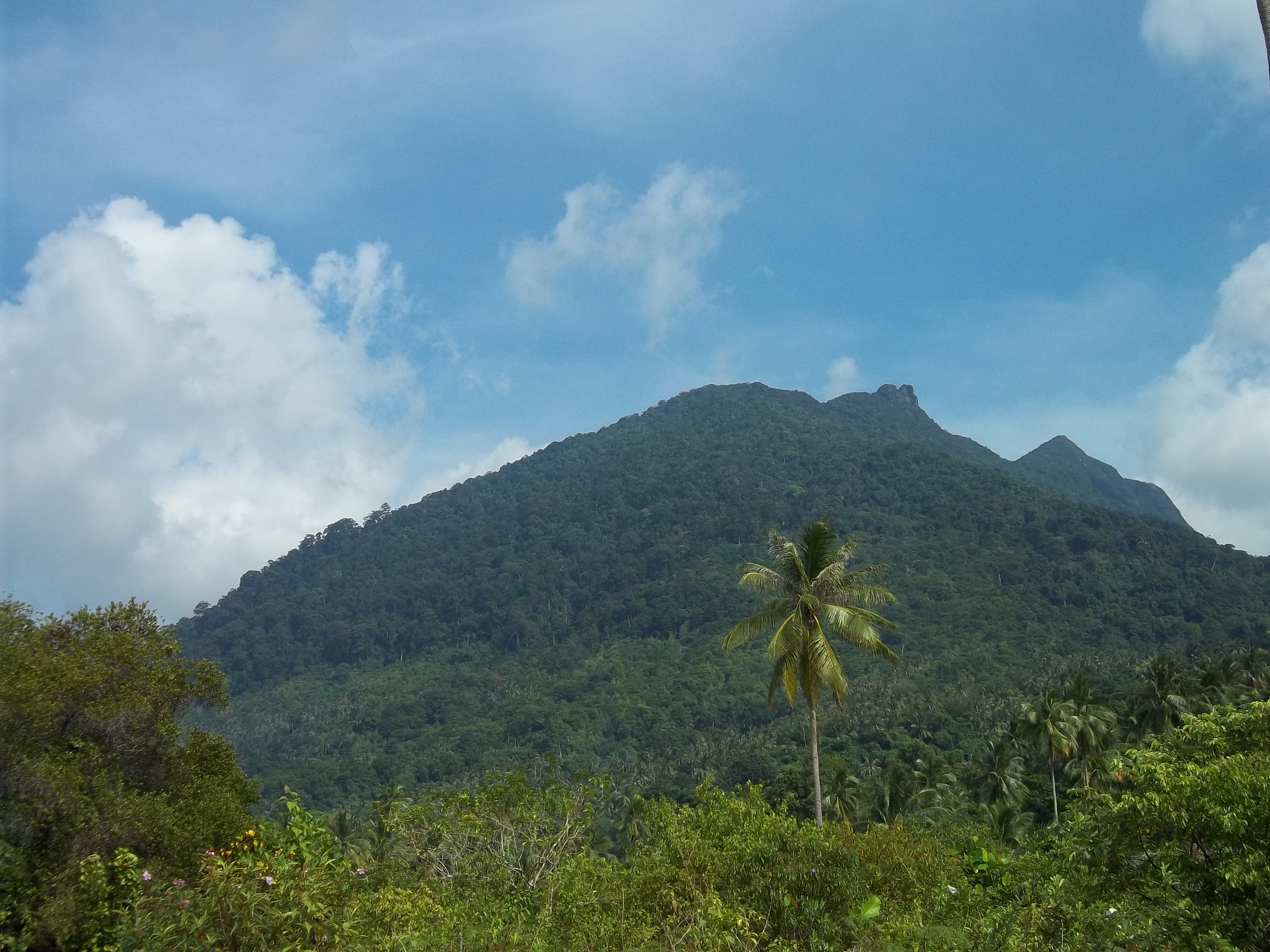
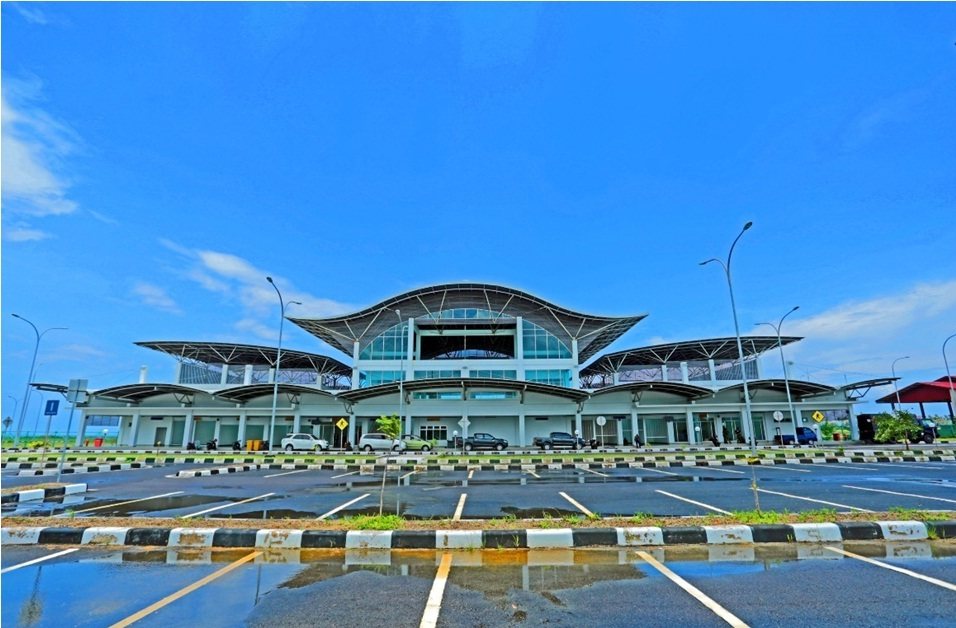
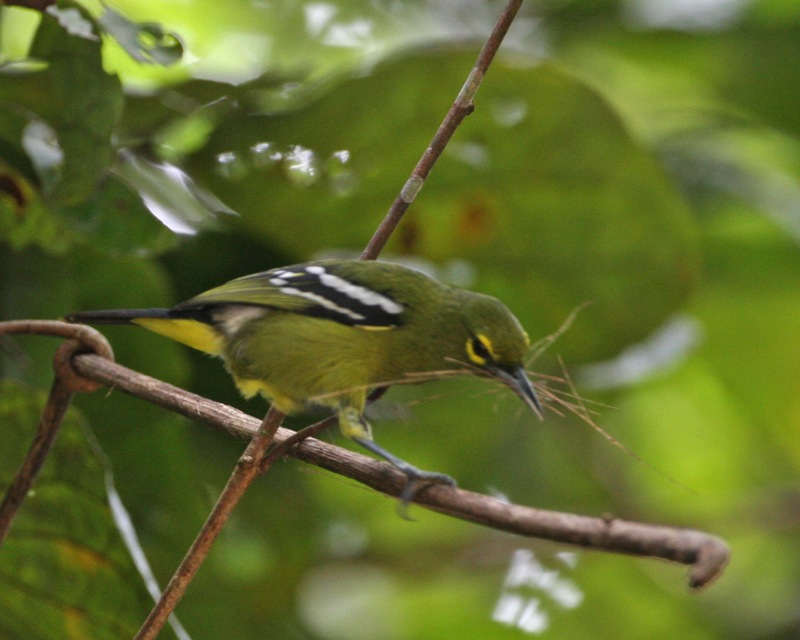
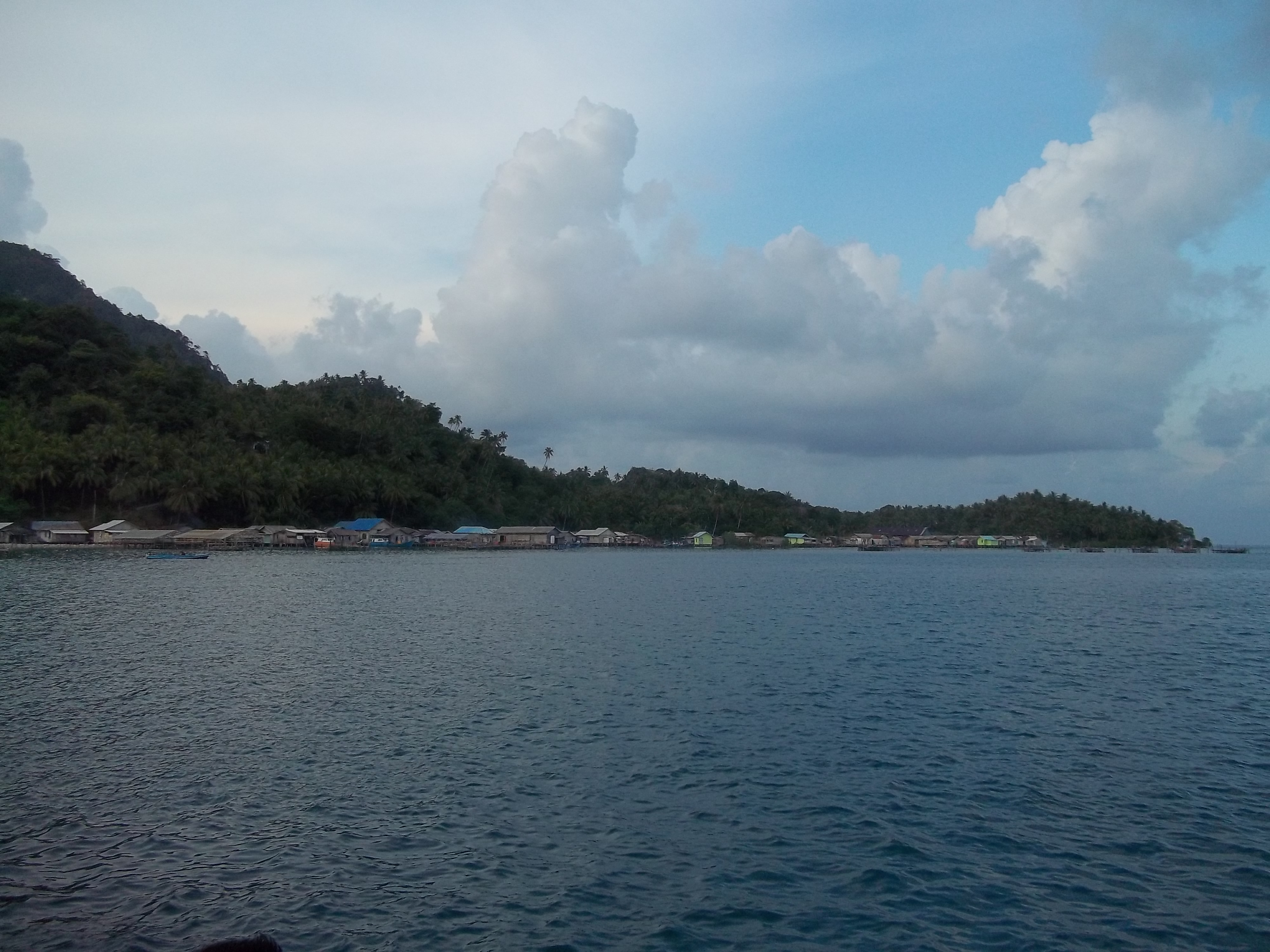
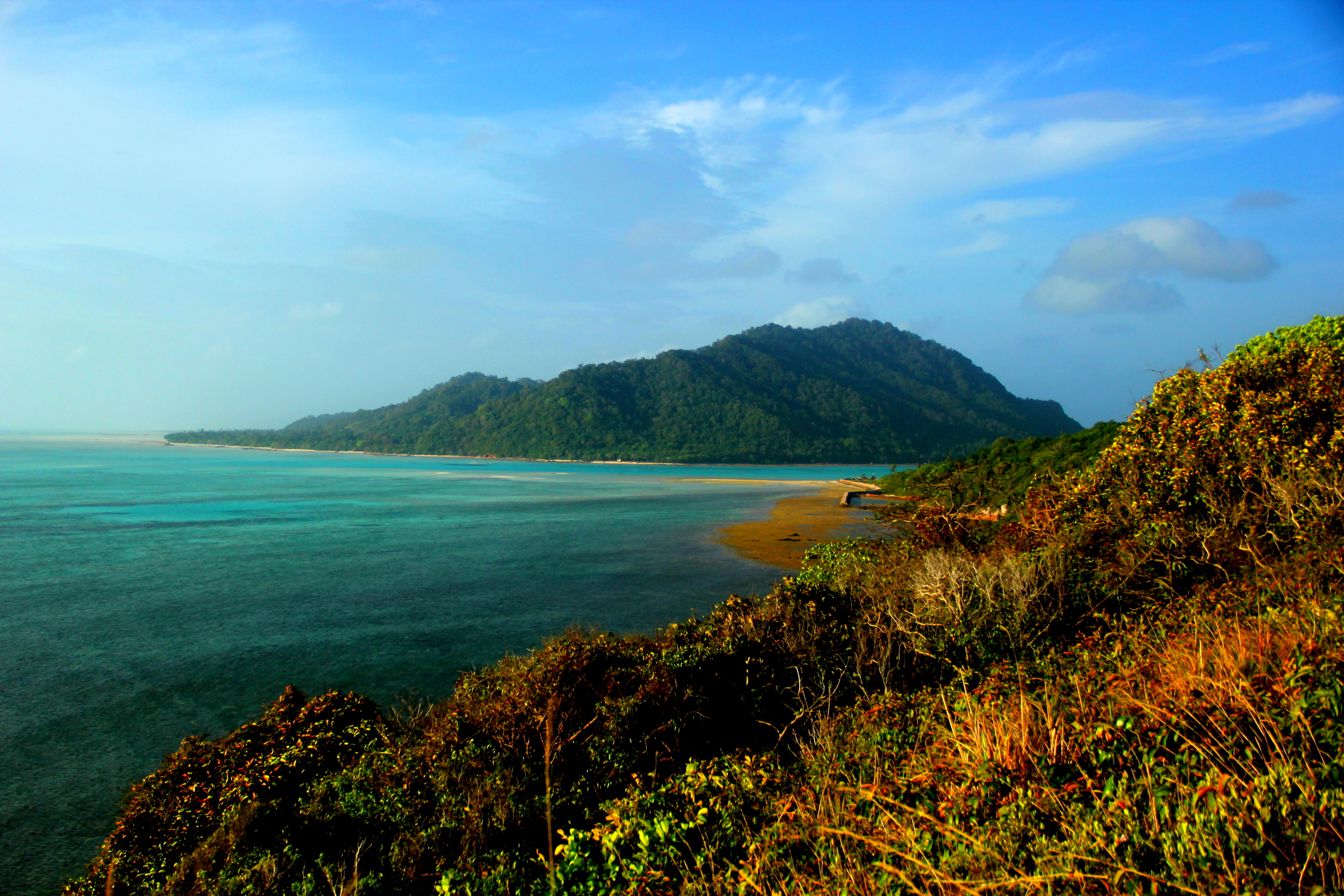
- From top, left to right: Natuna Sea, Mount Ranai, Ranai Airport, Endangered bird, Serasan Island harbour, Sekatung Island

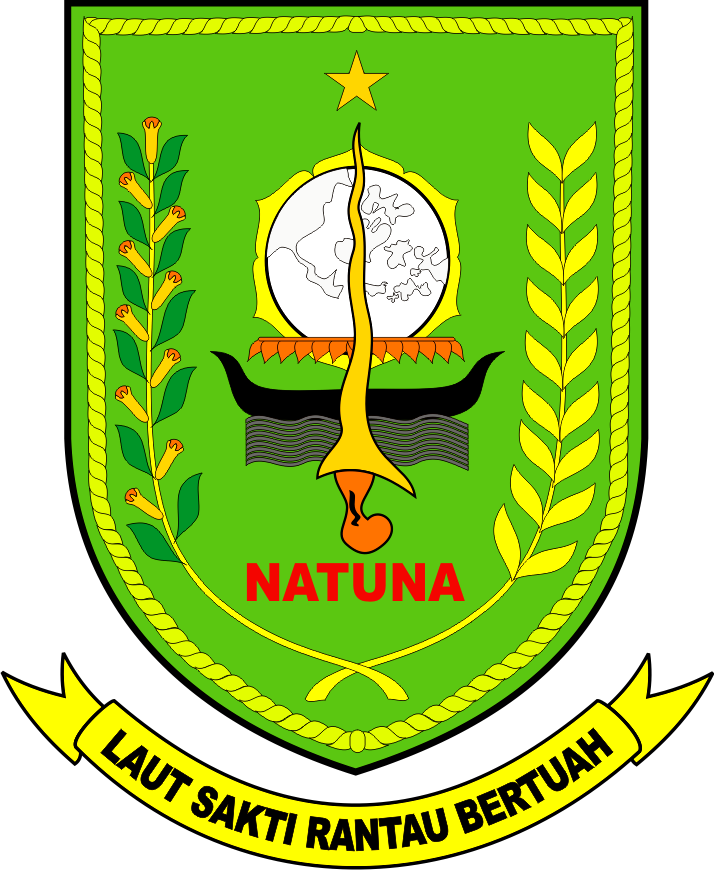
- Coat of arms
- Motto: Malay: Laut Sakti Rantau Bertuah (Sacred Ocean, Fortune Land)
- Interactive map
- Location of Natuna Regency Natuna Regency (Sumatra) Natuna Regency (Indonesia) Natuna Regency (South China Sea)
- Coordinates: 4°0′0″N 108°0′0″E
- Country: Indonesia
- Province: Riau Islands
- Discovery by I-Tsing: 671 A.D.
- Condominium of Johor Sultanate and Pattani Kingdom: 1597
- Afdeeling van Pulau Tudjuh: 1913
- Regency established: 12 October 1999
- Incorporation of Tambelan Archipelago into Bintan Regency: 18 December 2003
- Creation of Anambas Islands Regency: 31 July 2008
- Regency seat: Ranai
- Administrative division: 15 districts 77 villages

Government
  - Body: Regency's Government of Natuna Islands
  - Regent (Bupati): Cen Sui Lan
  - Vice Regent (Wakil Bupati): Jarmin Sidik
  - Council: Regency Council of Natuna
  - Member of Provincial Parliament: List of MPPs: Hadi Chandra (Golkar); Ilyas Sabli (Nat.Dem.); Taufik (PDI-P)

Area
  - Total: 28,200.37 km^{2} (10,888.22 sq mi)
  - Land: 1,983.90 km^{2} (765.99 sq mi)
  - Water: 26,222.06 km^{2} (10,124.39 sq mi) 99.25%

Population (mid 2025 estimate)
  - Total: 84,910
  - Density: 42/km^{2} (110/sq mi)
- Time zone: UTC+07:00 (Western Indonesia Time/W.I.B)
- Postcodes: 29775 to 29778 – Natuna Besar; 29779 – Subi Island; 2978x – rest of the islands
- Area code: (+62) 773
- Registration plates: BP 1234 N×
- HDI (2020): ▲0.7275 High
- Website: natunakab.go.id

Natuna Regency is an islands regency located in the northernmost part of the Province of Riau Islands, Indonesia. This archipelago, with a land area of 1,983.90 km^{2} out of a total area of 264,198.37 km^{2} area, is divided into island clusters such as the Natuna Island Cluster and the Serasan Island Cluster. However, several other islands that are not located in the two clusters are spread over a wider area. This division reflects the geographical and administrative location of the district, but there are also other small islands that are outside these two main clusters and are not always included in the grouping. Administratively, this area is divided into 17 districts (kecamatan) which function to facilitate management and services for the local community and support the development of the potential of the region which is rich in natural resources and tourism. This regency also plays an important role in maintaining Indonesia's sovereignty in the northern border area, bordering on the South China Sea.

With 69,003 inhabitants at the 2010 Census and 81,495 at the 2020 Census, most of the population are Malays with 11% of Javanese migrants, Chinese, Minang, Batak, Banjar people, Dayak people, Buginese people, Sundanese people, and tiny percentage of migrants who come from Sulawesi, Bali, and other provinces across Indonesia. The official estimate as at mid 2025 was 84,910 (comprising 43,310 males and 41,600 females).

Some 80% of its inhabitants are of Malay origin, numerous being descended from Terengganuan, Johorean, and Pattanian descent as results of contact established since 1597. The consequence of this is the usage of Terengganuan Malay beside the Indonesian language as the official language and the Malay language as a lingua franca across the Province of Riau Islands.

Indonesia's exclusive economic zone (EEZ) off the coast of Natuna is slightly overlapped by China's widely disputed South China Sea claim.

== History ==
=== I-Tsing’s Notes ===
The discovery of the Natuna Islands by I-Tsing (or Yijing) has been disputed by some historians, who point to errors in interpreting his historical records. Although I-Tsing, a Buddhist monk from the Tang Dynasty, recorded his extensive travels through Southeast Asia and India, there is no strong evidence in his records that explicitly mentions the Natuna Islands. Many historians argue that I-Tsing only referred to the South Sea region in general, specifically Srivijaya (now Sumatra), as a center of Buddhist learning.

Most claims that I-Tsing discovered or mentioned Natuna come from misinterpretations of maps and documents related to the voyages of Chinese sailors such as Zheng He who came several centuries later. In his notes, I-Tsing emphasized his journey to India and his life in Srivijaya rather than exploring the sailing routes to specific islands.

Therefore, some critics suggest that the interpretation linking I-Tsing with the discovery of the Natuna Islands may be a historical misunderstanding. They point out that the shipping routes and records linking Natuna are more related to Persian ships and other sailors who had passed through the region long before I-Tsing.

=== Malay Sultanate Area ===
The most notable history of Natuna Islands followed upon the decision of Alauddin Riayat Shah III of Johor and the Green Queen of the Pattani Kingdom to claim Natuna Islands as part of their condominium. However, before the Sultan of Johor and the Pattani Monarch declared Natuna Islands as their condominium in 1597, its previous King, Alauddin Riayat II, created Datuk Kayas'/Dukes' titles as follows:

1. Datok Amar Lela for ruler of Jemaja Island
2. Datok Kaya Dewa Perkasa for ruler of Siantan Island
3. Datuk Kaya Indra Pahlawan for ruler of Serindit Island, (later known as Great Natuna Island)
4. Datuk Kaya Timbalan Siamah for ruler of Tambelan Islands.

=== Riau-Lingga Sultanate ===
The Natuna Islands had close ties with the Riau-Lingga Sultanate, especially after the partition of the old Johor Sultanate in the early 18th century. The Riau-Lingga Sultanate, established in 1824 after the Johor Sultanate collapsed due to Portuguese attacks and internal conflicts, controlled a vast territory, including the islands around the Straits of Malacca and the South China Sea, including the Natuna Islands.

The Riau-Lingga Sultanate played an important role in managing the waters and trade routes in the region. The influence of this kingdom was clearly visible in the political and economic management of the region, including in regulating shipping routes between the Malay Peninsula and the coastal areas of Sumatra and Borneo. During the Riau-Lingga Sultanate, the official administrative name for the Natuna Islands was Natuna Region or Pulau Natuna (in Malay it is called Pulau Natuna or Daerah Natuna ). During the heyday of the Riau-Lingga Sultanate, the influence of Malay culture was very pronounced in the Natuna Islands. The Natuna people, who were mostly of Malay ethnicity, had close ties with this kingdom in the social, cultural, and economic fields. In terms of economy, Natuna became a strategic place for the trade of spices, fish, and other seafood. In addition, the Riau-Lingga Sultanate also protected its territories from external threats, such as colonization by European powers, especially the Netherlands.

After the end of the Riau-Lingga Sultanate and the Dutch colonial influence in the region, the Natuna Islands remained an important part of Indonesia's maritime history. To this day, the historical and cultural heritage of the Riau-Lingga Sultanate is still very much felt in Natuna.

Throughout most of its history since the reigns of Sultanate of Riau-Lingga, the Natuna Islands were part of the Archipelago of Seven Islands/Pulau-pulau Tudjuh/Tujuh which were consisted of the Anambas Islands (currently a separated regency in the province), the Badas Islands (part of Island District of Tambelan in Bintan Regency), Great Natuna/Bunguran Islands, Sejang, Serasan Islands, Subi Islands, and Tambelan Archipelago (part of Bintan Regency). Although government of Kawedanan of Tudjuh Archipelago was dissolved in 1964, its island districts/kecamatan who formed Tudjuh Archipelago still existed until its dissolution in 1999, the sunrise of devolution era government in Indonesia.

=== Annexation Period by the Dutch East Indies ===
In the early 19th century, the Dutch further expanded their colonial power in the Indonesian archipelago, including the Natuna Islands. In The Anglo-Dutch Treaty of 1824 between the United Kingdom and the Netherlands, the two colonial powers divided their territories in Southeast Asia, with the Netherlands controlling the Indonesian archipelago and the UK controlling the Malay Peninsula. With this agreement, the Netherlands felt they had rights over areas in the Riau Islands, including Natuna.

However, due to its remote location and inaccessibility, the Dutch initially did not supervise the Natuna Islands directly. It was not until the mid-19th century that the Dutch East Indies began to explore the Natuna Islands further and officially annexed the islands into their colonial territory. The aim was to strengthen control in strategic waters and secure trade routes. The Dutch colonial government then designated Natuna as part of the Riau Residency under the supervision of the Riau Resident based in Tanjung Pinang.

During the Dutch colonial period, life in the Natuna Islands remained largely agrarian and simple. The Dutch did little infrastructure development in the area, although they often patrolled the border to maintain security.

=== Japanese Occupation Period (1942-1945) ===
When Japanese occupation of the Dutch East Indies during World War II in 1942-1945, the Natuna Islands were also under the control of the Japanese Empire. Japan saw Natuna as a strategic location for their military defense because of its location in the South China Sea. Therefore, Japan built several military bases on these islands as part of their defense plan in the Southeast Asia region.

The Japanese occupation brought many difficulties to the people of Natuna, because in addition to the heavy Japanese military presence, food was also difficult to obtain. After Japan surrendered in 1945, Indonesia proclaimed independence, but Natuna still had to face a complicated transition period as colonial rule ended.

=== Becoming Part of Indonesia ===
After the proclamation of Indonesian independence on August 17, 1945, the Natuna Islands became part of the newly independent Republic of Indonesia. Initially, Natuna was part of the Central Sumatra Province. However, due to its strategic position and location on the border of the South China Sea, the Indonesian government then decided to move the Natuna administration to Riau Province in 1957.

As Indonesia's territory expanded, in 2002 the Natuna Islands became part of the Riau Islands Province, after the province was formed as a separate province from Riau Province. The formation of the Riau Islands Province provided greater autonomy for border areas such as Natuna, as well as greater attention to infrastructure, economic and defense development.

== Geography ==
The Natuna Islands are a 272-island archipelago of Indonesia, located in the Natuna Sea between Peninsular Malaysia to the west and Borneo to the east. They extend in a NNW direction for 300 km from Tanjung Api, the northwest extremity of Kalimantan/Borneo. The Natuna Sea itself is a section of the South China Sea.

The North Group consists of a large island (Pulau Laut), two small islands and several adjacent islets and reefs which lie about 50 km NNW of Natuna Besar Island. Pulau Laut is about 11 km long with a greatest width of 5 km towards the south; it is generally hilly, rising to 273 metres near its north end.

The Middle Group consists of Natuna Besar or Bunguran Island, which contains the bulk of the area and population of the archipelago, together with small offshore islets and reefs; the Bodas Islands (Kepulauan Bodas) are a group of moderately high wooded islands lying close to the southwest coast of Natuna Besar, and are administratively classed as the districts of Pulau Tiga and Pulau Tiga Barat.

The Southern Group (Kepulauan Natuna Selatan) consists primarily of two groups of islands separated from the coast of Kalimantan by the Api Passage. The Subi Islands (Kepulauan Subi) of which the main islands are Subi Besar, Subi Kecil, Bakau, Panjang and Seraya, lie southeast of Natuna Besar. Serasan Island (Pulau Serasan) is the largest of the group of islands lying further to the southeast and nearer to Kalimantan, from which it is separated by the Serasan Strait. A third group - centred on Midai Island - lies to the west of the Subi Islands.

The highest point of the Bunguran Islands is Mount Ranai at 1,035 metres (3,396 ft). The islands had a population of 52,000 inhabitants according to the 2010 census; the estimated population in mid 2023 was about 64,250. The principal settlement is Ranai. The island can be reached by scheduled air services via Ranai Airport.

=== Natural resources ===
Natuna has large reserves of natural gas (estimated at 1.3 billion m^{3}) that is exported to neighbouring countries such as Singapore and Malaysia. Matak Island located in Anambas now functions as an offshore exploitation base.

=== Ecology ===
The Natuna Islands are part of the Borneo lowland rain forests ecoregion.

The Natuna Islands are home to a diverse population of avifauna, with 71 species of bird registered, including the near-threatened lesser fish eagle, the Natuna serpent-eagle. Other endangered species include the green iora, the brown fulvetta or the green broadbill.

The Natuna Islands is home to three species of non-human primates: the slow loris (Nycticebus coucang), the long-tailed macaque (Macaca fascicularis), and the Natuna leaf monkey (a.k.a. Natuna pale-thighed surili, Presbytis natunae). A small number of wild goats live on the island as well as sea birds. Over 360 species of bird have been recorded on the island.

Colourful coral reefs are found in the neighbouring waters. The Natuna banded leaf monkey, Presbytis natunae, is among the 25 most endangered primates on Earth.

== Government and politics ==
=== Administrative districts ===
As of 2010, the Regency was divided into twelve districts (kecamatan), but on 10 December 2014 three additional districts were created by dividing existing districts, and two further districts have subsequently been created by similar division. The seventeen districts are tabulated below from north to south with their areas and their populations at the 2010 census and the 2020 census, together with the official estimates as at mid 2025. The table also includes the location of the district administrative centres, the number of administrative villages (70 rural desa and 7 urban kelurahan) within each district and its postcodes.

Kode Wilayah	Name of District (kecamatan)	English name	Area in km^{2}	Pop'n 2010 census	Pop'n 2020 census	Pop'n mid 2025 estimate	Admin centre	No. of Villages	Post code	No. of Islands
21.03.10	Pulau Laut	(Laut Island)	37.61	2,169	2,319	2,360	Air Payang	3	29789	9
21.03.08	Bunguran Utara	(North Bunguran)	397.64	3,817	4,525	4,090	Kelarik	6	29775	14
21.03.24	Pulau Seluan	(Seluan Island)	7.17	^{(a)}	^{(a)}	850	Seluan	2	29775	1
21.03.15	Bunguran Timur Laut	(Northeast Bunguran)	298.96	4,306	5,372	5,810	Tanjung	7	29776	10
21.03.16	Bunguran Tengah	(Central Bunguran)	85.83	2,834	3,677	3,810	Harapan Jaya	3	29778	0
21.03.07	Bunguran Timur	(East Bunguran)	149.29	22,800	27,806	29,380	Ranai	7 ^{(b)}	29777	8
21.03.05	Bunguran Barat	(West Bunguran)	250.01	10,893	7,854	7,850	Sedanau	5	29782	15
21.03.20	Bunguran Batubi		216.15	^{(c)}	3,882	3,920	Batubi Jaya	5	29787	2
21.03.18	Bunguran Selatan	(South Bunguran)	234.04	2,537	3,349	3,580	Cemaga	4	29783	13
21.03.11	Pulau Tiga	(East Tiga Island)	41.74	4,826	3,727	3,930	Sabang Mawang Barat	6	29788	14
21.03.21	Pulau Tiga Barat	(West Tiga Island)	17.01	^{(d)}	2,109	2,360	Pulau Tiga	4	29786	4
21.03.04	Midai	(Midai Island)	13.80	5,007	3,604	3,440	Sabang Barat	3	29784	2
21.03.22	Suak Midai	(Midai Island)	12.34	^{(e)}	1,739	1,790	Batu Belanak	3	29785	0
21.03.09	Subi	(Subi Islands)	139.97	2,577	3,064	2,310	Subi	6	29779	24
21.03.23	Pulau Panjang	(Panjang Island)	7.59	^{(f)}	^{(f)}	860	Pulau Panjang	2	29779	2
21.03.06	Serasan	(West Serasan)	44.48	4,506	5,266	5,250	Serasan	7	29781	31
21.03.19	Serasan Timur	(East Serasan)	29.26	2,731	3,202	3,340	Arung Ayam	4	29780	10
21.03	Totals		1,983.90	69,003	81,495	84,910	Ranai	77		159

Notes: (a) the populations of the new Pulau Seluan District are included in the figures for Bunguran Utara District, from which it was split off in 2022.
(b) comprising 4 kelurahan (Bandarsyah, Batu Hitam, Ranai Darat and Ranai Kota) and 3 desa. (c) the 2010 population of the new Bunguran Batubi District is included in the figure for Bunguran Barat District, from which it was split off in 2014.
(d) the 2010 population of the new Pulau Tiga Barat District is included in the figure for Pulau Tiga District, from which it was split off in 2014.
(e) the 2010 population of the new Suak Midai District is included in the figure for Midai District, from which it was split off in 2014.
(f) the populations of the new Pulau Panjang District are included in the figures for Subi District, from which it was split off in 2022.

=== Maritime administration and Chinese claim ===
Indonesia's EEZ extends 200 nautical miles (370 km) from its shores (as per the 1982 UNCLOS), which, around Natuna, means it is slightly intersected by China's nine-dash line, defining its widely disputed claim to most of the South China Sea. In 2014–2015, the presence of the Indonesian National Armed Forces on the islands was reinforced, which the Indonesian government hoped would reduce the chance of any conflict. Then from late 2019, Chinese fishing vessels increased illegal activity within the EEZ, escorted by a Chinese Coast Guard vessel. Indonesia responded with a formal diplomatic protest to Beijing and then deployed to the region a further 600 troops and eight navy warships, along with aerial support. The naval presence included Ahmad Yani-class frigates, Bung Tomo-class corvettes, and Kapitan Pattimura-class ASW corvettes, while aerial support came from Naval aviation CN-235 MPA aircraft, four Indonesian Air Force F-16s and a Boeing 737-2x9, with BAE Hawk aircraft nearby on alert. A visit to the area by President Joko Widodo in early January 2020 reinforced Indonesia's resolve not to tolerate such incursions.

During a November 2024 state visit by Indonesian President Probowo Subianto to China, Indonesia and China signed a memorandum of understanding for "joint maritime development" in the area of the two countries "overlapping claims" near the Natuna Islands. Indonesia's Foreign Ministry subsequently issued a statement that the memorandum did not impact Indonesia's sovereignty or rights in the area and stating that in Indonesia's view the Chinese claims do not have a legal basis. Critics of the memorandum who were quoted by the South China Morning Post contended that the wording could support China's position regarding the South China Sea claims.

== Economy ==
Natuna Regency has great economic potential, especially in the marine, fisheries, and marine tourism sectors which are rich in natural beauty, such as beaches, coral reefs, and marine biodiversity. This potential can be the main source of regional income and create jobs for the local community. However, economic development in Natuna Regency faces challenges in infrastructure and inter-island connectivity as well as accessibility to other regions, which are still limited and affect the distribution of goods and public services. Therefore, the development of infrastructure such as ports, small airports, and adequate transportation routes is urgently needed to improve connectivity and accelerate regional economic development. In addition, to reduce dependence on natural resources and maintain long-term economic stability, diversification efforts into more sustainable sectors are needed. Increasing human resource capacity through training in the fisheries, tourism, and marine product processing sectors is also an important step to increase regional competitiveness and support the welfare of the Natuna community in a sustainable manner.

== Demographics ==
Religion in Natuna Regency (2023)
religion	percent
Islam	97.11%
Protestantism	1.39%
Buddhism	0.99%
Roman Catholicism	0.37%
Confucianism	0.14%

=== Peoples ===
According to the 2010 census returns (released in 2011), the population of the islands stood at 69,003 people. 85.27% of the inhabitants were Malays, with the remainder consisting of Javanese, Sumatrans and Chinese. By the 2020 census, this had grown to 81,495, and by mid 2023 it had grown to 83,668.

=== Religion ===
Islam is the dominant religion in the islands, with 96.97% of the total population identifying themselves as Muslim. Other religions are Christianity, which forms 1.66% of the total population, Buddhism, which forms 1.23% of the total population, and Confucianism, which forms 0.14% of the total population. The largest mosque is located in the north-east corner of the islands. The Masjid Agung Natuna was built over two years from 2007 to 2009, and is visited by at least 10,000 people every day.

== Transportation ==
=== Harbors and airports ===
The military harbour was headquartered on Teuku Umar for Navy ships tasked on the Natuna Sea.

Ranai-Natuna Airport is located at Ranai, the capital city of Natuna Regency. The airport is also a Type B airbase of the Indonesian Air Force. Other than that, the airport also serves civilian flights. The airport also accommodates large military aircraft. A new passenger terminal opened in October 2016, inaugurated by President Joko Widodo.

The airport resides at an elevation of 2 metres (6 ft 7 in) above mean sea level. It has one runway designated 18/36 with an asphalt surface measuring 2,560 m × 32 m (8,399 ft × 105 ft). The runway is planned to be widened to 80 m in 2020. Moreover, the airport has an apron measuring 120 m × 60 m and a taxiway measuring 50 m × 32 m.

The recently built terminal at the airport has an area of 3,868 m^{2}, many times larger than the old terminal which only had an area of 243 m^{2}. The new terminal can accommodate around 13,850 passengers daily. The parking lot has been expanded to 5,020 m^{2} and can now cater to around 3,940 cars and 750 motorcycles. Other facilities inside the airport are the Aviation Accidents Rescue and Fire Fighting building, a generator and the pump house.

== See also ==
- Anambas Islands
- Badas Islands
- Tambelan archipelago
