= Natuna Sea =

Marginal sea of the Pacific Ocean

- Laut Natuna (Indonesian)
- Natuna Sea in the Riau Islands Natuna Sea in Indonesia

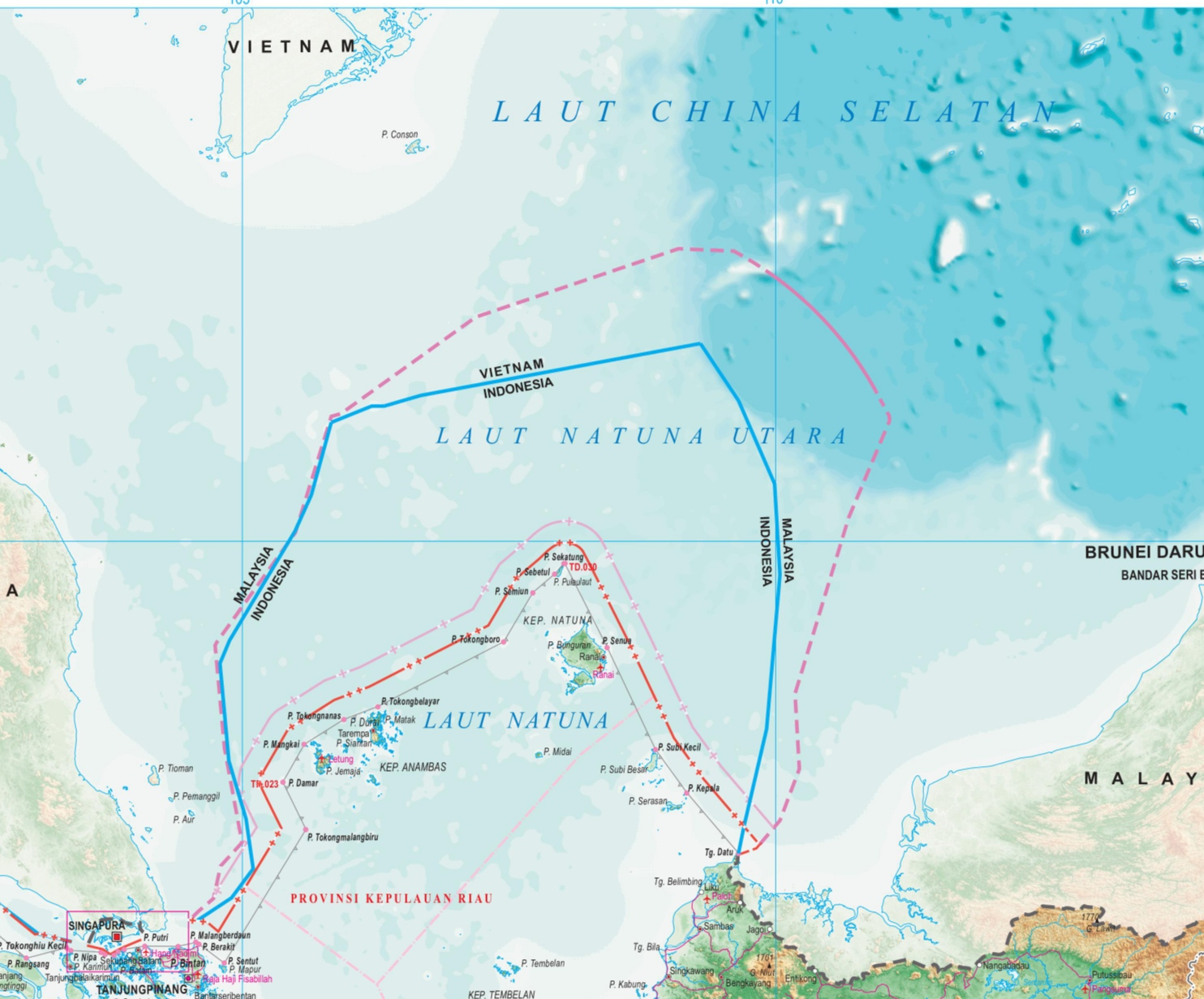
- Natuna and North Natuna Sea
- Coordinates: 1°N 107°E
- Type: Sea
- Basin countries: Indonesia

The Natuna Sea (Indonesian: Laut Natuna) is an extensive shallow sea located around the Natuna Regency, extending south of the Riau Islands, east of the Lingga Regency and west of Borneo, to the Bangka Belitung Islands. The islands of the Badas and Tambelan Archipelago are located at its center. Mostly located within Indonesian territorial waters, it is the southernmost portion of the South China Sea, and geologically part of Sunda Shelf. It communicates with the Java Sea to its southeast via the Karimata and Gaspar Strait east and west of Belitung, and with the Strait of Malacca to the west via the Berhala and Singapore Strait.

The International Hydrographic Organization (IHO), in its Limits of Oceans and Seas, 3rd edition (1953), does not list a Natuna Sea. Instead, the area encompassed by the Natuna Sea is considered the southern portion of the South China Sea. The 1986 draft of the IHO's Limits of Oceans and Seas proposed the Natuna Sea, which extends south from the Natuna and Anambas Islands to the Belitung Islands.

== North Natuna Sea ==
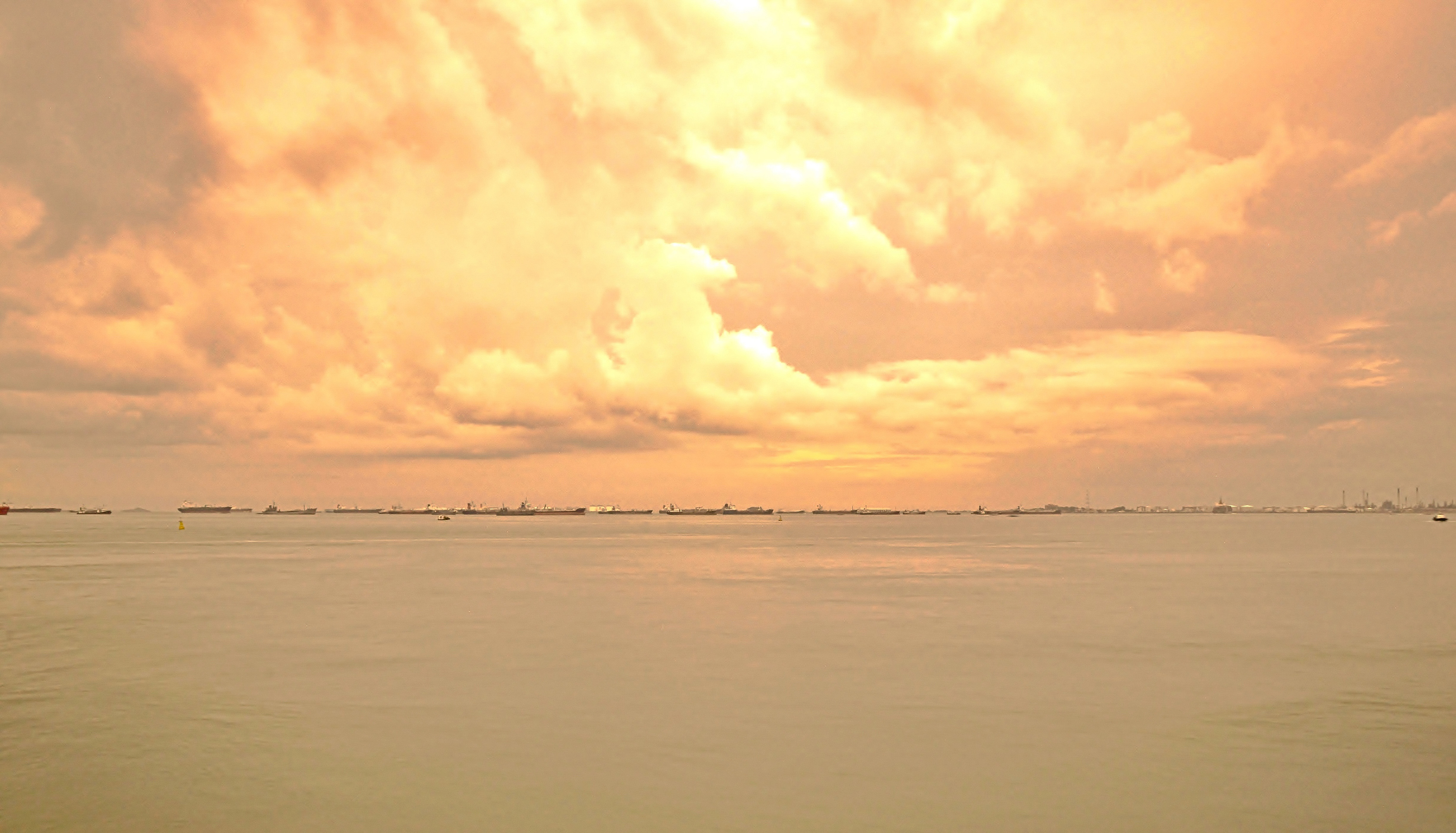
Natuna Sea

In July 2017, Indonesia renamed the northern reaches of its exclusive economic zone in the South China Sea as the "North Natuna Sea", which is located north of the Indonesian Natuna Regency, bordering southern Vietnam's exclusive economic zone. The North Natuna Sea is located between the Natuna Islands and Cape Cà Mau on the southern tip of the Mekong Delta in Vietnam.

== See also ==
- West Philippine Sea
