= Henhoaha =

- village
- Location in Andaman and Nicobar Islands, India Henhoaha (India)
- Coordinates: 6.780621°N 93.8258513°E
- Country: India
- State: Andaman and Nicobar Islands
- District: Nicobar
- Tehsil: Great Nicobar
- Elevation: 47 m (154 ft)

Population (2011)
  - Total: 0
- Time zone: UTC+5:30 (IST)
- 2011 census code: 645188

Henhoaha is a village in the Nicobar district of Andaman and Nicobar Islands, India. It is located on the island of Great Nicobar, near Indira Point, the southernmost point of India.

== Administration ==
The village comes under the administration of Laxmi Nagar panchayat.

== Demographics ==
The village lost a number of its residents in the 2004 tsunami. According to the 2011 census of India, Henhoaha (or In-Hig-Loi) does not have any households and is uninhabited.

Demographics (2011 Census)
	Total	Male	Female
Population	0	0	0
