= Joginder Nagar, Great Nicobar =

Joginder Nagar
- village
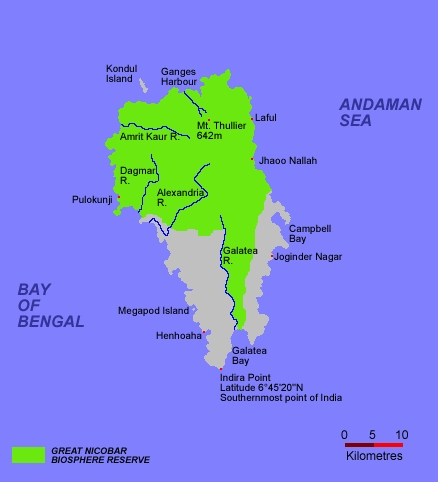
- Campbell Bay is located in the eastern part of the Great Nicobar Island

- Location in India
- Coordinates: 6.94°N 93.91°E
- Country: India
- State: Andaman and Nicobar Islands
- District: Nicobar
- Tehsil: Great Nicobar

Population (2011)
  - Total: 693
- Time zone: UTC+5:30 (IST)
- 2011 census code: 645195

Joginder Nagar is a village in the Nicobar district of Andaman and Nicobar Islands, India. It is located in the Great Nicobar tehsil.

Joginder Nagar and Laxmi Nagar were originally Shompen camping sites. The Shompens deserted the place when forests were cleared to make way for a village of ex-servicemen.

== Demographics ==
According to the 2011 census of India, Joginder Nagar has 208 households. The effective literacy rate (i.e. the literacy rate of population excluding children aged 6 and below) is 76.65%.

Demographics (2011 Census)
	Total	Male	Female
Population	693	401	292
Children aged below 6 years	55	28	27
Scheduled caste	0	0	0
Scheduled tribe	0	0	0
Literates	489	297	192
Workers (all)	334	284	50
Main workers (total)	279	238	41
Main workers: Cultivators	24	21	3
Main workers: Agricultural labourers	0	0	0
Main workers: Household industry workers	1	1	0
Main workers: Other	254	216	38
Marginal workers (total)	55	46	9
Marginal workers: Cultivators	24	19	5
Marginal workers: Agricultural labourers	9	8	1
Marginal workers: Household industry workers	7	5	2
Marginal workers: Others	15	14	1
Non-workers	359	117	242

== See also ==
- Kanyakumari
- Indira Point
- List of extreme points of India
- Extreme points of Indonesia
