= Exclusive economic zone of India =

Economic zone exclusive to India

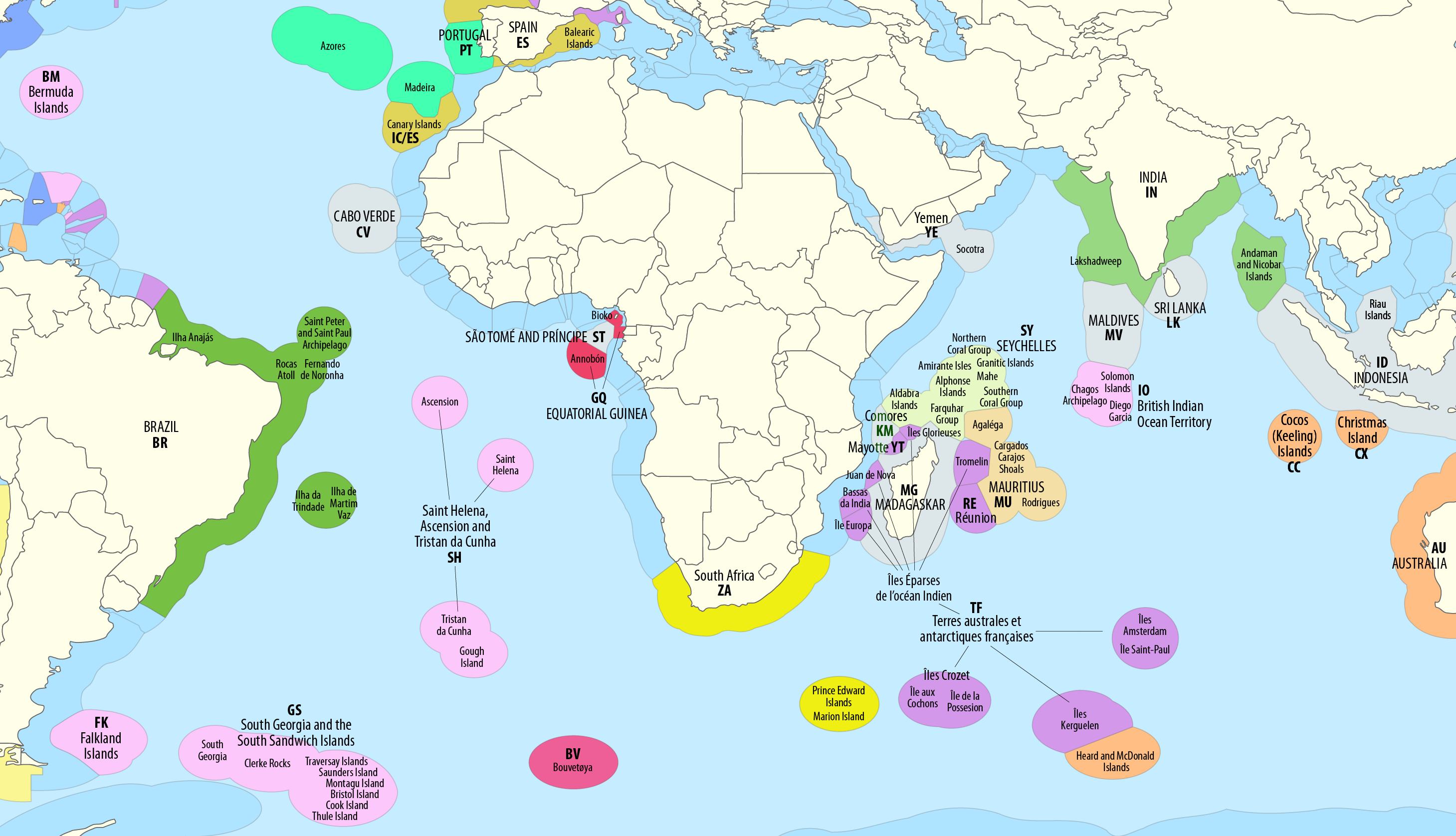
EEZs in the Atlantic and Indian Oceans.

India has the 18th-largest exclusive economic zone (EEZ) with a total size of 2,305,143 km^{2} (890,021 sq mi). It includes the Lakshadweep island group in the Laccadive Sea off the southwestern coast of India and the Andaman and Nicobar Islands in the Bay of Bengal and the Andaman Sea. India's EEZ is bordered to the west by Pakistan, to the south by the Maldives and Sri Lanka and to the east by Bangladesh, Myanmar, Thailand, Malaysia and Indonesia. Based on new scientific data, India has petitioned United Nations to extend its EEZ from 200 Nautical miles to 350 nautical miles.

== Historic context ==
Historic Greater India zone and expansion of Indian-origin polities and religions (Hinduism, Buddhism, Jainism, and Sikhism).

== Legal framework ==
India legally defined the concept of EEZ in the "Territorial Waters, Continental Shelf, Exclusive Economic Zone and Other Maritime Zones Act, 1976". In June 1997, India also ratified UNCLOS. India also enacted the "Maritime Zones of India (Regulation of fishing by foreign vessels) Act, 1981" prohibiting fishing by foreign vessel within Indian EEZ without a license. Additionally, India has also enacted laws regulation the fishing and fisheries by Indian fishing vessels operating in the EEZ.

== Importance of EEZ ==
Greater India: Conceptually related to EEZ, the historic Indian cultural influence expanded across Southeast Asia through numerous Indianized Hindu-Buddhist kingdoms along the Maritime Silk Route, such as in Indonesia and Malaysia (Srivijaya, Majapahit, Kalingga, Kutai, Singhasari, Tarumanagara, Pan Pan, Gangga Negara and Langkasuka), Indochina (Champa, Funan, and Chenla), Thailand (Dvaravati), and Myanmar (Pagan).

=== Economic importance ===
An EEZ provides a nation greater access to oil, natural gas, minerals, commercial fishing and other marine resources, freedom of navigation, international trade, national security, and strategic leverage over other nations. With 7,500 km coastline and an EEZ of over 2.3 million km^{2}, India has exclusive control over the resources in its EEZ including navigation of seafaring trade and transport vessels in this area. As per 2014 study, India exploits only 3.2 million tonnes per year marine fishery resources out of potential 3.92 million tonne in its coastal areas.

=== Regional maritime security ===
Piracy, poaching or illegal fishing by foreign vessels, freedom of navigation, transgression of foreign vessels into Indian EEZ, and conflicting claims are major issues in EEZ. Piracy in the Strait of Malacca is a major concern for all the nations. Studies have shown decline in fishing stocks and destruction of several marine ecological areas in Indian EEZ due to organized illegal poaching and fishing resulting in depletion of many endangered and threatened species. Freedom of the navigation has become a cause of concern due to piracy. National security is also threatened by actions of China around Indian EEZ. Conflicting claims over EEZ by nations leads to disputes, such as India-Pakistan Sir Creek dispute. In the past, UNCLOS has granted several contradicting claims while increasing the EEZ based on the evidence related to the length of continental shelf. These UNCLOS contradictions have resulted into overlapping EEZ claims by several nations competing for the resources in the expanded EEZ.

=== National security and geostrategy ===
The Indian Coast Guard near the shore and the Indian Military's integrated Andaman and Nicobar Command off-shore play the important role in protecting India's EEZ while exercising control over the geostratgically important channels in Bay of Bengal and the important international chokepoint of Strait of Malacca.

== India's EEZ ==
=== India's existing EEZ area ===
| EEZ | Area (km^{2} / mi^{2}) |
|---|---|
| Mainland India and Lakshadweep | 1,641,514 square kilometres (633,792 sq mi) |
| Andaman and Nicobar Islands | 663,629 square kilometres (256,229 sq mi) |
| Total | 2,305,143 square kilometres (890,021 sq mi) |

=== India's increased EEZ claim area ===
==== Summary of new claims ====
| Area | Additional Claim Area (km^{2} / mi^{2}) |
|---|---|
| Arabian Sea | 1,200,000 square kilometres (460,000 sq mi) |
| Bay of Bengal and Indian Ocean | 300,000 square kilometres (120,000 sq mi) |
| Total | 1,500,000 square kilometres (580,000 sq mi) |

==== Arabia Sea - India's 2025 revised new claims under review by CLCS ====
As of early 2026, India is actively pursuing an expanded maritime claim, specifically focusing on its Extended Continental Shelf (ECS) in the Central Arabian Sea. The new claims are based on updated technical data from India's National Centre for Polar and Ocean Research (NCPOR), providing evidence that the seabed is a natural prolongation of India's landmass. In April 2025, after India's original 2009 claim was rejected by the Convention on the Continental Shelf (CLCS) in March 2023 due to objections from Pakistan regarding the Sir Creek area, India submitted revised partial claims for the Central Arabian Sea by splitting its submission to isolate disputed Sir Creek areas from uncontested ones, allowing the CLCS to review in the 64th CLCS session (August 2025), with ongoing consultations likely extending into 2026. If accepted, this extension, combined with the 2 million km^{2} EEZ, would give India control over a total seabed area of roughly 3.2 million km^{2}, nearly equal to its total landmass. In the Sir Creek dispute Pakistan objects to India's EEZ claims in the Western Arabian Sea, resulting in an EEZ claim overlap of 100 nautical miles. If granted, the total seabed area under Indian jurisdiction would nearly equal its terrestrial landmass, providing exclusive rights to explore polymetallic nodules and hydrocarbons.

==== Bay of Bengal and the Indian Ocean - India's 2025 revised new claims under review by CLCS ====
India has also claimed additional 300,000 square km in the Bay of Bengal and the Indian Ocean, which are under evaluation.

==== 2009-2010 claims by India - rejected by CLCS in March 2023 due to objections by Pakistan ====
Earlier in 2009-2010, based on the new 6,000 pages sedimentary and scientific evidence, India petitioned United Nations for increasing Indian EEZ from 200 nautical miles to 350 nautical miles. Extension of EEZ from 200 to 350 nautical mile will almost double India's present EEZ. UNCLOS permits extension of EEZ beyond the usual 200 nautical miles limit, to a maximum of 350 nautical miles, if the evidence shows that continental shelf extends beyond 200 nautical miles. For the integrated management and mapping of the EEZ, India's Ministry of Earth Sciences (MoES) initiated an ongoing project in 1999 which was only 30% complete in 2018. A team of 60 scientists from several national institutes began undertaking multi-disciplinary studies on geo-scientific mapping, physiography, sedimentology, paleoclimatology and Himalayan tectonics, hydrology of India and monsoon of South Asia, mineral resource availability. Scientists and researchers involved in the studies come from several institutes and universities, such as the National Centre for Polar and Ocean Research (NCPOR), National Institute of Oceanography, India (NIO), National Institute of Ocean Technology (NIOT), Geological Survey of India (GSI) and many universities. These studies also enhance the preparedness against environmental hazards and socio-economic well-being of people living in Coastal India.

== Neighbouring EEZs ==
Neighbouring EEZ of other nations from west to east are:

| EEZ | Dispute (Y/N) | Distance | Comments |
|---|---|---|---|
| Pakistan | Yes | Contiguous | Sir Creek dispute |
| Maldives | No | Contiguous | Resolved under India–Maldives maritime treaty, and both agreed that Minicoy Island will remain part of India. |
| Sri Lanka | No | Contiguous | Resolved under Indo-Sri Lankan Maritime agreements. Sri Lanka's Katchatheevu island on Ram Setu is the nearest Island to Indian part of Ram Setu. |
| Bangladesh | No | Contiguous . | Resolved through India–Bangladesh maritime arbitration. Saint Martin's Island, a small coral island in the north-eastern part of the Bay of Bengal, about 9 km south of the tip of the Cox's Bazar is nearest Bangladeshi island to India's Mizoram. |
| Myanmar | No | Contiguous. | India's Landfall Island is 40 km from Myanmar's Coco Islands. India is developing Myanmar's strategic Sittwe Port as part of Kaladan Multi-Modal Transit Transport Project. See also India–Myanmar maritime boundary. |
| Indonesia | No | Contiguous. | India's southernmost territory Indira Point is 135 km north of Indonesia's northernmost territory Rondo Island. India is developing Indonesia's Sabang deepsea port under strategic economic and military partnership. |
| Thailand | No | Contiguous. | Thailand has treaty-defined maritime boundaries with India, Myanmar, Indonesia and Malaysia. India's Tillangchong island north of Camorta Island in Nicobar is 440 km from Thailand's Ko Huyong in Similan Islands group). India's Campbell Bay on Great Nicobar Island is 488 km from Thailand's Ko Racha Noi (Ko Raya Noi) island in Phuket Province. |
| Malaysia | No | Not applicable as India and Malaysia do not share any EEZ boundary. | India's Campbell Bay on Great Nicobar Island is 630 km from Malaysia's nearest island Langkawi in Strait of Malacca choke point. |

== Gallery ==
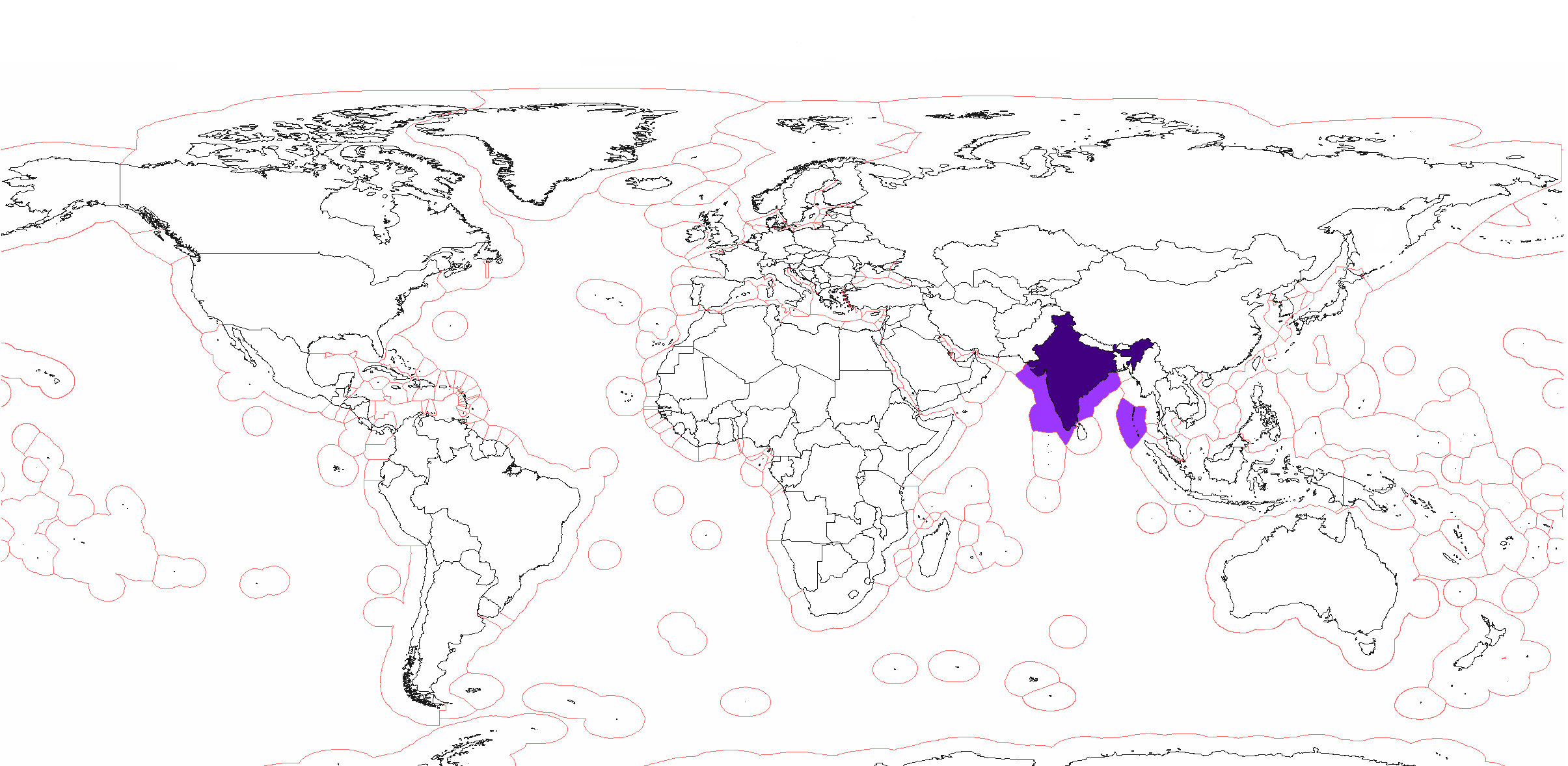
Indian EEZ.

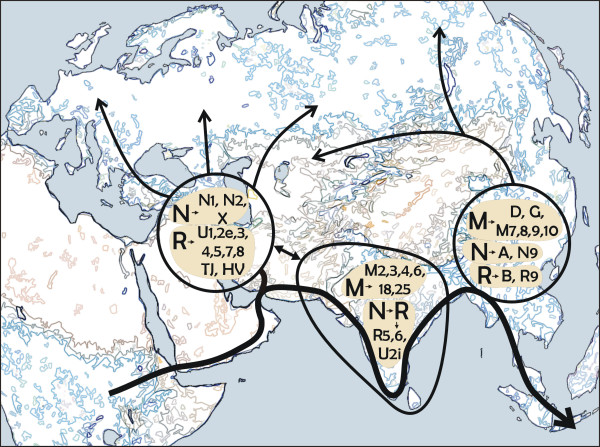
According to the Coastal hypothesis, early modern humans spread from Africa along the northern rim of the Indian Ocean.

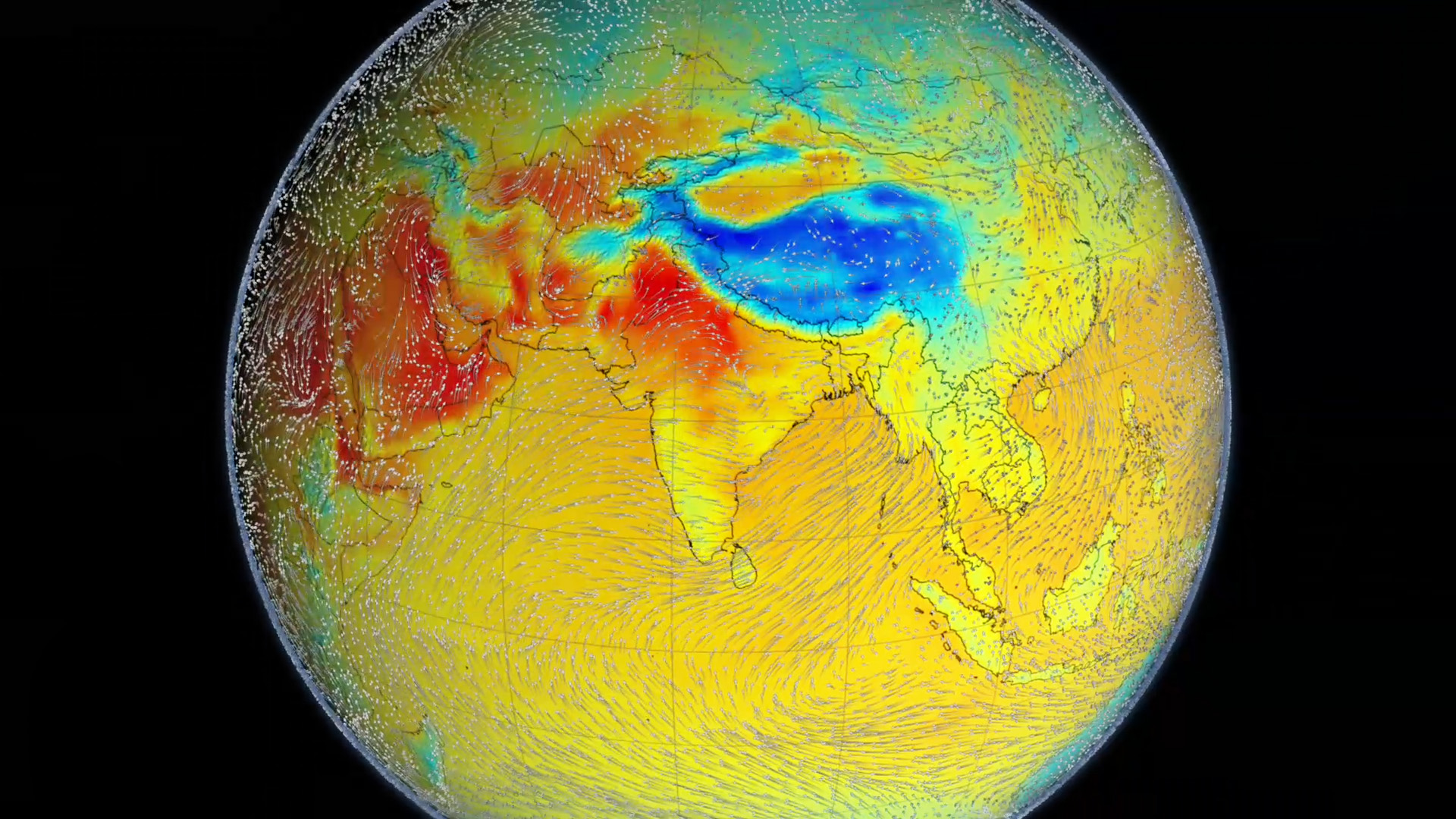
During summer, warm continental masses draw moist air from the Indian Ocean, producing heavy rainfall. The process is reversed during winter, resulting in dry conditions.

== See also ==
- Climate of India
- Borders of India
- Disputed territories of India
- Extreme points of India
- Geography of India
- Outline of India
