= National Shipping Board =

Indian Government agency

- Emblem of India

Agency overview
- Jurisdiction: India
- Headquarters: Parivahan Bhavan 1, Parliament Street New Delhi
- Minister responsible: Mansukh L. Mandaviya; Minister of State for Ports, Shipping and Waterways
- Agency executive: Dr. Malini V. Shankar(IAS)
- Website: nsb.nic.in

The National Shipping Board is an Advisory Body on matters related to shipping and shipping infrastructure (ports). As India gained its independence in 1947 shipping had become very important for the growth of India as the Shipping Laws were created by old British law it had to be revised and in 1958 when the Merchant Shipping Law was consolidated and the opportunity was taken to provide for the formation of a Permanent statutory body called the National Shipping Board. The National Shipping Board was established on 1 March 1959.The Body was established by a recommendation to the Reconstruction Policy Sub-Committee as early as 1947. It comes under the Ministry of Ports, Shipping and Waterways (India), it looks into matters related to Indian Shipping.The National Shipping Board members are elected/nominated by Parliament, Lok Sabha (lower house of parliament and Rajya Sabha (upper house of Parliament). The National Maritime Agenda 2010-2020 is an initiative of the Ministry of Ports, Shipping and Waterways & The National Shipping Board to outline the framework for the development of the port sector. The agenda also suggests policy-related initiatives to improve the operating efficiency and competitiveness of the Ports in India.

== Societies and associations ==
- Indian Maritime University
- Indian Ports Association
- Seafarers Welfare Fund Society

== PSUs it works with ==
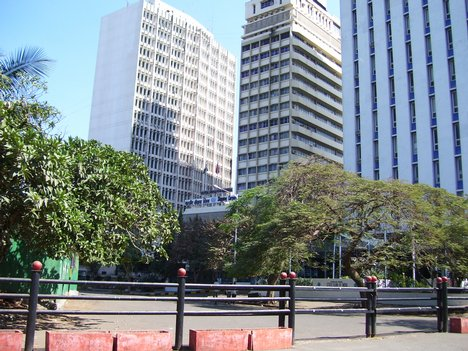
Shipping Corporation of India, Mumbai HQ

- Shipping Corporation of India, Mumbai
- Cochin Shipyard Limited, Cochin
- Central Inland Water Transport Corporation Limited
- Dredging Corporation of India Limited
- Hooghly Dock & Ports Engineers Limited
- Ennore Port Limited
- Sethusamundaram Corporation Limited

== Market size ==
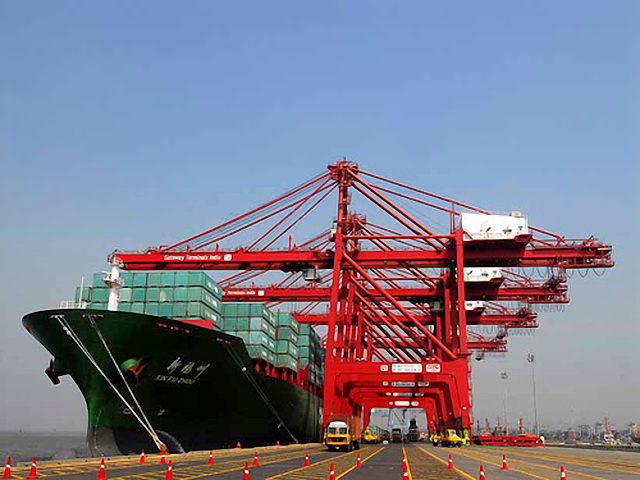
Jawaharlal Nehru Trust Port

Cargo traffic of Indian ports were 911.5 MT for FY12, and is projected to be around 1,758 MT for FY17. During April–May 2014 ports handled 95.87 MT of cargo as compared to 91.48 MT during April–May 2013, an increase of 4.8%, according to the data released by Indian Ports Association (IPA).

== Investments ==
The Indian ports sector received FDI worth US$1,635.40 million between April 2000 and May 2014, according to the Department of Industrial Policy and Promotion (DIPP), Ministry of Commerce and Industry.

== Government initiatives ==
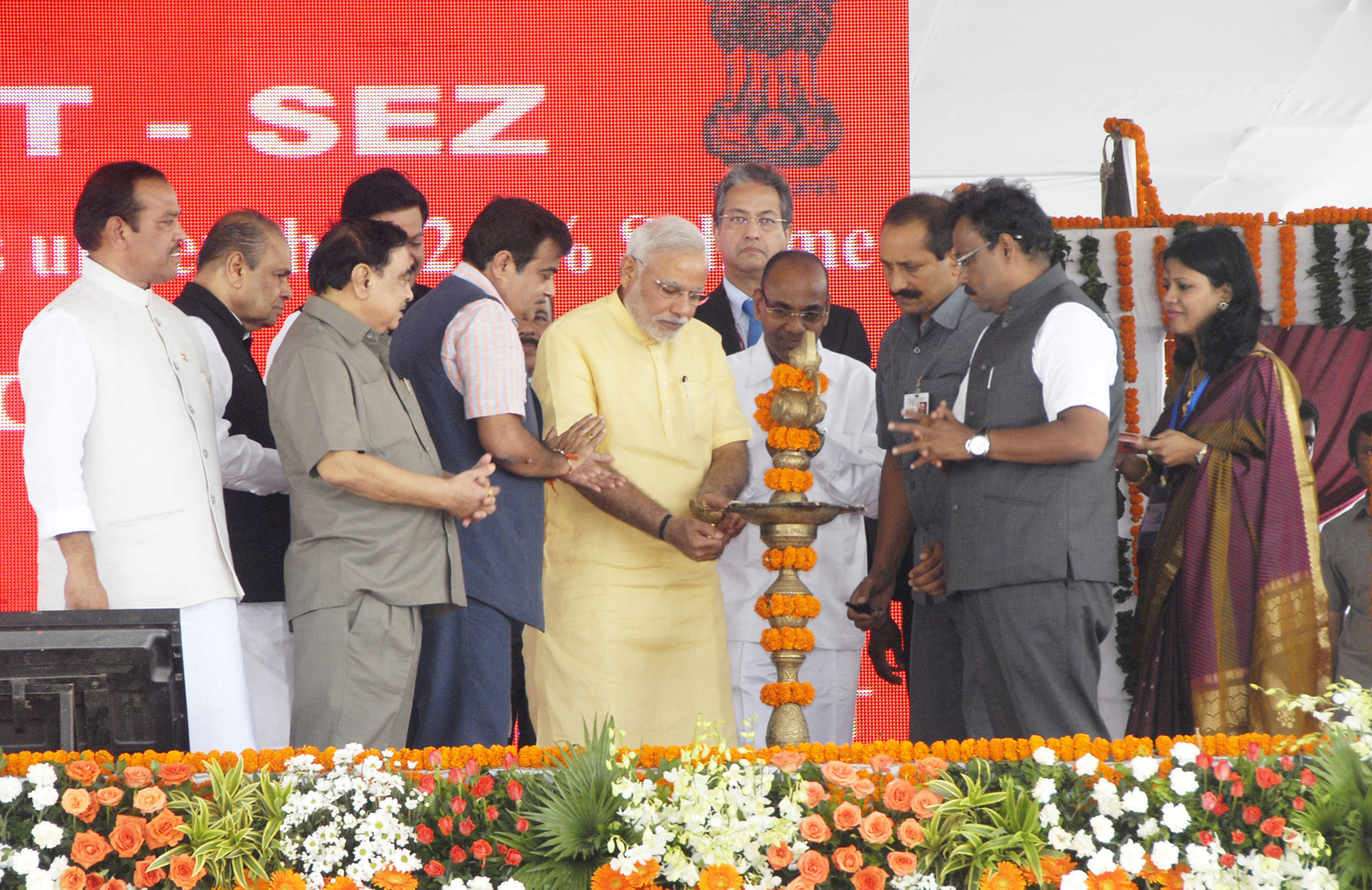
PM Modi lays the foundation stone of the Jawaharlal Nehru Port Trust Special Economic Zone, at Sheva in Navi Mumbai

The Government has allowed FDI up to 100% under the projects related to the construction and maintenance of ports and harbours. A 10-year tax exemption has been given to the enterprises engaged in the business of developing, maintaining and operating ports, inland waterways and inland ports.

== Ports in India ==
India has a coastline spanning 7516.6 kilometers, forming one of the biggest peninsulas in the world. It is serviced by 13 major ports, 200 notified minor and intermediate ports. The total 200 non-major ports are in the following States:- Gujarat (42); Maharashtra (48); Tamil Nadu (15); Karnataka (10); Kerala (17); Andhra Pradesh (12); Odisha (13); Goa (5); West Bengal (1); Daman and Diu (2); Lakshadweep (10); Pondicherry (2); and Andaman & Nicobar (23).

Government of India plans to modernise these ports and has approved a project called Sagarmala.

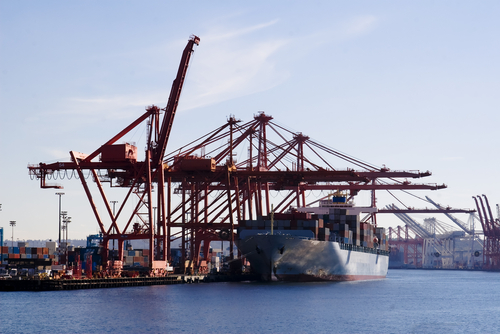
Adani Mundra Port Kutch Gujarat

== See also ==
- Borders of India
- Climate of India
- Coastal India
- Exclusive economic zone of India
- Fishing in India
- Outline of India
