= Exclusive economic zone of Bangladesh =

The Exclusive Economic Zone of Bangladesh is a maritime area extending from the baseline of Bangladesh's coast outwards up to 200 nautical miles into the Bay of Bengal. It is recognized under the United Nations Convention on the Law of the Sea (UNCLOS). Bangladesh's EEZ is bordered by India and Myanmar. After resolving maritime boundary disputes with neighbouring countries, the confirmed maritime area of Bangladesh, including the territorial sea, EEZ, and continental shelf, is around 207,000 sq kilometers of which the EEZ constitutes an estimated 166,000 sq kilometres.

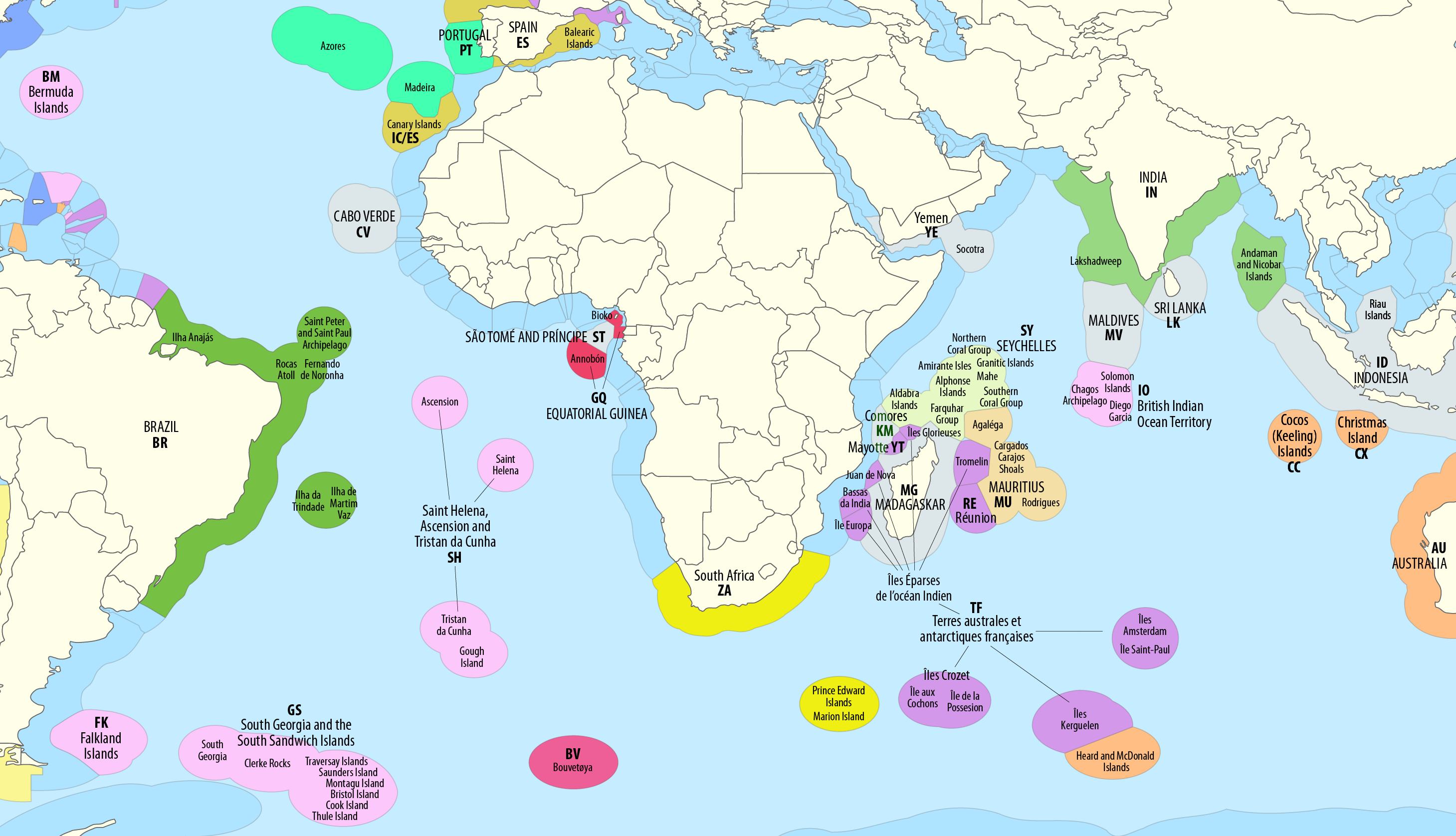
EEZs in the Atlantic and Indian Oceans

== See also ==
- Exclusive economic zone of India
- Exclusive economic zone of Pakistan
