= Rondo Island =

Northernmost island in Indonesia

Rondo
Native name: Pulo Rondo
- Location within Bay of Bengal Location within Indonesia

Geography
- Coordinates: 6°4′30″N 95°6′45″E

Administration
- Indonesia
- Region: Sumatra
- Province: Aceh

Rondo Island (Indonesian: Pulau Rondo; Acehnese: Pulo Rondo) is Indonesia's northernmost territory, located in the Andaman Sea, with a 0.650 km^{2} area 35m above sea level. The island is one of the outlying islands of Indonesia in the Aceh province of the Sumatra region. It is administratively part of the Sukakarya District in Sabang City, whose administration center is on Weh Island, south of Rondo. Rondo is 50 km offshore from Indonesia's Sumatra mainland. This otherwise uninhabited island, accessible only by boat, has an Indonesian military outpost with a heliport and blue-roofed barracks, an adjacent lighthouse complex with a red-roofed lighthouse keeper's house and a white skeletal lighthouse topped with a viewing gallery and lantern.

India's southernmost territory (Indira Point) on Great Nicobar Island of the Nicobar Islands is approximately 84 miles or 135 km to the north from the Indonesia's northernmost territory on Rondo Island. Centered 21 km or 13 miles northwest of Rondo, between Indonesia and India, is a submerged sandy and rocky coral shoal with a minimum depth of 51m. The island is surrounded by a mile (1.7 km) wide reef which has a steep marine slope on its edges. On the southern edge of island's reef are 14 small rocky islets, at distances between 0.9 and 1.7 km. Between these islets and Weh Island is a 16–20 km or 3-3.5 leagues wide safe navigable channel. Before the advent of modern shipping, shipping between Rondo and Weh Islands was considered safer due to calmer seas.

Rondo island, nicknamed "Guardian of Indonesia", borders exclusive economic zones of India and Thailand, and lies on a strategically important shipping route where commercial shipping vessels to and from the Indian Ocean pass north of Rondo. India and Indonesia are upgrading the Sabang deepsea port under the strategic economic and military partnership to enhance the regional connectivity, safety, security, and to protect the Andaman Sea and Strait of Malacca channel between Great Nicobar Island and Rondo Island (c. 2019). The area around Rondo Island is known for the threat of piracy.

== History ==
Fei Xin (1385 – after 1436), a military man from the fleet of the Ming admiral Zheng He, in his book on countries visited by Chinese ships described an island in the middle of an important shipping route where north Sumatran natives in dugout canoes traded precious stones, Spittle Perfume (ambergris), coconuts, bananas and fish organs with sailors in exchange for gold coins. He described the native religion of the region as Buddhist, and mentioned the island's Buddhist temple and rock with a 3 ft-long footprint of Buddha. He described the habits and customs of the natives as liberal and simple but rich in form. Both women and men shaved their heads and covered their bodies with leaves instead of clothes. "Lung-Hsien-Hsu" was the Chinese name of the island, which has been identified with Rondo, Weh and Breueh Island in the ocean of Lambri (an Indianised north Sumatran kingdom from Srivijaya era) and Lemuria (hypothetical lost land with an ancient Tamil civilization).

A 1698–1700 CE journal of the first French embassy to China also documents Rondo island as a stop en route to China.

Danish shipliner Maersk's largest cargo ship ran aground off Rondo island on January 6, 1922, and was a total loss.

== Ecology ==
The topography of the half sphere shaped island, with a somewhat flattened top, is wooded and steepest on its north side. The island is completely covered in tropical rainforest. The fauna includes many species of snakes. The region around the island is rich in marine habitats.

== Tourism ==
The island is popular with scuba divers. Sailboats can anchor at a depth of 14 m between northwest to southwest off the island only during northeast monsoon. Strong rip tides around the island extend up to 32 km or 20 miles west to northwest.

== See also ==
- Exclusive economic zone of Indonesia
- Exclusive economic zone of India
- Sabang, Aceh, An Indonesian port on Weh Island being developed in partnership with India
- Sittwe Port, Myanmar's miltimodel port being developed by India
- Indira Point, India's southernmost point of Andaman and Nicobar Islands group is just north of Rondo Island
- Landfall Island, India's northernmost island of Andaman and Nicobar Islands group
- India's Look-East Connectivity projects
- Extreme points of India
- Extreme points of Indonesia
- List of beaches in Indonesia
