= Exclusive economic zone of Sri Lanka =

Economic zone exclusive to Sri Lanka

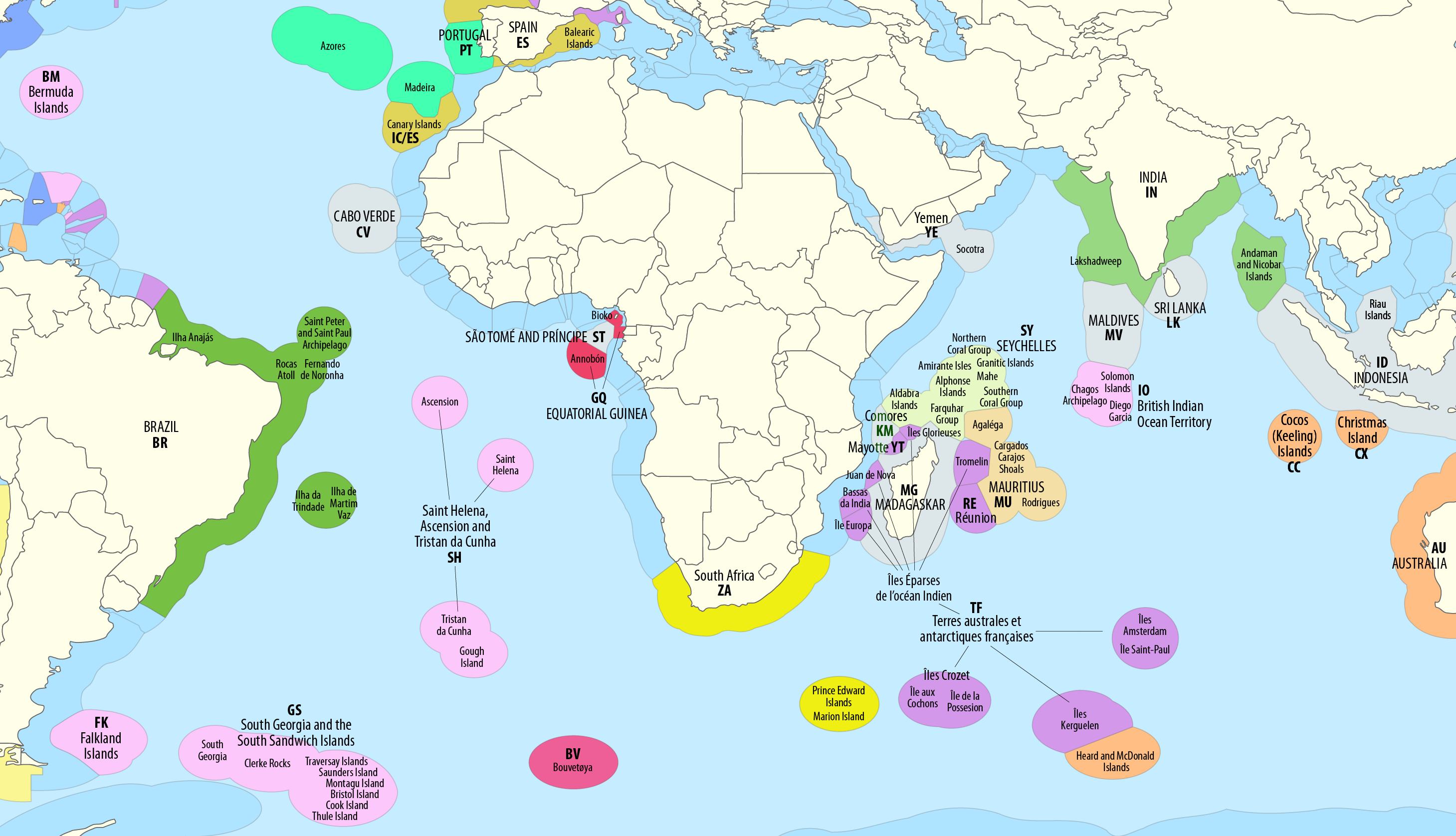
EEZs in the Atlantic and Indian Oceans

Sri Lanka is ranked 51st in size of its exclusive economic zone (EEZ) with a total size of 532,619 km^{2} (205,645 sq mi). Sri Lanka's EEZ is bordered to the north and west by India in the Gulf of Mannar and Bay of Bengal; as well as in the west by the Maldives in Laccadive Sea.

== Legal framework ==
In 1976, Sri Lanka legally defined the concept of EEZ in the "Maritime Zones Law, No. 22 of 1976".

== Treaties ==
Ceylon participated in the First Conference on the Law of the Sea (UNCLOS I) in 1958 and ratified the following conventions.

1. The convention of the High Seas
2. The contention of the territorial sea and the contiguous zone.
3. The convention on the Continental Shelf.
4. The convention on the living resources of the High Seas.

Between 1974 and 1976, the India–Sri Lanka maritime boundary agreements were signed and defined the international maritime boundary between the two countries. In 1982, Sri Lanka was an active member in the third Third United Nations Conference on the Law of the Sea (UNCLOS III) proclaiming her Maritime Zones. Sri Lanka has petitioned the United Nations based on scientific and other data to extend its EEZ beyond the current 200 Nautical miles.

== Enforcement ==
The Sri Lanka Navy and since its establishment in 1999 the Sri Lanka Coast Guard have been tasked with patrolling the maritime zones to prevent illegal activity.

=== Poaching by Indian fishmen ===
Indian fishermen from Tamil Nadu have been accused by the Sri Lankan fishing community of poaching within the EEZ, claiming that Tamil Nadu fishermen have been engaged in bottom trawling which has been banned in Sri Lanka since 2017 due to it severe damage to the marine ecosystem. The Sri Lankan Ministry of Fisheries have estimated that damage of Rs 700 million has been done to the fishing gear of Sri Lanka fishermen by Indian bottom trawlers. With over 1000 Indian trawlers engaged in bottom trawling at a time, the Indian Coast Guard and the Sri Lankan Navy has been active in thwarting illegal maritime activities. Confrontations at sea has led to several deaths on both sides, which included an Indian fisherman and a Sri Lankan navy sailor. Indian fishermen and boats arrested in Sri Lankan waters are charged under the "Fisheries and Aquatic Resources Act No 2 of 1996" and released after the court hands them two years of rigorous imprisonment suspended for two years, retreat offenders are given prison terms.

== See also ==
- Katchatheevu
- Exclusive economic zone
- Exclusive economic zone of India
- Sri Lanka–India relations
- Bay of Bengal
- United Nations Convention on the Law of the Sea
