= Laxmi Nagar, Great Nicobar =

Laxmi Nagar
- village
- Location in Andaman and Nicobar Islands, India Laxmi Nagar (India)
- Coordinates: 6.87°N 93.9°E
- Country: India
- State: Andaman and Nicobar Islands
- District: Nicobar
- Tehsil: Great Nicobar

Population (2011)
  - Total: 230
- Time zone: UTC+5:30 (IST)
- 2011 census code: 645193

Laxmi Nagar is a village in the Nicobar district of Andaman and Nicobar Islands, India. It is located in the Great Nicobar tehsil. It is the location of India's southernmost land tip, Indira Point.

Laxmi Nagar and Joginder Nagar were originally Shompen camping sites. The Shompens deserted the place when forests were cleared to make way for a village of ex-servicemen.

== Demographics ==
According to the 2011 census of India, Laxmi Nagar has 13 households. The effective literacy rate (i.e. the literacy rate of population excluding children aged 6 and below) is 63.6%.

Demographics (2011 Census)
	Total	Male	Female
Population	230	226	4
Children aged below 6 years	2	2	0
Scheduled caste	0	0	0
Scheduled tribe	0	0	0
Literates	145	142	3
Workers (all)	222	218	4
Main workers (total)	219	215	4
Main workers: Cultivators	7	4	3
Main workers: Agricultural labourers	4	4	0
Main workers: Household industry workers	0	0	0
Main workers: Other	208	207	1
Marginal workers (total)	3	3	0
Marginal workers: Cultivators	0	0	0
Marginal workers: Agricultural labourers	1	1	0
Marginal workers: Household industry workers	0	0	0
Marginal workers: Others	2	2	0
Non-workers	8	8	0

== See also ==
- Kanyakumari
- List of extreme points of India
- Extreme points of Indonesia
