= Indira Point =

- Village
- Location in Andaman and Nicobar Islands, India Indira Point (India)
- Coordinates: 6.780621°N 93.8258513°E
- Country: India
- State: Andaman and Nicobar Islands
- District: Nicobar
- Tehsil: Great Nicobar
- Elevation: 47 m (154 ft)

Population (2011)
  - Total: 27
- Time zone: UTC+5:30 (IST)
- 2011 census code: 645188

Indira Point, the southernmost point of India's territory, is a village in the Nicobar district at Great Nicobar Island of Andaman and Nicobar Islands in India. It is located in the Great Nicobar tehsil.

Rondo Island, Indonesia's northernmost island in Sabang district of Aceh province of Sumatra, lies 163 km south of Little Andaman Island, and 145 km or 80 nautical miles from Indira Point. India and Indonesia are upgrading the deep sea port Sabang under the strategic military and economic collaboration to protect the channel between Great Nicobar Island and Rondo Island (c. May 2019), which is 612 km or 330 nautical miles from Indira Point.

== Etymology ==
This village was named Indira Point after former Prime Minister Indira Gandhi. The point was formerly known as Pygmalion Point and Parsons Point. It was renamed in honour of Indira Gandhi during mid-1980s. The announcement was made by the local Member of Parliament when Indira Gandhi visited the local light house on 19 February 1984. The official renaming ceremony happened on 10 October 1985.

== History ==
The Indira Point lighthouse was commissioned into service on 30 April 1972.

Located 500 kilometres north of the epicenter of the 2004 Indian Ocean earthquake, the southernmost tip subsided 4.25 metres (13.9 ft) after the earthquake, and many of the inhabitants went missing in the tsunami that followed. Sixteen to twenty families living next to the lighthouse and four scientists studying leatherback sea turtles were lost.

== Geography ==
Port Blair is connected to mainland India via air service. From Port Blair, Campbell Bay can be reached by Pawan Hans Helicopter service. Inter Island Boat from Port Blair is also available which usually travels via Little Andaman, Car Nicobar and Nancowry en route to Campbell Bay. MV Campbell Bay also operates once in a week from Port Blair (Phoenix Bay) to Campbell Bay.

Government is also constructing a 21 km road from Shashtri Nagar to Indira Point via a bridge on the Galathea river. The total length of the road from Zero Point to Indira Point will be 56 km and it will be completed within next few years (c. 2017). This area is protected by the Indian Coast Guard.

Galathea National Park and Lighthouse are the major attractions here.

== Administration ==
The village comes under the administration of Laxmi Nagar panchayat.

== Demographics ==
The village lost many of its residents in the 2004 tsunami. According to the 2011 census of India, Indira Point has only 4 households left. The effective literacy rate (i.e. the literacy rate of population excluding children aged 6 and below) is 85.19%.

== See also ==
Exclusive economic zones

- Exclusive economic zone of India
- Exclusive economic zone of Indonesia
- Exclusive economic zone of Malaysia
- Exclusive economic zone of Thailand
- India's Look-East Connectivity projects
- Sabang strategic port development, India-Indonesia project
- Sittwe Port, India-Myanmar project
- Dawei Port Project in Myanmar

Extreme points

- Indira Col, India administered extreme point on the disputed India-Pakistan-Tibet tri-junction
- Coco Islands, Myanmar's islands closest to Indian islands in northern Andaman sea
- Narcondam Island, India's easternmost point of Andaman Nicobar Islands group
- Landfall Island, India's northernmost island of Andaman Nicobar Islands group
- Rondo Island, Indonesia's northernmost island in Andaman sea
- Extreme points of India
- Extreme points of Indonesia
- Extreme points of Myanmar
- Extreme points of Bangladesh
- Extreme points of Thailand
- Borders of India

Other topics

- List of volcanoes in India
- List of endangered animals in India
- List of World Heritage Sites in India
