= Sabang, Aceh =

City in Aceh, Indonesia

Sabang
- City
- City of Sabang; Kota Sabang

Other transcription(s)
  - Jawoe: کوتا سابڠ
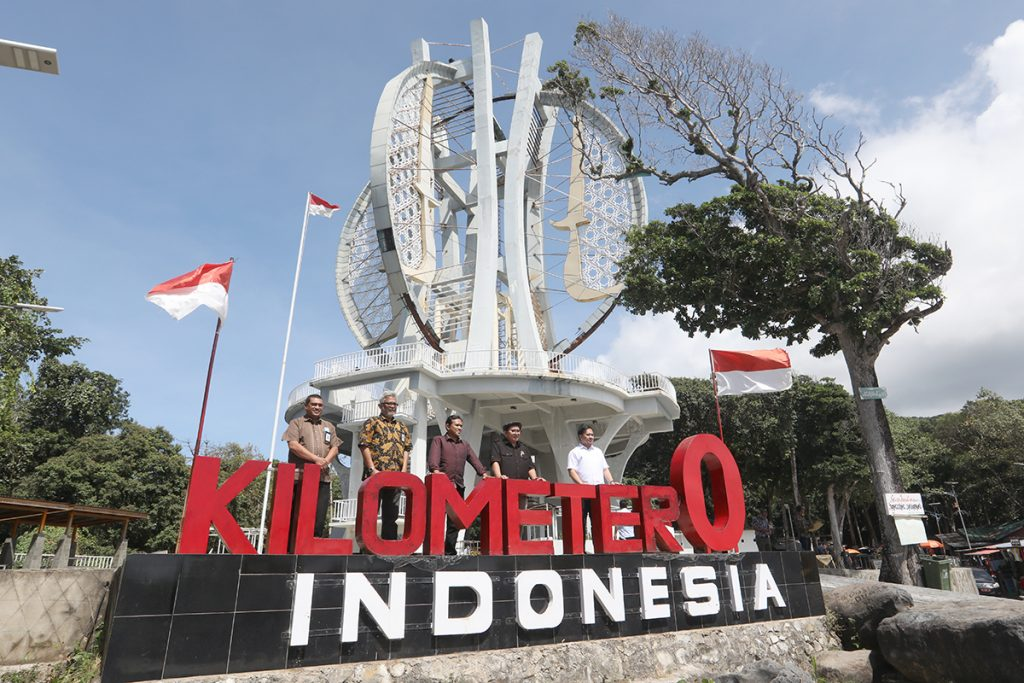
- 0 Km Monument of Indonesia

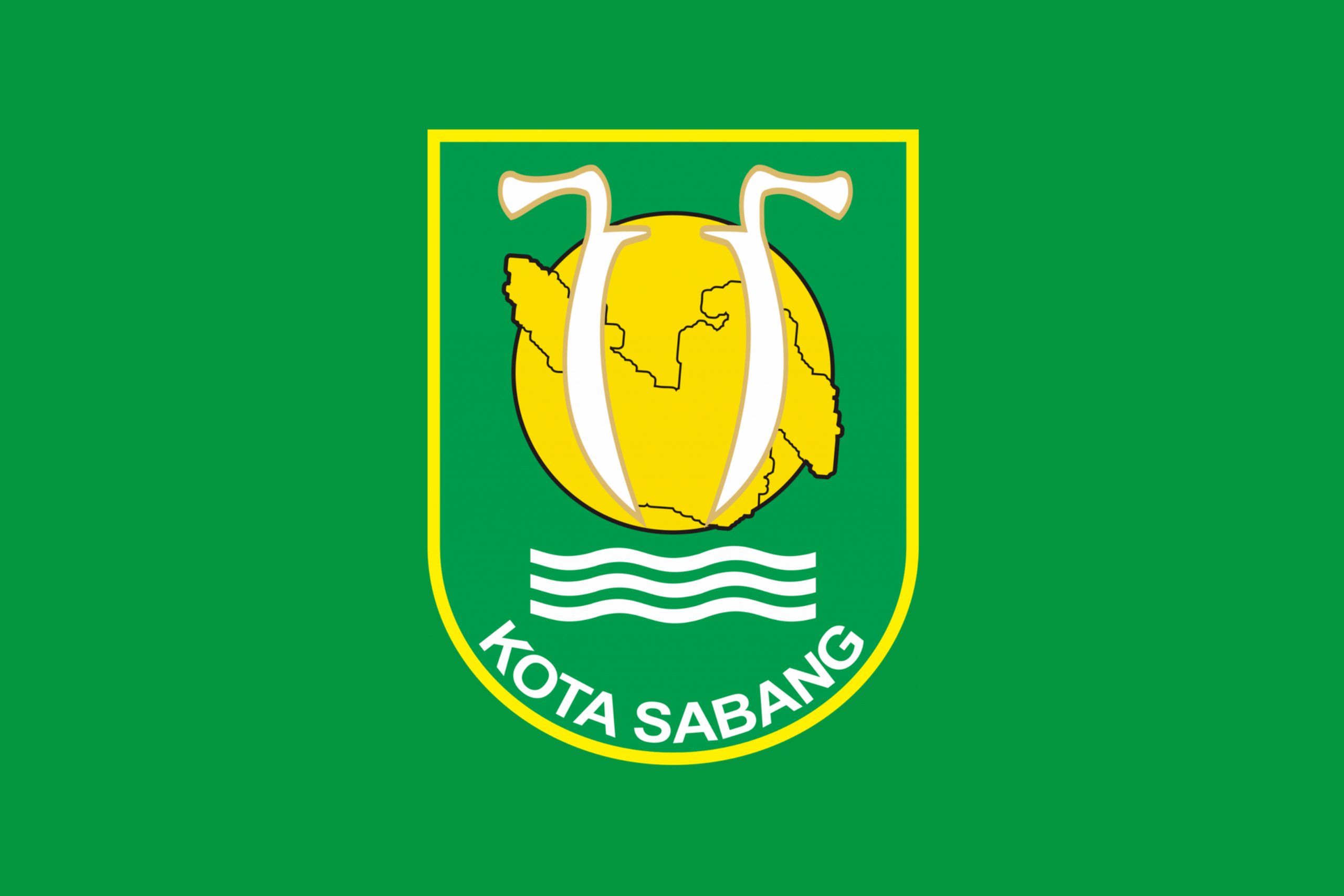
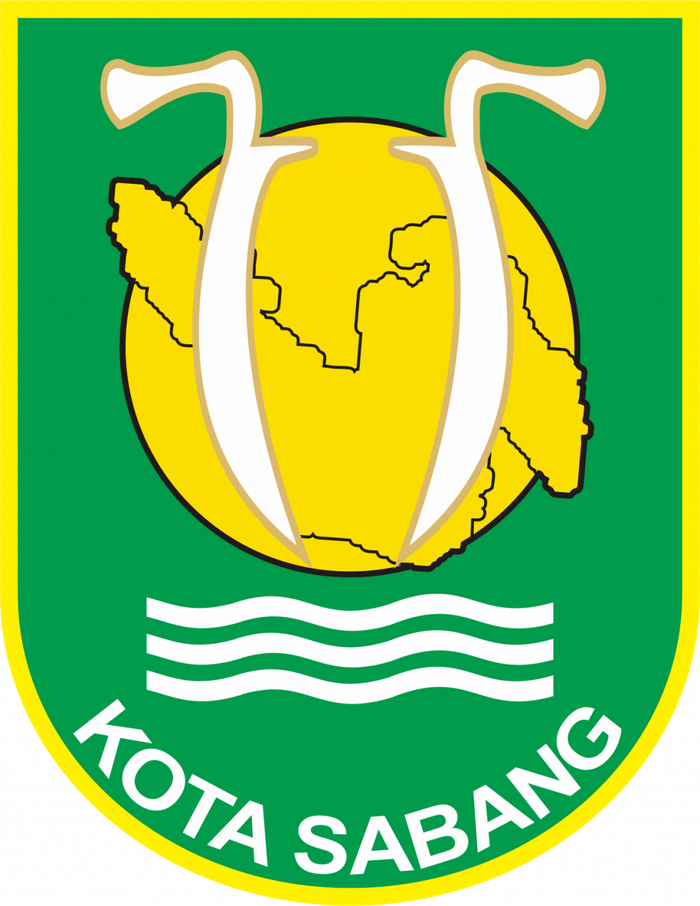
- Flag Coat of arms

- Location within Aceh

- Location in Sumatra, Indonesia and the Bay of Bengal Sabang (Indonesia) Sabang (Bay of Bengal)
- Coordinates: 5°53′39″N 95°19′9″E
- Country: Indonesia
- Province: Aceh
- Established: June 24, 1965; 61 years ago

Government
  - Mayor: Reza Fahlevi
  - Deputy Mayor: Suradji Junus

Area
  - Total: 122.14 km^{2} (47.16 sq mi)

Population (mid 2023 estimate)
  - Total: 43,527
  - Density: 356.37/km^{2} (922.99/sq mi)
- Time zone: UTC+7 (Indonesia Western Time)
- Area code: (+62) 652
- HDI (2021): ▲0.761 (High)
- Website: sabangkota.go.id

Sabang (Jawoe: سابڠ) is a city in Aceh province, Indonesia consisting entirely of Weh Island and several smaller islands off the northern tip of Sumatra. The administrative centre of the city is located 17 kilometres (11 mi) north of Banda Aceh. The city covers an area of 122.14 square kilometres (47.16 sq mi) and had a population of 43,391 in the 2020 census although that total was subsequently adjusted to 41,197; the official estimate as of mid 2023 was 43,527. Sabang is known as the northernmost and westernmost city of Indonesia. It also has by far the smallest population of any city in Indonesia.

== History ==
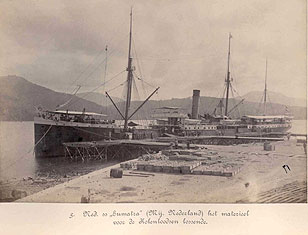
SS Sumatra docked at Sabang in c. 1895

According to local mythology, the island of Weh was once connected to the mainland Sumatra. The island of Weh has been described as far as Ptolemy in 301 BC and was mentioned as "Golden Island". During early 11th and 12th centuries, the island was often visited by Arab and Indian traders who called the island "Shabag", which arguably was the origin of the city name. The settlement on the island was called by Acehnese "Ulee Iheuh", which means "place for crossing". During the time of Aceh Sultanate, the island was used as a place for exiles by the sultanate.

Before the Suez Canal was opened in 1869, the Indonesian archipelago was reached via the Sunda Strait from Africa. From the Suez Canal, the route to Indonesia is shorter via the Malacca Strait. Due to its natural harbour with relatively deep and well sheltered water, the Dutch East Indies government decided to open Sabang as a quay. It changed hands to Dutch East Indies and later was operated as port and open for foreign ships in 1883 under management of "Asosiasi Atjeh" (Aceh Association). In 1883, Sabang quay was opened for ships to dock by the Atjeh Associate. At first, the harbour was intended as a coal station for the Dutch navy, but later also served merchant vessels and for the transfer of export goods from northern Sumatra. The port was expanded on 1887 and opened again as free port in 1895 under Sabang Maatschappij. In 1899, Asosiasi Ajteh was incorporated and became N.V. Zeehaven en Kolenstation Sabang te Batavia. The Japanese occupied the island in 1942 and installed numerous bunkers, fortifications, and gun emplacements. Their remnants can still be seen, though most have been re-purposed or removed. On 19 April 1944, the Japanese facilities were attacked by a combined Allied naval force in Operation Cockpit.

Sabang again became a free port under Indonesia in 1963 and gained city status in 1965. In 2000, Sabang was declared a free trade zone and as a result saw a rapid growth in shipping and trade. However, this boom stopped in 2004 due to Aceh having been declared as a military operation area, and also due to the 2004 Indian Ocean earthquake and tsunami. Unlike mainland Aceh where a mass exodus occurred, Sabang itself was much less affected by the military conflict and saw little tension between Acehnese and non-Acehnese.

== Geography ==
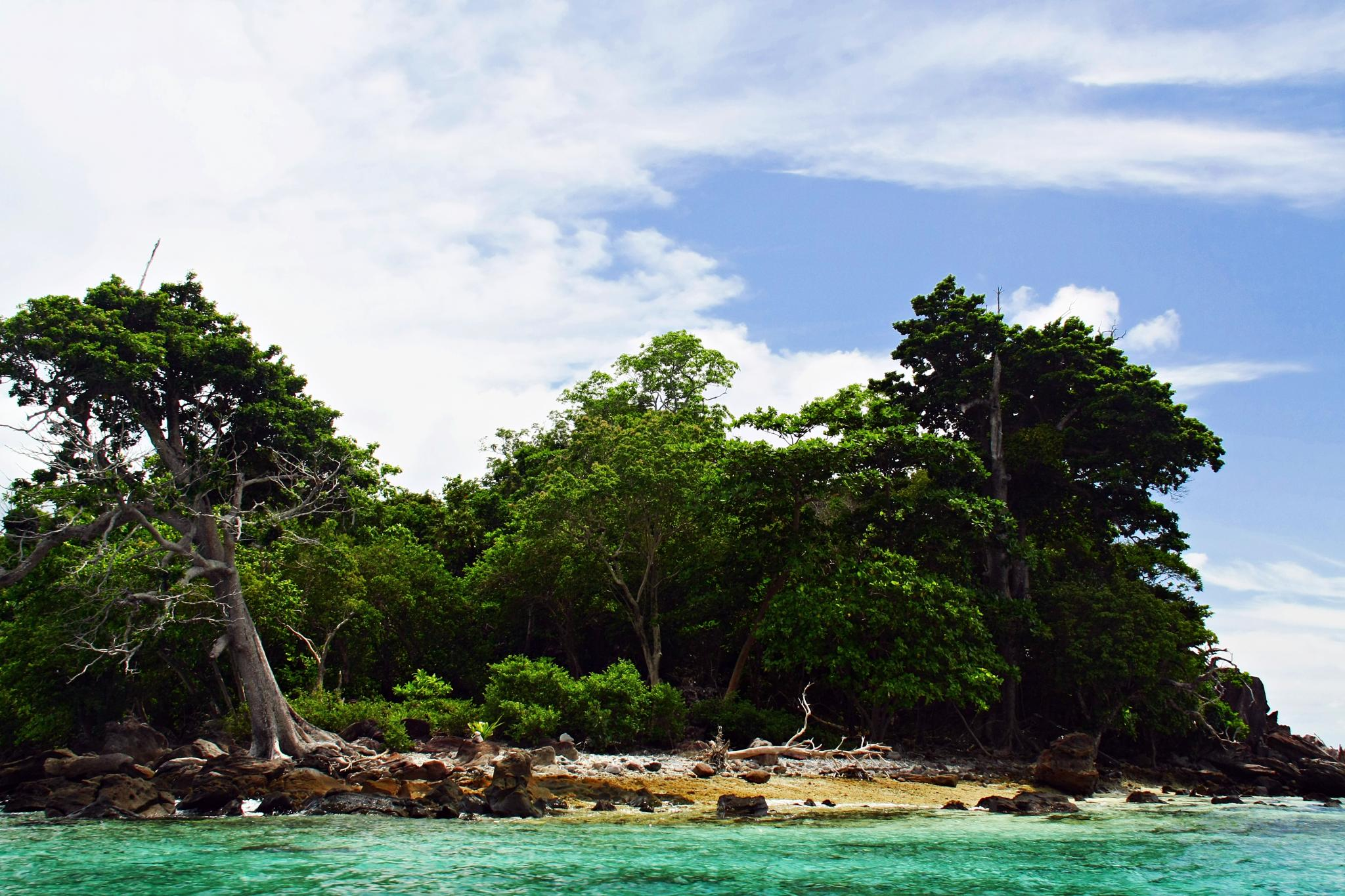
Rubiah Island, one of the islands in Sabang

Sabang is the Indonesia's northernmost administrative region, and directly borders with neighboring countries like Malaysia, Thailand, and India. It is surrounded by the Malacca Strait to its north and east and the Indian Ocean to its south and west.

Sabang city area covers five islands. The principal one is Weh Island (121 km^{2}), where the city center is located. Other islands are Rondo Island (or Tempurung - the northernmost island in Indonesia, with 0.65 km^{2} area), Rubiah Island (0.355 km^{2} area), Klah Island (0.186 km^{2} area) and Seulake Island (0.055 km^{2} area). There is a freshwater lake in Weh Island called Aneuk Laot Lake.

=== Climate ===
Sabang has a tropical rainforest climate (Af) with moderate rainfall from February to August and heavy rainfall from September to January.

Climate data for Sabang
Month	Jan	Feb	Mar	Apr	May	Jun	Jul	Aug	Sep	Oct	Nov	Dec	Year
Mean daily maximum °C (°F)	27.4 (81.3)	28.3 (82.9)	30.8 (87.4)	31.8 (89.2)	29.4 (84.9)	30.0 (86.0)	29.7 (85.5)	30.5 (86.9)	29.7 (85.5)	30.1 (86.2)	28.5 (83.3)	27.5 (81.5)	29.5 (85.1)
Daily mean °C (°F)	25.8 (78.4)	26.2 (79.2)	27.3 (81.1)	28.2 (82.8)	27.3 (81.1)	27.9 (82.2)	27.4 (81.3)	28.2 (82.8)	27.2 (81.0)	27.8 (82.0)	26.6 (79.9)	26.1 (79.0)	27.2 (80.9)
Mean daily minimum °C (°F)	24.2 (75.6)	24.2 (75.6)	23.8 (74.8)	24.7 (76.5)	25.3 (77.5)	25.9 (78.6)	25.2 (77.4)	26.0 (78.8)	24.8 (76.6)	25.6 (78.1)	24.8 (76.6)	24.7 (76.5)	24.9 (76.9)
Average rainfall mm (inches)	183 (7.2)	112 (4.4)	100 (3.9)	100 (3.9)	154 (6.1)	110 (4.3)	114 (4.5)	99 (3.9)	174 (6.9)	217 (8.5)	241 (9.5)	339 (13.3)	1,943 (76.4)
Source: Climate-Data.org

== Governance ==
=== Administrative districts ===
As at 2020, the city was divided into two districts (kecamatan), but in February 2021 a third district (Sukamakmue) was created from the more rural parts of the other two by taking in three villages (gampong) from each existing district. These are all listed below with their areas and their populations at the 2010 census and the 2020 census, together with the official estimates as of mid 2023. The table also includes the locations of the district administrative centres, the number of villages (gampong) in each district, and its postal codes.

Kode Wilayah	Name of District (kecamatan)	Area in km^{2}	Pop'n at 2010 census	Pop'n at 2020 census	Pop'n mid 2023 estimate	Admin centre	No. of villages (gampong)
11.72.02	Sukajaya	35.99	15,542	22,739	20,745	Balohan	7
11.72.03	Sukamakmue	69.08	^{(a)}	^{(a)}	8,983	Paya Seunara	6
11.72.01	Sukakarya	17.07	15,111	20,652	13,799	Aneuk Laot	5
	Total	122.14	30,653	41,197	43,527		18

Note: (a) the 2010 and 2020 Census populations of the new Sukamakmue District are included in the equivalent figures for the other two districts.

=== Villages (gampong) ===
Name of District (kecamatan)	Kode Wilayah	Name of Village (gampong)	Area in km^{2}	Pop'n mid 2023 estimate	Post Code
Sukajaya	11.72.02.2004	Jaboi	4.90	913	23526
Sukajaya	11.72.02.2005	Balohan	7.72	3,902	23525
Sukajaya	11.72.02.2006	Cot Abeuk	3.57	1,159	23523
Sukajaya	11.72.02.2007	Cot Ba'u	5.31	8,116	23522
Sukajaya	11.72.02.2008	Ie Meulee	3.07	4,983	23521
Sukajaya	11.72.02.2009	Ujoeng Kareung	1.23	784	23521
Sukajaya	11.72.02.2010	Anoi Itam	10.19	888	23524
Sukamakmue	11.72.03.2001	Iboih	27.31	1,536	23518
Sukamakmue	11.72.03.2002	Batee Shoek	11.30	1,828	23517
Sukamakmue	11.72.03.2003	Paya Seunara	5.64	3,404	23516
Sukamakmue	11.72.03.2004	Paya	14.45	752	23529
Sukamakmue	11.72.03.2005	Keunekai	5.69	1,052	23528
Sukamakmue	11.72.03.2006	Beurawang	4.69	411	23527
Sukakarya	11.72.01.2004	Krueng Raya	9.59	2,237	23515
Sukakarya	11.72.01.2005	Aneuk Laot	4.50	1,359	23514
Sukakarya	11.72.01.2006	Kuta Timu	1.57	2,358	23513
Sukakarya	11.72.01.2007	Kuta Barat	0.89	3,707	23512
Sukakarya	11.72.01.2008	Kuta Ateuh	0.52	4,138	23511

=== Local government ===
As with all Indonesian cities, the local government is a second-level administrative division run by a mayor and vice mayor, together with the city parliament, and it is equivalent to a regency. Executive power lies in the mayor and vice mayor, while legislation duties are carried out by the local parliament. Mayor, vice mayor, and parliament members are democratically elected by the people of the city. Meanwhile, head of districts are appointed directly by the city mayor on the recommendation of the city secretary.

== Economy ==
Economic activities in the city are diverse. As of 2021, the largest economic sector in the city was construction with contribution to city's gross regional product of 33.78%, followed by administration or social security services with 15.33%, and trade and retail sector with 14.67%. The city's gross regional product in 2021 was valued at 1.12 trillion rupiah with an annual economic growth of 5.82% on 2019 before the COVID-19 pandemic. The economy of the city shrank 1.29% in 2020 due to the pandemic before it bounced back again in 2021 with growth of 2.67. The fastest growing sectors in the city in 2021 include the healthcare sector with an annual growth of 9.25% and the transportation sector with an annual growth of 8.13%. In terms of size, the city has the smallest economy in Aceh when compared to other cities and regencies in the province.

== Transport ==
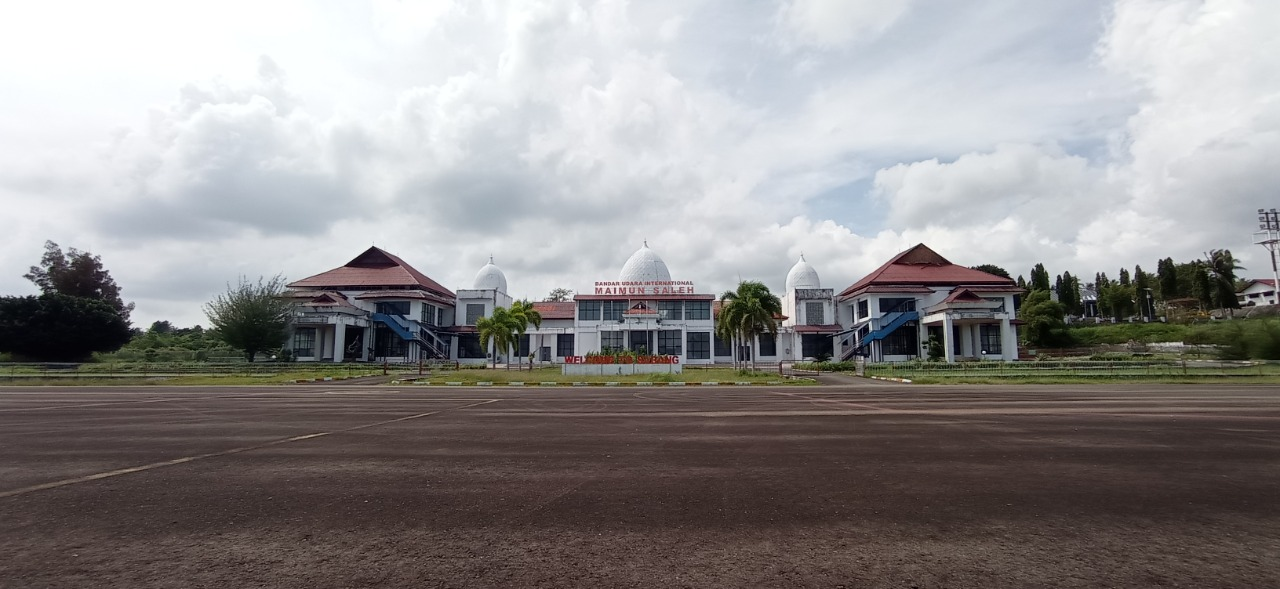
Maimun Saleh Airport which serves the city

=== Airport ===
Sabang is served by Maimun Saleh Airport. The airport is located southeast of the central city on Weh Island and is capable of handling ATR 72 aircraft. The airport is a military base for the Indonesian Air Force with no scheduled commercial flights.

=== Port ===
Sabang has a deep sea port which is important to the trade in the region. India and Indonesia are jointly developing the Sabang deep sea port which also lies close to India's southernmost territory of Andaman and Nicobar Islands. In 2002, Indian Navy and Indonesian Navy signed an Ind-Indo Corpat agreement. Indian naval ships have been regularly visiting Sabang port following the signing of this agreement. Indonesia's minister for maritime affairs, Luhut Pandjaitan, stated that Indonesia has given economic and military access by India to the strategic Sabang port; India will invest in the port and economic zone of Sabang city. Pelni, state-owned shipping company, is serving the city through Sea Toll Program which is highly subsidized to nearby cities such as Lhokseumawe, Banda Aceh, and Medan.

=== Highways and roads ===
The city has a total of 144.75 kilometers of road, all of which have been paved with asphalt as of 2022. The city, unlike most of places in Indonesia, does not have any angkot (shared taxis), and the presence of public transportation inside the city is minimal. Ride-hailing service Gojek is present in the city.

== Education ==
The city in 2022 has a total of 20 kindergartens, 30 elementary schools, 11 junior high schools, and 4 senior high schools, in addition of one vocational high school. There are also two higher education institutions in the city, Al-Aziziyah Sabang Sharia College and Ibnu Sina Nursery Academy. Both of these institutions are private. The literacy rate in the city is relatively high at 99.76% in 2020.
