= Narcondam Island =

Island in India

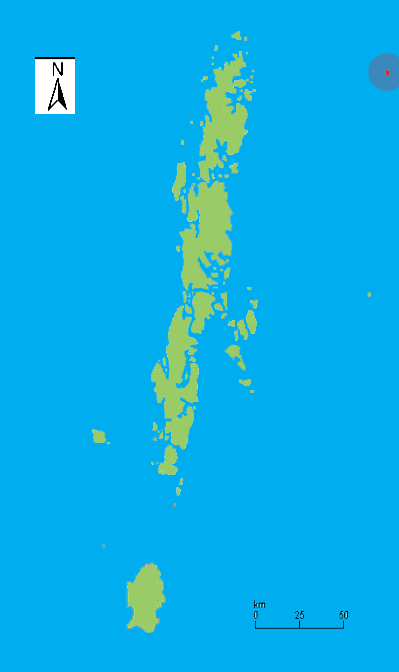
- Outline map of the Andaman Islands, with the location of Narcondam Island highlighted (red circle).

- Location within Andaman and Nicobar Islands Location within Bay of Bengal

Geography
- Location: Bay of Bengal
- Coordinates: 13.45°N 94.27°E
- Archipelago: Andaman Islands
- Adjacent to: Indian Ocean
- Total islands: 1
- Major islands: Narcondam
- Area: 7.6 km^{2} (2.9 sq mi)
- Length: 4 km (2.5 mi)
- Width: 3.0 km (1.86 mi)
- Coastline: 12.22 km (7.593 mi)
- Highest elevation: 710 m (2330 ft)

Administration
- India
- District: North and Middle Andaman
- Island group: Andaman Islands
- Island sub-group: East Volcano Islands
- Tehsil: Diglipur Tehsil
- Largest settlement: Narcondam Police Station (pop. 16)

Demographics
- Population: 16 (2016)
- Pop. density: 2.1/km^{2} (5.4/sq mi)
- Ethnic groups: Hindu, Andamanese

Additional information
- Time zone: IST (UTC+5:30)
- PIN: 744202
- Telephone code: 031927
- ISO code: IN-AN-00
- Official website: www.and.nic.in
- Literacy: 84.4%
- Avg. summer temperature: 30.2 °C (86.4 °F)
- Avg. winter temperature: 23.0 °C (73.4 °F)
- Sex ratio: 1.2♂/♀
- Census Code: 35.639.0004
- Official Languages: Hindi, English

Narcondam mountain

Highest point
- Elevation: 710 m (2,330 ft)

Geography
- Location: Andaman Islands, India

Geology
- Mountain type: Stratovolcano
- Last eruption: Unknown

Narcondam, India's easternmost island, is a small volcanic island located in the northern Andaman Sea. The island's peak rises to 710 m above mean sea level, and it is formed of andesite. It is part of the Andaman Islands, the main body of which lie approximately 74 km (46 mi) to the west. The island is part of the Indian union territory of Andaman and Nicobar Islands. The island is small, covering an area of approximately 7.6 square kilometres. It was classified as an active volcano by the Geological Survey of India.

== Etymology ==
The name Narcondam could have been derived from the Tamil word naraka-kundram (நரககுன்றம்), meaning "a pit of Hell," although this may be the result of confusion between it and Barren Island.

== History ==
Until 1986 Burma claimed sovereignty over the island. This claim was given up on reaching agreement with India on the delimitation of the maritime boundary between the two nations in the Andaman Sea, the Coco channel and the Bay of Bengal. A lighthouse was established on the slopes of Narcondam in 1983.

== Geography and geology ==
The island lies 256 km (159 mi) northeast from Port Blair. Further to the south west (approximately 150 km (93 mi)) lies the active volcano island of Barren Island. Narcondam Island is about 260 km (160 mi) miles from Burma, and is almost 1,300 km (810 mi) miles from Vishakhapatnam (part of the mainland of India). It belongs to the East Volcano Islands. The island is small, having an area of 7.63 km^{2} (2.95 sq mi).

The island is largely forested. The island is formed from a volcano, which had not known to have been active in recent times, until on 8 June 2005 there were reports of "mud and smoke" being ejected from the volcano. The 2004 Indian Ocean earthquake is thought to have caused magma to move underground and may be related to the current activity. If the reports were accurate this would alter the scientific status of Narcondam to active. Narcondam Island holds the easternmost point of the Andaman and Nicobar Islands.

=== Narcondam Mountain ===
Narcondam Island's volcanic mountain, at 710 meters is the second tallest point in the Andaman and Nicobar Islands, the first being Saddle Peak, North Andaman Island at 752 meters.

== Administration ==
Narcondam Island belongs to the North and Middle Andaman administrative district, and is part of Diglipur Taluk. The village is near the Police station.

== Transportation ==
Narcondam Island is accessible through ships that run from Diglipur. A helicopter facility is also available.

== Demographics ==
There is only one village. According to the 2011 census of India, the Island has one household. The effective literacy rate (i.e. the literacy rate of population excluding children aged six and below) is 100%.

Demographics (2011 census)
	Total	Male	Female
Population	16	16	0
Children aged below 6 years	0	0	0
Scheduled caste	0	0	0
Scheduled tribe	16	16	0
Literates	16	16	0
Workers (all)	16	16	0
Main workers (total)	16	16	0

The 16 residents (all supervisory police personnel) are all living in a single household on the northeast corner. They harvest coconuts and bananas on a small plantation near the post.

== Tourism ==
=== Scuba diving at Narcondam ===
The waters surrounding Narcondam Island are a diving destination. Narcondam's prime dive sites include rocky ridges and steep slopes like Chimneys, Ooh La La and Lighthouse Reef, where massive barrel sponges, huge gorgonian fans and lush soft corals thrive. Fish life can include Napoleon wrasse, bumphead parrotfish and mantas, as well as occasional whitetip and gray reef sharks. Another special place is HQ Pinnacle, where a submerged rock formation acts as a magnet for dogtooth tuna and hundreds of bigeye trevally. For a more tranquil setting, several bays around the island offer gently sloping terrain populated with fields of hard corals and colorful reef fish.

The island is very remote and diving is accessible only via a live-aboard.

== Fauna ==
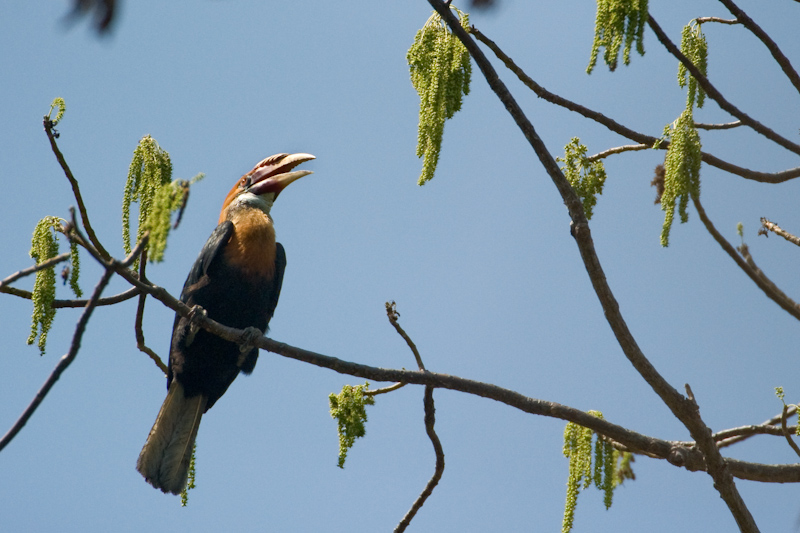
A Narcondam hornbill

About 25-32 bird species, both resident and migratory, have been recorded from the island. Of these, the most famous is the Narcondam hornbill (Rhyticeros narcondami), a threatened hornbill that is endemic to the island. The closest living relative of the bird is the Blyth's hornbill (Rhyticeros plicatus). It has the smallest range of any Asian hornbill and only has a population of between 300 and 650 individuals, but still has a stable population.

As Narcondam is a small volcanic island, not connected to any significant land mass, terrestrial mammalian fauna is of low diversity. However, the island flying fox (Pteropus hypomelanus) and Sikkim rat (Rattus andamanensis) are the most common native mammals on this island. An unidentified small bat was also seen on a survey. Introduced goats (Capra aegagrus hircus) and cats (Felis catus) were formerly present on the island, threatening native fauna, but almost all of them have since been removed. In 2020, a new species of Crocidura shrew was discovered on the island, which was described in 2021 as the Narcondam shrew (Crocidura narcondamica). It and the Narcondam hornbill are presently the only two known endemic fauna of the island.

There are several species of reptile on the island. The most common reptile on the island is the spotted forest skink (Sphenomorphus maculatus), which closely resembles populations of the species from northeast India. Tytler's skink (Eutropis tytleri), a large skink endemic to the Andamans, is also common on the island, with the Narcondam variants being slightly smaller than those on the main Andamans. The Andaman Islands day gecko (Phelsuma andamanensis), Andaman bent-toed gecko (Cyrtodactylus rubidus), Andaman giant gecko (Gekko verrauxi), and Anderson's day gecko (Cnemaspis andersonii), which are all gecko species endemic to the Andaman-Coco island chain, have also been found on Narcondam. The Andaman water monitor (Varanus salvator andamanensis) is the only large predator on the island and preys on the Narcondam hornbill, especially its young. The paradise flying snake (Chrysopelea ornata) has been reported from the island in past surveys. The blue-lipped sea krait (Laticauda laticaudata) is seen in the waters around Narcondam Island.

=== Narcondam Island Wildlife Sanctuary ===
Narcondam Island Wildlife Sanctuary is notified as a protected reserve by the government of India. It is also listed on the UNESCO's tentative Lists of World Heritage Sites. The island was notified as a sanctuary to protect and monitor the Narcondam hornbill.

== Flora ==
Narcondam Island is almost entirely covered with evergreen and moist deciduous forest. Grassy slopes dominate the southern and southeast aspects of the hill (BirdLife International 2001). The island is covered with tropical evergreen forest, semi-evergreen forest, moist deciduous forest, littoral forest and mangrove forest (Pande et al. 1991). The island bears old, dead and decaying trees, interlaced with thorny creepers and luxuriantly flowering tall trees (Yahya and Zarri 2002a). The flora on the higher reaches of the hill is mostly evergreen and consists of Dipterocarpus, Sideroxylon and Ficus trees. However, some deciduous species such as Bombax insigne are also present. The vegetation towards the summit is mostly Moist Evergreen with several epiphytes. The lower hills following the shoreline have both deciduous and evergreen trees such as Terminalia catappa, T. bialata and Caryota mitis. The shoreline has some introduced species such as coconut and banana.

== Facilities ==
=== Radar station ===
The Indian Coast Guard proposed the construction of a coastal surveillance radar installation on Narcondam Island and had requested for the release of 0.64 ha of forest area for the purpose. This was turned down by the MOEF of UPA govt as it would endanger the population of endemic hornbills while other alternative sites existed for the siting of the radar. As of 10 June 2014, MOEF has given clearance for the Radar station. Union minister for environment and forests, Prakash Javadekar gave the approval. However, the plan was subsequently modified and as of 2020, no radar installation has been built on the island.

== Image gallery ==
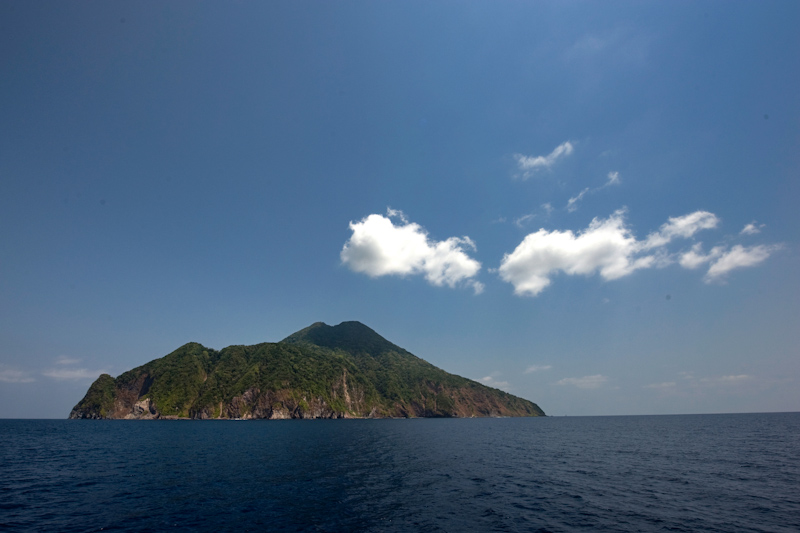
Narcondam island south view

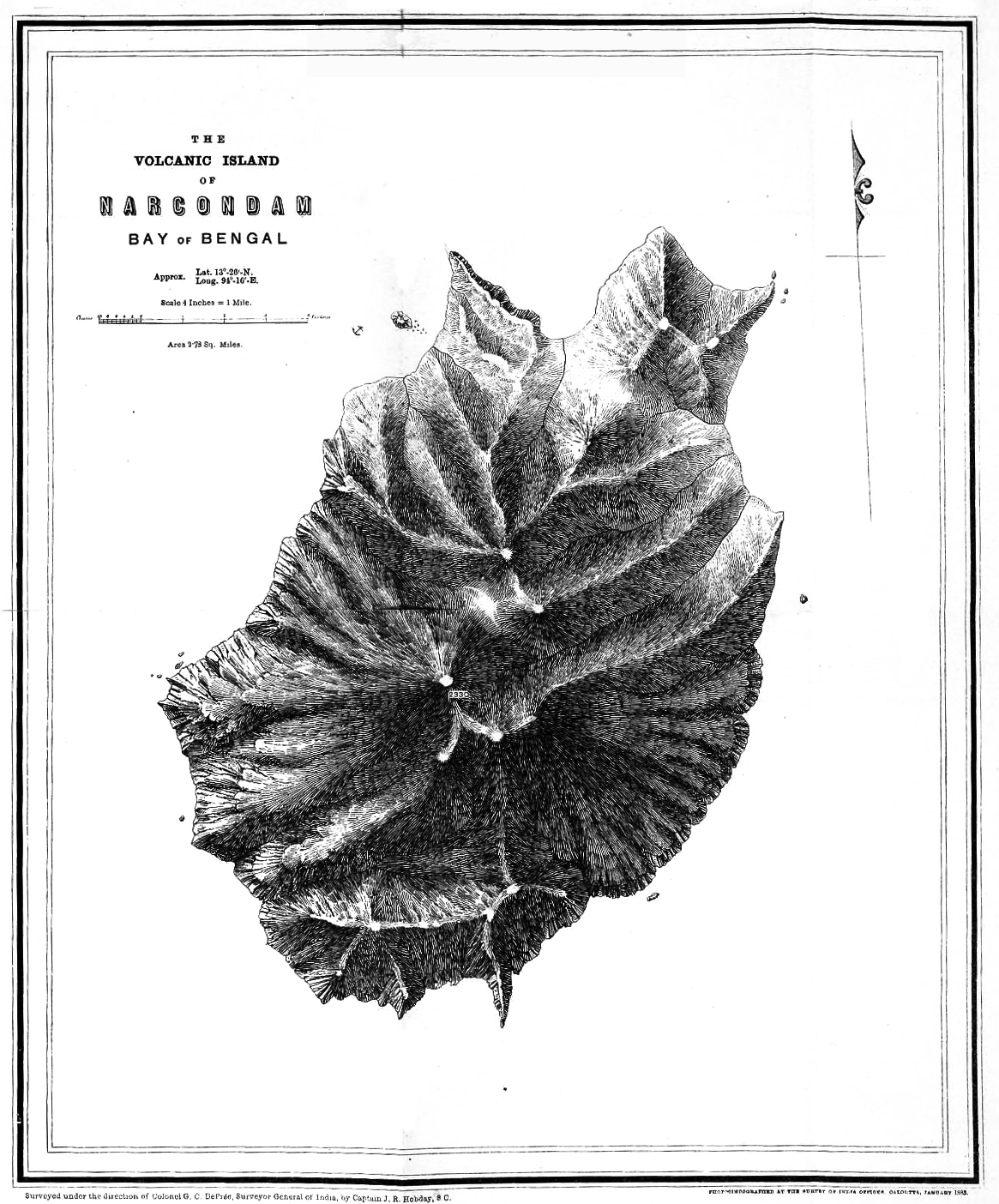
Topography of the island

== See also ==
Exclusive economic zones

- Exclusive economic zone of India
- Exclusive economic zone of Indonesia
- Exclusive economic zone of Malaysia
- Exclusive economic zone of Thailand
- India's Look-East Connectivity projects
- Sabang strategic port development, India-Indonesia project
- Sittwe Port, India-Myanmar project
- Dawei Port Project in Myanmar

Extreme points

- Indira Point, India's southernmost point of Andaman Nicobar Islands group
- Rondo Island, Indonesia's northernmost island is closest to Indira Point
- Landfall Island, India's northernmost island of Andaman Nicobar Islands group
- Coco Islands, Myanmar's islands in Andaman sea just north of India's Prearis Island
- Extreme points of India
- Extreme points of Indonesia
- Extreme points of Myanmar
- Extreme points of Bangladesh
- Extreme points of Thailand
- Borders of India

Other topics

- List of volcanoes in India
- List of endangered animals in India
- List of World Heritage Sites in India
