= North Passage Island =

Island of the Andaman Islands

- Location within Andaman and Nicobar Islands Location within Bay of Bengal

Geography
- Location: Bay of Bengal
- Coordinates: 12.28°N 92.93°E
- Archipelago: Andaman Islands
- Adjacent to: Indian Ocean
- Area: 12.81 km^{2} (4.95 sq mi)
- Length: 8.7 km (5.41 mi)
- Width: 4.4 km (2.73 mi)
- Coastline: 30.23 km (18.784 mi)

Administration
- India
- District: North and Middle Andaman
- Island group: Andaman Islands
- Island sub-group: East Baratang Group
- Taluk: Rangat Taluk
- Largest settlement: Merk Bay

Demographics
- Population: 3 (2016)
- Pop. density: 0.23/km^{2} (0.6/sq mi)
- Ethnic groups: Hindu, Andamanese

Additional information
- Time zone: IST (UTC+5:30)
- PIN: 744203
- Telephone code: 031927
- ISO code: IN-AN-00
- Official website: www.and.nic.in
- Literacy: 84.4%
- Avg. summer temperature: 30.2 °C (86.4 °F)
- Avg. winter temperature: 23.0 °C (73.4 °F)
- Sex ratio: 1.2♂/♀
- Census Code: 35.639.0004
- Official Languages: Hindi, English

North Passage Island is an island of the Andaman Islands. It belongs to the North and Middle Andaman administrative district, part of the Indian union territory of Andaman and Nicobar Islands. The island lies 80 km (50 mi) north from Port Blair.

== Geography ==
The island belongs to the East Baratang Group and lies east of Baratang and Colebrooke Island. It is 3 nmi (3.0 nmi; 5.6 km) south of Long Island. 95% of the island is a wildlife reserve. The Cape Portman lighthouse, with a focal plane 29 m (95 ft); white flash every 5 s. This lighthouse marks the northern entrance to Diligent Strait. Located on a sharp cape at the northern tip of North Passage Island.

== Administration ==
Politically, North Passage Island, along neighboring East Baratang Group, is part of Rangat Taluk.

== Demographics ==
There is only 1 village, located at Merk Bay. North Passage Island in Andaman and Nicobar has very diminutive history of habitation, other than erratic visits from different sects of the Great Andamanese. Just about 100 acres of land behind Merk Bay beach was handed over to the Agriculture Department of Andaman Islands four decades ago. This was done in order to set up a coconut plantation. The only inhabitants of this island at present are representatives of the Forest Department and caretakers of the Coconut Plantation.

== See also ==
- Tourism in the Andaman and Nicobar Islands
- Tourism in India
