= Khudirampur =

- Village
- Location in the Andaman and Nicobar Islands Khudirampur (India)
- Coordinates: 13.2361°N 92.966°E
- Country: India
- Union Territory: Andaman and Nicobar Islands
- District: North and Middle Andaman
- Subdistrict: Diglipur

Population (2011)
  - Total: 1,328
- Time zone: UTC+05:30 (IST)

Khudirampur is a village in Diglipur, North Andaman Islands.

== History ==
The village is named after Khudiram Bose. A statue of Khudiram Bose stands in the village.

== Geography ==
Landmarks include Saddle Peak, the highest peak in Andaman and Nicobar Islands (732 meters) and the Kalpong River.

The largest river that flows through Khudirampur is Kalpong River.

== Demography ==
The Khudirampur village has population of 64 of which 33 are males while 31 are females in 18 households.

Children with age 0-6 number 9, 14.06% of the total. The Average Sex Ratio of Khudirampur village is 939, which is higher than Andaman and Nicobar Islands state average of 876. Child Sex Ratio for the Khudirampur as per census is 1250, higher than Andaman and Nicobar Islands average of 968.

Khudirampur village has a lower literacy rate than Andaman and Nicobar Islands. In 2011, the literacy rate of 69.09% compared to 86.63% of Andaman and Nicobar Islands. In Khudirampur Male literacy stands at 86.21% while female literacy rate was 50.00%.

== Governance ==
Khudirampur village is administrated by an elected Sarpanch (Head of Village).
