= Smith Island (Andaman Islands) =

Island of the Andaman Islands

- Location within Andaman and Nicobar Islands

Geography
- Location: Bay of Bengal
- Coordinates: 13.34°N 93.05°E
- Archipelago: Andaman Islands
- Adjacent to: Indian Ocean
- Area: 20.45 km^{2} (7.90 sq mi)
- Length: 8.6 km (5.34 mi)
- Width: 4.8 km (2.98 mi)
- Coastline: 29.00 km (18.02 mi)
- Highest elevation: 131 m (430 ft)

Administration
- India
- District: North and Middle Andaman
- Island group: Andaman Islands
- Island sub-group: Aerial Bay Islands
- Taluk: Diglipur Taluk
- Largest settlement: Smith (pop. 260)

Demographics
- Population: 600 (2011)
- Pop. density: 29.3/km^{2} (75.9/sq mi)
- Ethnic groups: Hindu, Andamanese

Additional information
- Time zone: IST (UTC+5:30)
- PIN: 744202
- Telephone code: 031927
- ISO code: IN-AN-00
- Official website: www.and.nic.in
- Literacy: 71.8%
- Avg. summer temperature: 30.2 °C (86.4 °F)
- Avg. winter temperature: 23.0 °C (73.4 °F)
- Sex ratio: 1.2♂/♀
- Census Code: 35.639.0004
- Official Languages: Hindi, English

Smith Island is an island of the Andaman Islands. It belongs to the North and Middle Andaman administrative district, part of the Indian union territory of Andaman and Nicobar Islands. The island lies 298 km (185 mi) north of Port Blair.

== Geography ==
The island is located in Aerial Bay, near Diglipur. During the low tide, it gets connected to the nearby Ross Island by a thin sandbar.

== Administration ==
Politically, Smith Island, along with the neighboring Aerial Bay Islands, is part of Diglipur Taluk.

== Transportation ==
Ferry service is available from Aerial bay jetty or Kalipur water sports center. Normally ship is available once a week.

== Demographics ==
There are 3 villages on the island. According to the 2011 census of India, the Island has 160 households. The main village has 60 households, with Eco rest houses which are available for overnight stay. The effective literacy rate (i.e. the literacy rate of population excluding children aged 6 and below) is 100%.

Demographics (2011 Census)
	Total	Male	Female
Population	600	328	272
Children aged below 6 years	64	35	29
Scheduled caste	0	0	0
Scheduled tribe	1	1	0
Literates	431	260	171
Workers (all)	202	191	11
Main workers (total)	95	89	6

== Fauna ==
Smith island is home to the Olive Ridley turtles. If at the right place at the right time, tourists can even witness the turtle nesting.
