= East Baratang Group =

East Baratang Islands
- Location within Andaman and Nicobar Islands

Geography
- Location: Bay of Bengal
- Coordinates: 12.31°N 92.90°E
- Archipelago: Andaman Islands
- Adjacent to: Indian Ocean
- Total islands: 20
- Major islands: Long; Strait; North Passage; Colebrooke
- Area: 53.87 km^{2} (20.80 sq mi)

Administration
- India
- District: North and Middle Andaman
- Island group: Andaman Islands
- Island sub-group: Great Andaman
- Taluk: Rangat Taluk

Demographics
- Population: 1074 (2011)
- Pop. density: 20.00/km^{2} (51.8/sq mi)
- Ethnic groups: Hindu, Andamanese

Additional information
- Time zone: IST (UTC+5:30)
- PIN: 744203
- Telephone code: 031927
- ISO code: IN-AN-00
- Official website: www.and.nic.in
- Literacy: 84.4%
- Avg. summer temperature: 30.2 °C (86.4 °F)
- Avg. winter temperature: 23.0 °C (73.4 °F)
- Sex ratio: 1.2♂/♀
- Census Code: 35.639.0004
- Official Languages: Hindi, English

East Baratang Group are an island group of the Andaman Islands, located east of Baratang Island.

== Geography ==
The major islands in the group are Porlob Island, Long Island, Guitar Island, Colebrooke Island, North Passage Island, Strait Island.

== Administration ==
Politically, the East Baratang Islands are part of Rangat Taluk.
