= Saddle Mountain =

Saddle Mountain may refer to:

== Canada ==
- Saddle Mountain (Alberta), in Banff National Park

== United States ==
=== Arizona ===
- Saddle Mountain (Arizona), the Saddle Mountain Wilderness
- Saddle Mountain (Grand Canyon), a prominent mountain ridge and protected wilderness area of the same name in the Kaibab National Forest

=== Colorado ===
- Saddle Mountain Natural Area, a protected area in Park County, Colorado
- Saddle Mountain (Delta County, Colorado), near Crawford, Colorado

=== Idaho ===
- Saddle Mountain (Idaho)

=== Montana ===
- Saddle Mountain (Beaverhead County, Montana) in Beaverhead County, Montana
- Saddle Mountain (Deer Lodge County, Montana) in Deer Lodge County, Montana
- Saddle Mountain (Lincoln County, Montana) in Lincoln County, Montana
- Saddle Mountain (Powell County, Montana) in Powell County, Montana
- Saddle Mountain (Ravalli County, Montana) in Ravalli County, Montana

=== Oklahoma ===
- Saddle Mountain, Oklahoma

=== Oregon ===
- Saddle Mountain State Natural Area, in the Coast Range of Oregon
- Saddle Mountain (Clatsop County, Oregon), in northwest Oregon
- Saddle Mountain (Klamath County, Oregon) in Klamath County, Oregon
- South Saddle Mountain, in Washington County, Oregon

=== Washington ===
- Saddle Mountain National Wildlife Refuge, in the Hanford Reach National Monument
- Saddle Mountains, a ridge

=== West Virginia ===
- Saddle Mountain (Mineral County, West Virginia)

=== Wyoming ===
- Saddle Mountain (Wyoming), Yellowstone National Park

== See also ==
- Saddle Mountain, a translation of Mount Sedlovaya, a former name of Mount Seorak in South Korea
- Saddle Peak (disambiguation)
- Saddle Hill, a translation of Cerro de la Silla, Mexico
