= Saddle Peak =

Saddle Peak is the name of several mountains:

- Saddle Peak (Andaman Islands), the highest peak in India's Andaman and Nicobar chain
  - Saddle Peak National Park, Andaman Islands
- Saddle Peak (Alaska)
- Saddle Peak (Antarctica), in Victoria Land
- Saddle Peak (California), in the Santa Monica Mountains
- Saddle Peak, (Irish Hills, California) in San Luis Obispo County
- Saddle Peak (Montana) in Gallatin County, Montana
- Saddle Peak (Guadalupe), Nueva Leon MX, GPS:25 ° 37'40 "N 100 ° 14'21" O / 25,627777777778, -100,23905388889
- Saddle Peak (Oregon)
- Saddle Peak (Washington)
- Saddle Peak (Improvement District 9, Alberta Canada)
- Saddle Peak Hills, California

== See also ==
- Saddle Mountain (disambiguation)
