= Port Cornwallis =

Port on Ross Island, Andaman Islands

Coordinates: 13°17′N 93°05′E

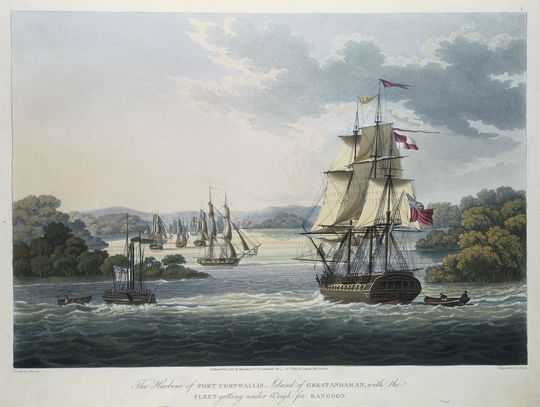
The Harbour of Port Cornwallis, Island of Great Andaman with the Fleet getting under way for Rangoon, circa 1825

Port Cornwallis is a port situated on Ross Island, off the NE coast of North Andaman. This should not be confused with Ross Island, which is opposite Port Blair, South Andaman.

There is a lighthouse, commissioned in 1973, near Port Cornwallis, "on the summit of Bopung Hill at the entrance of Aerial Bay."
