= East Volcano Islands =

- Location within Andaman and Nicobar Islands

Geography
- Location: Bay of Bengal
- Coordinates: 13.45°N 94.27°E
- Archipelago: Andaman Islands
- Adjacent to: Indian Ocean
- Total islands: 2
- Major islands: Narcondam Island; Barren Island
- Area: 15.97 km^{2} (6.17 sq mi)
- Highest elevation: 710 m (2330 ft)

Administration
- India
- District: North and Middle Andaman
- Island group: Andaman Islands
- Island sub-group: East Volcano Islands
- Tehsil: multiple
- Largest settlement: Narcondam Police Station (pop. 16)

Demographics
- Population: 16 (2016)
- Pop. density: 1/km^{2} (3/sq mi)
- Ethnic groups: Hindu, Andamanese

Additional information
- Time zone: IST (UTC+5:30)
- PIN: 744202
- Telephone code: 031927
- ISO code: IN-AN-00
- Official website: www.and.nic.in
- Literacy: 84.4%
- Avg. summer temperature: 30.2 °C (86.4 °F)
- Avg. winter temperature: 23.0 °C (73.4 °F)
- Sex ratio: 1.2♂/♀
- Census Code: 35.639.0004
- Official Languages: Hindi, English

East Volcano Islands is a small group of islands to the east of Great Andaman, all volcanic islands, located in the Andaman Sea. The two islands in this group are: Narcondam Island, Barren Island

== Administration ==
East Volcano Islands belongs to the North and Middle Andaman administrative district.

Narcondam Island belongs to Diglipur tehsil and Barren Island belongs to Rangat tehsil.

== Transportation ==
Ferry service is available from Diglipur to Narcondam. Normally ship is available once a week, only authorized by police.

== Demographics ==
There is only 1 village, at Narcondam.
