= List of dams and reservoirs in the Andaman and Nicobar Islands =

The following are the dams and reservoirs located in Andaman and Nicobar Islands:

River	Dam	Height	Length	Type	Storage capacity	Reservoir area	Complete
Dhanikhari	Dhanikhari	30 m (98 ft)	132 m (433 ft)	Gravity	5,193,760 m^{3} (4,211 acre⋅ft)	611,524 m^{2} (151 acres)	1973
Kalpong	Kalpong	31.5 m (103 ft)	139 m (456 ft)	Rock-fill & Gravity	15,270,000 m^{3} (12,380 acre⋅ft)	1,840,000 m^{2} (455 acres)	2001
