= Kaplong Hydroelectric Project =

Kalpong Dam
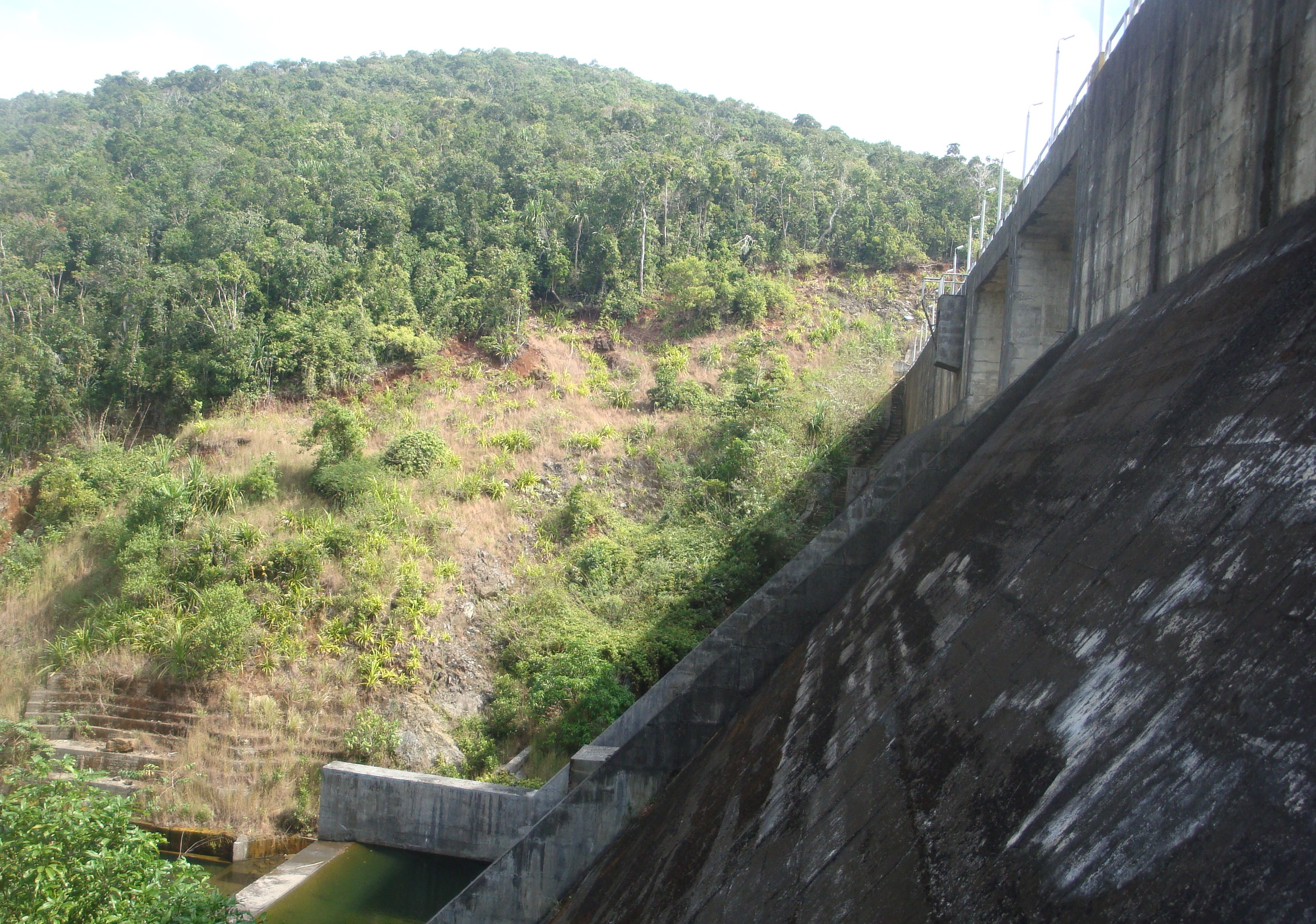

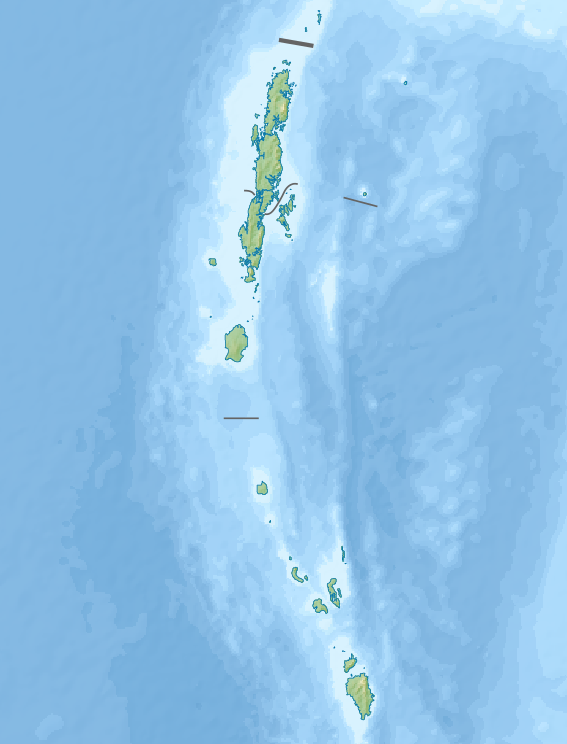
- Location within Andaman and Nicobar Islands
- Official name: Kalpong Hydro Electric Project
- Country: India
- Location: Andaman and Nicobar Islands
- Coordinates: 13°09′16″N 92°58′02″E
- Status: Operational
- Opening date: 2001
- Owner: NHPC

Dam and spillways
- Type of dam: Left Fork- Concrete Gravity dam, Right Fork - Rock-Fill
- Impounds: Kalpong River
- Height: Concrete Dam 34 m (112 ft), Rock-fill Dam 27 m (89 ft)
- Length: Concrete Dam 138 m (453 ft), Rock-fill Dam 146 m (479 ft)
- Spillway type: Gate controlled
- Spillway capacity: 4.05 Cumec

Reservoir
- Total capacity: 0.02 km^{3} (16,000 acre⋅ft)

Power Station
- Commission date: 2001
- Type: Pumped-storage
- Turbines: 3 x Francis turbines
- Installed capacity: 5.25 MW (7,040 hp)
- Annual generation: 14.83 MU
- Website https://vidyut.andaman.gov.in/

Kaplong Hydroelectric Project (Kalpong Dam) is the largest dam of the Andaman & Nicobar Islands. Built across the Kalpong River at Nabagram Diglipur in the North and Middle Andaman district the dam was completed in 2001 and commissioned on 1 September 2001 by Shri M. Kannappan the Minister of State for Non-Conventional Energy Sources. The dam was executed by NHPC and run by Electricity Department of Andaman & Nicobar Administration was commissioned 15 months ahead of schedule.

It is a Rock-Fill and Concrete Gravity dam with an storage capacity of 15,270,000 m3 (12,380 acre·ft) and having a reservoir area of 1,.84 Km2 (455 acres). The length of Concrete dam on left fork is 138 m (452.7 ft) and the height is 34 m (103 ft) while length of Rockfill Dam on right fork is 146 m (479 ft) and the height is 27 m (88.5 ft).

Kalpong Hydroelectric Project has an installed capacity of 5.25 MW of electricity. It is the only hydro-electric project in the Andaman and Nicobar Islands. The project is expected to generate 14.83 million units of electricity annually for the people of Andaman and Nicobar Islands notably for the residence of Diglipur and its nearby towns. The production cost of electricity from the Kalpong project is merely Rs. 1.89 per unit at the time of commissioning.

== Technical Features ==
Particulars	Details
Catchment Area	Left Fork 10.7 km2 Right Fork 4.56 Km2
Maximum Water Level (MWL)	EL-209.40 m
Full Reservoir Level (FRL)	EL-206.80 m
Maximum Draw Down Level (MDDL)	EL-192.00 m
Capacity at FRL	EL-1527 Ha.m (0.02 Km3)
Length of Link Channel	300.00 m
Bed Level of Channel	EL-196.oo m
Intake Approach Channel	257.00 m
Intake Tunnel	2m x 2m D-Shaped
Length of Tunnel	127.00 m Dykes 3 Nos
Diameter of Main Penstock	1200 mm
Length of Main Penstock	650.00 m
Design Discharge	4.05 Cumecs
Power House Dimensions	31.5m x 13.5m x 10.0m
Installed Capacity	3 x Francis Turbine 1750 KW each
Firm Power	1430 KW
NRLD No.	AN15HH0002

== Gallery ==
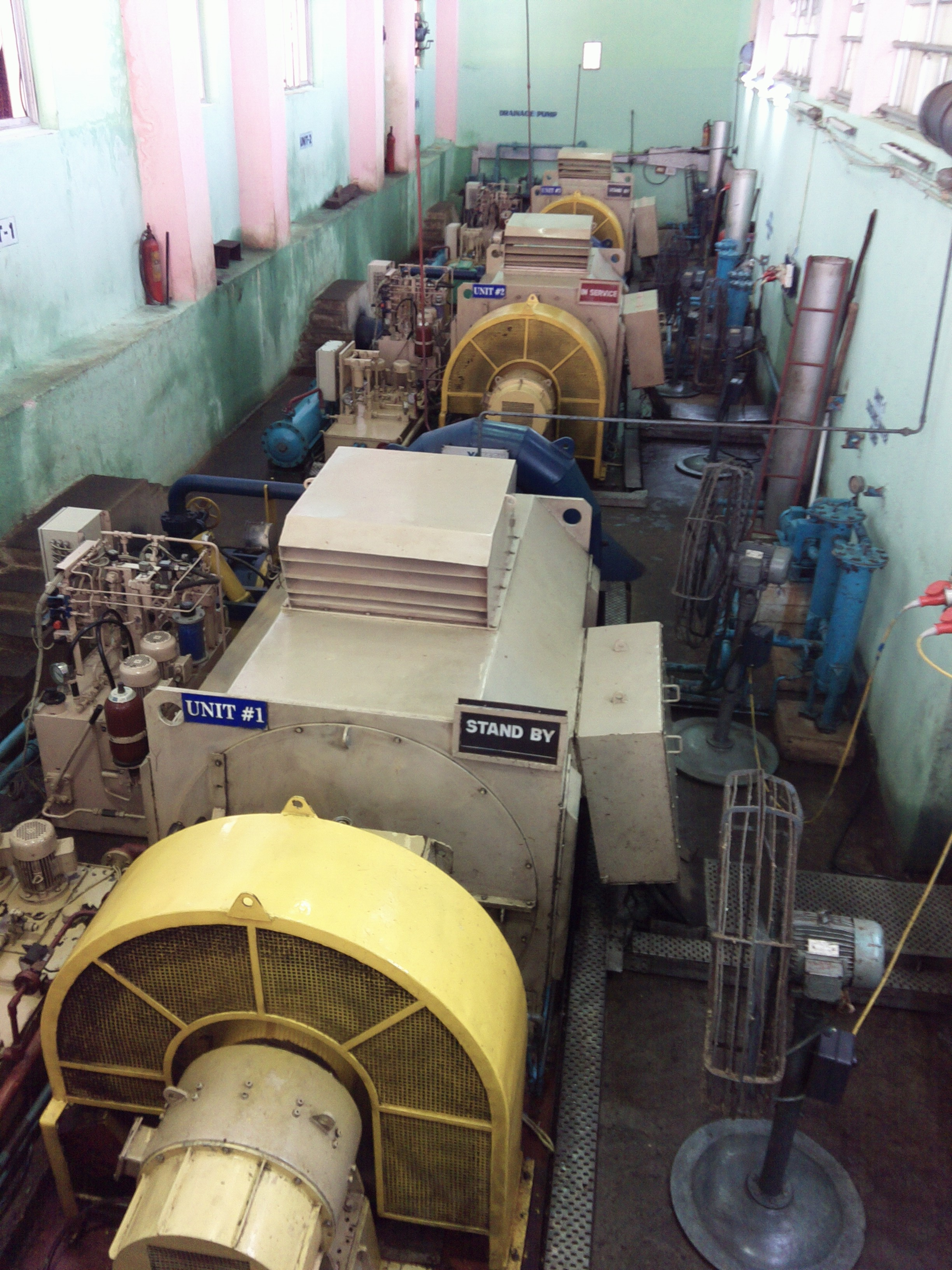
Generator House

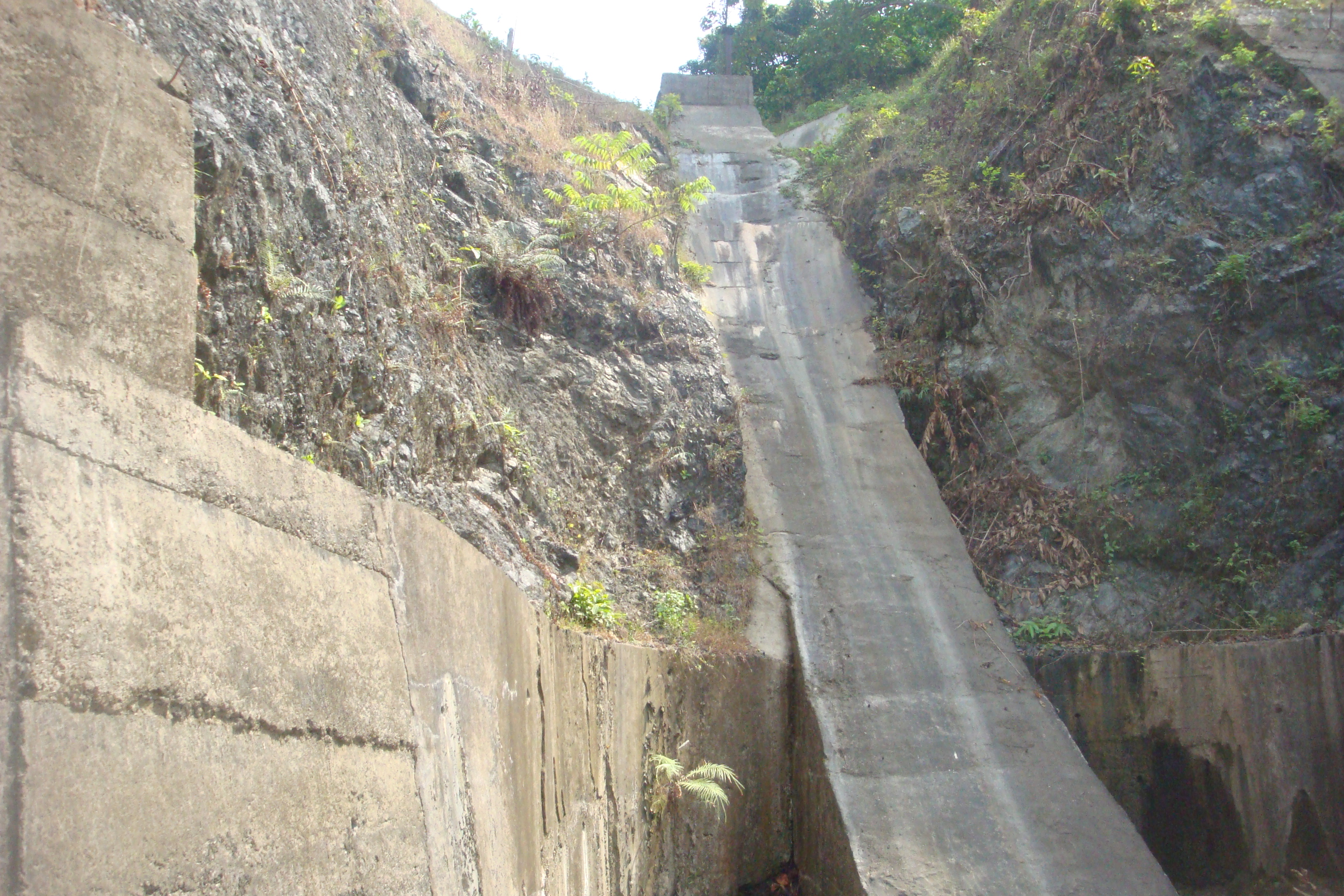
Penstock

== See also ==
- List of dams and reservoirs in Andaman and Nicobar Islands
- Kalpong River
