= Ross Island, North and Middle Andaman district =

Ross Island
- Location within Andaman and Nicobar Islands

Geography
- Location: Bay of Bengal
- Coordinates: 13.30°N 93.075°E
- Archipelago: Andaman Islands
- Adjacent to: Indian Ocean
- Total islands: 1
- Major islands: Ross
- Area: 0.315 km^{2} (0.122 sq mi)
- Length: 0.7 km (0.43 mi)
- Width: 0.9 km (0.56 mi)
- Coastline: 2.2 km (1.37 mi)
- Highest elevation: 82.6 m (271 ft)
- Highest point: Bopung Hill

Administration
- India
- District: North and Middle Andaman
- Island group: Andaman Islands
- Island sub-group: Aerial Bay Islands
- Taluk: Diglipur Taluk

Demographics
- Population: 0 (2011)
- Pop. density: 0/km^{2} (0/sq mi)
- Ethnic groups: Hindu, Andamanese

Additional information
- Time zone: IST (UTC+5:30)
- PIN: 744202
- Telephone code: 031927
- ISO code: IN-AN-00
- Official website: www.and.nic.in
- Literacy: 71.8%
- Avg. summer temperature: 30.2 °C (86.4 °F)
- Avg. winter temperature: 23.0 °C (73.4 °F)
- Sex ratio: 1.2♂/♀
- Census Code: 35.639.0004
- Official Languages: Hindi, English

Ross Island is an island of the Andaman Islands. It belongs to the North and Middle Andaman administrative district, part of the Indian union territory of Andaman and Nicobar Islands.

== Geography ==
The island is located in Aerial Bay, near Diglipur, and is part of Aerial Bay Islands.

== Administration ==
Ross Island, along neighbouring Aerial Bay Islands, is part of Diglipur Taluk.

== Tourism ==
The lighthouse on the island was commissioned in 1973, on the slopes of Bopung Hill at an altitude of 40 metres (130 feet).

== See also ==
- Daniel Ross
