= Madhupur, Diglipur =

Madhpur
- village
- Location within India
- Coordinates: 13°15′57″N 92°57′9″E
- Country: India
- Union Territory: Andaman and Nicobar Islands
- District: North and Middle Andaman
- Block: Diglipur

Population (2008-09)
  - Total: 2,844
- Time zone: UTC+5:30 (IST)

Madhupur is a panchayat village located in the Diglipur block of Andaman and Nicobar Islands in India.

Madhupur is located 185 km from Port Blair. The nearest towns are Mayabunder (50 km) and Rangat (90 km). In 2008-09, its population was 2844.

The villages under the Madhupur panchayat jurisdiction include Deshbandhugram, Madhupur and Rabindrapally.
