= Colebrooke Island =

Island of the Andaman Islands

- Location within Andaman and Nicobar Islands

Geography
- Location: Bay of Bengal
- Coordinates: 12.24°N 92.90°E
- Archipelago: Andaman Islands
- Adjacent to: Indian Ocean
- Area: 10.45 km^{2} (4.03 sq mi)
- Length: 3.2 km (1.99 mi)
- Width: 4.3 km (2.67 mi)
- Coastline: 23.5 km (14.6 mi)
- Highest elevation: 0 m (0 ft)

Administration
- India
- District: North and Middle Andaman
- Island group: Andaman Islands
- Island sub-group: East Baratang Group
- Taluk: Rangat Taluk

Demographics
- Population: 0 (2016)

Additional information
- Time zone: IST (UTC+5:30)
- PIN: 744203
- Telephone code: 031927
- ISO code: IN-AN-00
- Official website: www.and.nic.in
- Literacy: 84.4%
- Avg. summer temperature: 30.2 °C (86.4 °F)
- Avg. winter temperature: 23.0 °C (73.4 °F)
- Sex ratio: 1.2♂/♀
- Census Code: 35.639.0004
- Official Languages: Hindi, English

Colebrooke Island is an island of the Andaman Islands. It belongs to the North and Middle Andaman administrative district, part of the Indian union territory of Andaman and Nicobar Islands. The island lies 63 km (39 mi) north from Port Blair. It is named after Robert Hyde Colebrooke who surveyed the region along with Archibald Blair.

== Geography ==
The island belongs to the East Baratang Group and lies east of Baratang.

== Administration ==
Politically, Colebrooke Island, along neighboring East Baratang Group, is part of Rangat Taluk.
