= South Andaman Island =

Indian island in the Indian Ocean

South Andaman
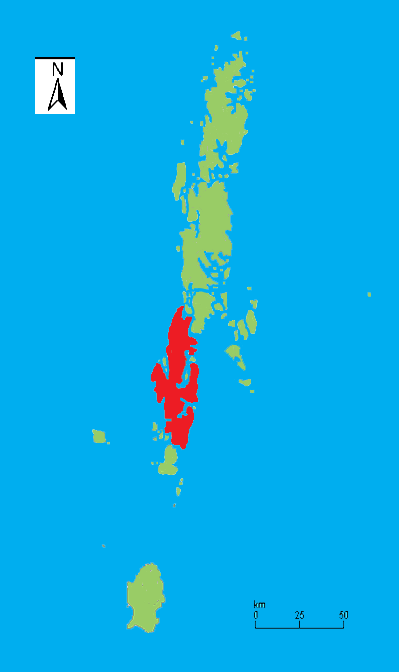
- Outline map of the Andaman Islands, with the location of South Andaman Island highlighted (in red)

- Location within Andaman and Nicobar Islands Location within India

Geography
- Location: Bay of Bengal
- Coordinates: 11.783333°N 92.65°E
- Archipelago: Andaman Islands
- Adjacent to: Indian Ocean
- Area: 1,262 km^{2} (487 sq mi)
- Length: 83 km (51.6 mi)
- Width: 28 km (17.4 mi)
- Coastline: 413 km (256.6 mi)
- Highest elevation: 459 m (1506 ft)
- Highest point: Mount Koyob

Administration
- India
- District: South Andaman
- Island group: Andaman Islands
- Island sub-group: Great Andaman
- Tehsil: Ferrargunj Tehsil
- Largest settlement: Sri Vijaya Puram (pop. 100,000)

Demographics
- Population: 209,602 (2011)only villages on south andaman island
- Pop. density: 166/km^{2} (430/sq mi)
- Ethnic groups: Bengali, Telugu, Tamil, Malayali, Andamanese

Additional information
- Time zone: IST (UTC+5:30)
- PIN: 744202
- Telephone code: 031927
- ISO code: IN-AN-00
- Official website: www.and.nic.in
- Literacy: 80.6%
- Avg. summer temperature: 30.2 °C (86.4 °F)
- Avg. winter temperature: 23.0 °C (73.4 °F)
- Sex ratio: 1.15♂/♀
- Census Code: 35.640.00xx
- Official Languages: Hindi, English

South Andaman Island is the southernmost island of the Great Andaman and is home to the majority of the population of the Andaman Islands. It belongs to the South Andaman administrative district, part of the Indian union territory of Andaman and Nicobar Islands. It is the location of Sri Vijaya Puram, capital of the Andaman and Nicobar Islands.

== History ==
South Andaman Island was struck by the 2004 Indian Ocean earthquake, leading to many deaths on the island.

Historical population
Year	Pop.	±% p.a.
1901	11,139	—
1911	10,834	−0.28%
1921	10,940	+0.10%
1931	11,806	+0.76%
1941	13,091	+1.04%
1951	11,645	−1.16%
1961	30,084	+9.96%
1971	57,863	+6.76%
1981	99,571	+5.58%
1991	157,141	+4.67%
2001	208,471	+2.87%
2011	238,142	+1.34%

== Geography ==
The island belongs to the Great Andaman Chain. Some areas of the island are restricted areas for non-Indians; however, transit permits can be obtained from the Home Ministry. South Andaman is the third largest island in the island group. It is located immediately south of Middle Andaman Island and Baratang, from which it is separated only by a narrow channel, a few hundred metres wide. The island is 83 kilometres (52 miles) long and 28 kilometres (17 miles) at its widest part. Its area is 1,262 square kilometres (487 square miles). South Andaman is less mountainous than the more northerly of the Andaman Islands. Koiob reaches a height of 459 metres (1,506 feet) above sea level.

== Administration ==
Politically, South Andaman Island has the tehsils of Ferrargunj and Sri Vijaya Puram.

== Demographics ==
Port Blair, the capital of the islands, is located on the southern part of this island. Other big cities are : Bambooflat, Prothrapur, and Garacharma. South Andaman had a population of 238,142 at the 2011 census. The effective literacy rate (i.e. the literacy rate of population excluding children aged 6 and below) is 89.13.

== Tourism ==
South Andaman plays very important role in the tourism sector as it serves as an entry point to the Andamans. There are many tour operators and travel agencies in Port Blair.

Demographics (2011 Census)
	Total	Male	Female
Population	209602	111980	97622
Children aged below 6 years	21498	10954	10544
Scheduled caste	0	0	0
Scheduled tribe	2553	1287	1266
Literates	168924	93717	75207
Workers (all)	85131	68143	16988
Main workers (total)	75885	61685	14200
Main workers: Cultivators	3054	2130	924
Main workers: Agricultural labourers	1229	1042	187
Main workers: Household industry workers	624	463	161
Main workers: Other	70978	58050	12928
Marginal workers (total)	9246	6458	2788
Marginal workers: Cultivators	412	293	119
Marginal workers: Agricultural labourers	613	465	148
Marginal workers: Household industry workers	181	103	78
Marginal workers: Others	8040	5597	2443
Non-workers	124471	43837	80634
