= Great Andaman =

Main archipelago of the Andaman Islands of India

- Location within Andaman and Nicobar Islands

Geography
- Location: Bay of Bengal
- Coordinates: 11.395°N 92.555°E
- Archipelago: Andaman Islands
- Adjacent to: Indian Ocean
- Total islands: 200
- Major islands: North; South; Middle
- Area: 4,823.5 km^{2} (1,862.4 sq mi)
- Highest elevation: 731 m (2398 ft)
- Highest point: Saddle Peak

Administration
- India
- District: South Andaman
- Island group: Andaman Islands
- Largest settlement: Port Blair

Demographics
- Population: 315,540 (2011)
- Pop. density: 65.4/km^{2} (169.4/sq mi)
- Ethnic groups: Andamanese

Additional information
- Time zone: IST (UTC+5:30)
- PIN: 744202
- Telephone code: 031927
- ISO code: IN-AN-00
- Official website: www.and.nic.in
- Literacy: 84.4%
- Avg. summer temperature: 30.2 °C (86.4 °F)
- Avg. winter temperature: 23.0 °C (73.4 °F)
- Sex ratio: 1.2♂/♀
- Census Code: 35.639.0004
- Official Languages: Hindi, English

Great Andaman is the main archipelago of the Andaman Islands of India. It comprises seven major islands. From north to south, these are North Andaman, Interview Island, Middle Andaman, Long Island, Baratang Island, South Andaman, and Rutland Island.

== Geography ==
South, Middle and North islands are the largest of the entire island group. The islands' capital, Port Blair, is located on South Andaman.

Great Andaman group is often considered the counterpart to Little Andaman Group, another group of islands in the Andamans.

The Andaman islands consist of four groups:

- Great Andaman
- Little Andaman
- Ritchie's Archipelago
- East Volcano Islands

Narrow creeks split Great Andaman into North Andaman, Middle Andaman, South Andaman and the other major islands. All of these islands are in the form of peaks of a submerged mountain chain. Each island has a central highland surrounded by bordering flat lands sloping in all directions and finally merged into coastal tracts.

== Demographics ==
According to the 2011 census of India, the archipelago had 315,530 inhabitants.
