= List of volcanoes in India =

This is a list of active, dormant and extinct volcanoes in India.

Name	Elevation		Location		Last eruption	Type
Name	meters	feet	Coordinates	State	Last eruption	Type
Barren Island	354	1161	12.278°N 93.858°E	Andaman and Nicobar Islands	2025	Stratovolcano, Active
Narcondam Island	710	2329	13.43°N 94.28°E	Andaman and Nicobar Islands	1681	Stratovolcano, Dormant
Deccan Plateau	1500	4920	18.51°N 73.43°E	Andhra Pradesh, Karnataka, Maharastra, Telangana	25 Mya (Million years ago)	Caldera, extinct
Baratang Island	532	1745	12.07°N 92.47°E	Andaman and Nicobar Islands	Active since 2003	Mud volcanoes, Active
Dhinodhar Hills	386	1266.4	23.45°N 69.34°E	Gujarat	500 Mya (Million years ago)	Extinct
Dhosi Hill	740	2427	28.06°N 76.03°E	Haryana	750 Mya (Million years ago)	Extinct
Tosham Hills	207	679	28.88°N 75.92°E	Haryana	732 Mya (Million years ago)	Extinct
Loktak Lake	768	2519.04	24.45°N 93.47°E	Manipur	100 Mya (Million years ago)	Supervolcanic caldera, status unknown

== See also ==
- Lists of volcanoes
- Craters in India
