= Saddle Mountain (Delta County, Colorado) =

Mountain in Colorado, USA

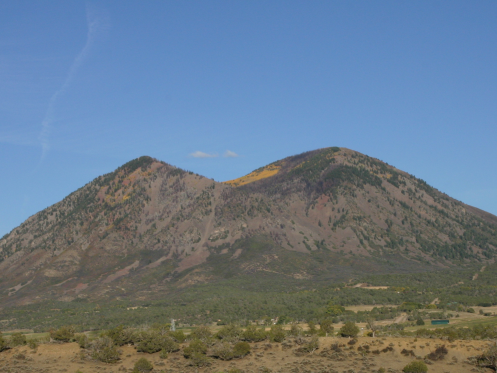
- Saddle Mountain near Crawford, Colorado in the West Elk Mountains

Highest point
- Elevation: 10,005 ft (3,050 m)
- Prominence: 1,565 ft (477 m)
- Isolation: 3.34 mi (5.38 km)
- Listing: Mountains of Colorado
- Coordinates: 38°42′19″N 107°30′57″W

Geography
- Location within Colorado
- Location: Delta County, Colorado, United States
- Parent range: West Elk Mountains
- Topo map(s): USGS 7.5' topographic map Crawford, Colorado

Saddle Mountain is a large, conical mountain located on the western side of the West Elk Mountains southeast of Crawford, Colorado. Topped off by North and South Saddle peaks, Saddle Mountain's highest point, South Saddle Peak, has an elevation of 10,005 ft (3,050 m) with over 3,000 ft (910 m) of vertical relief above the valley below. Although it has the classic shape of an extinct volcano, Saddle Mountain is an exposed igneous intrusion that geologists call a laccolith.
