= Kalpong River =

River in India

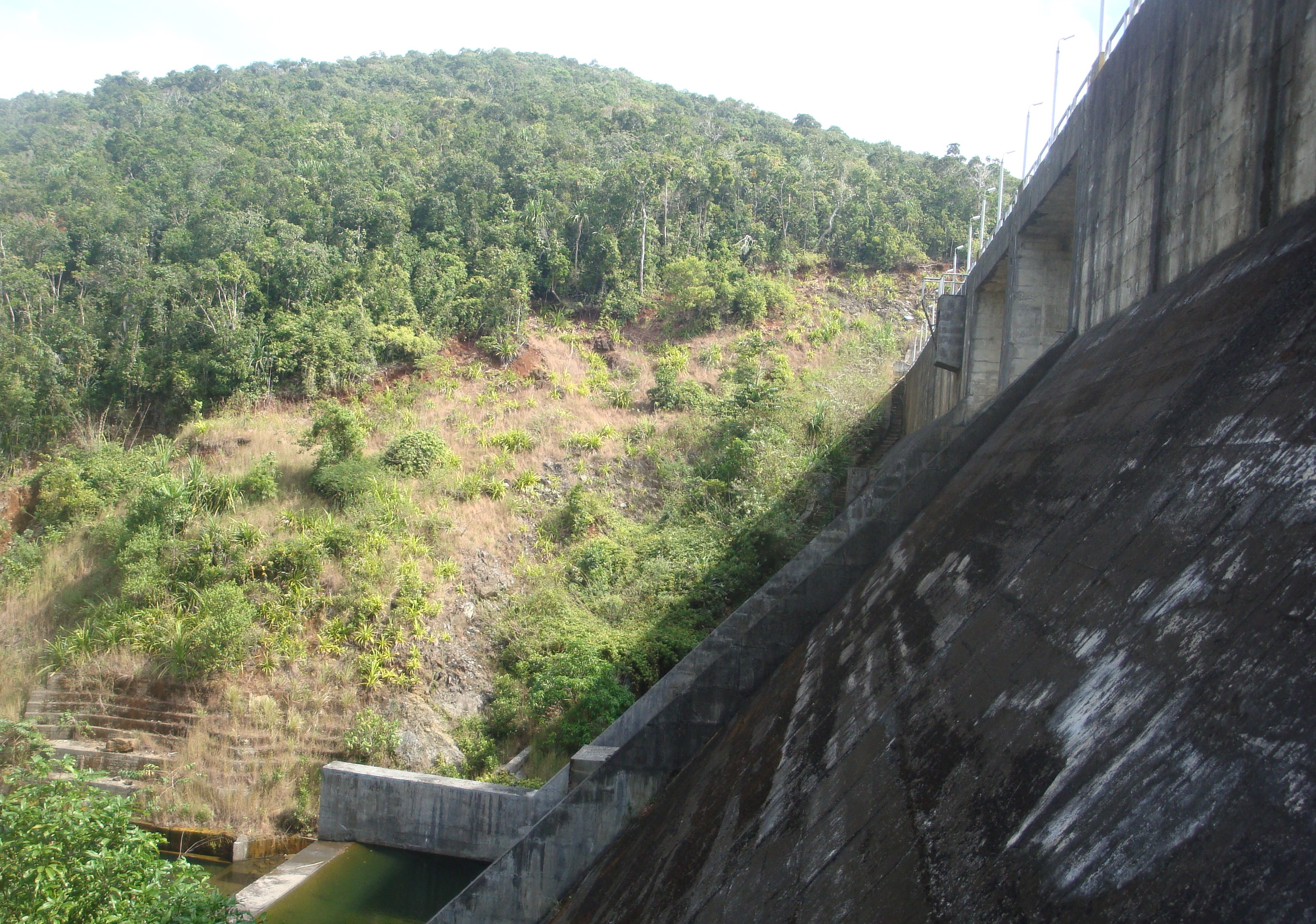

Kalpong River is a river in the North Andaman islands in the Andaman and Nicobar Islands. It originates from the Saddle Peak. The Kalpong River traverses in the northward direction for a length of about 35 kilometres before it joins the Aerial Bay Creek on the east coast near Diglipur. Kaplong Hydroelectric Project having capacity of 5.25 MW, the first hydro electric project in North Andaman is commissioned on the river. The project is expected to generate 14.83 million units of electricity annually.
