= Garacharma =

- Town
- Location in the Andaman and Nicobar Islands Garacharma (India)
- Coordinates: 11°37′N 92°43′E
- Country: India
- Union Territory: Andaman and Nicobar Islands
- District: South Andaman

Population (2001)
  - Total: 9,431
- Time zone: UTC+5.30 (IST)
- Climate: Am

Garacharma is a census town in South Andaman district just outside Sri Vijaya Puram in the Andaman and Nicobar Islands, a union territory of India.

== Demographics ==
As of 2001 India census, Garacharma had a population of 9,431. Males constitute 53% of the population and females 47%. Garacharma has an average literacy rate of 74%, higher than the national average of 59.5%: male literacy is 78%, and female literacy is 69%. In Garacharma, 12% of the population is under 6 years of age.
