= Baratang Island =

Indian island of the Andaman chain

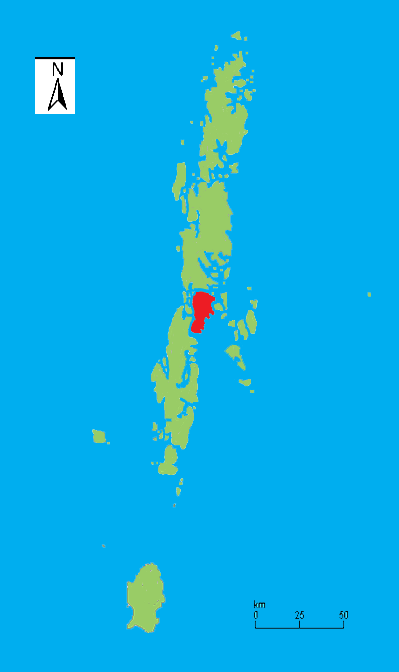
- Location of Baratang Island in Andaman Islands

- Location in Andaman and Nicobar Islands

Geography
- Location: Bay of Bengal
- Coordinates: 12.18°N 92.80°E
- Archipelago: Andaman Islands
- Adjacent to: Indian Ocean
- Area: 242.6 km^{2} (93.7 sq mi)
- Length: 27.8 km (17.27 mi)
- Width: 14 km (8.7 mi)
- Coastline: 117 km (72.7 mi)

Administration
- India
- District: North and Middle Andaman
- Island group: Andaman Islands
- Great Andaman
- Taluk: Rangat
- Largest settlement: Nilambur (pop. 1600)
- Divisional Forest Officer: Sandeep Divyajyoti Behera

Demographics
- Population: 5691 (2011)census 2011, only villages on Baratang
- Pop. density: 23.45/km^{2} (60.74/sq mi)
- Ethnic groups: Hindu, Munda, Khadiya, Chotanagpuri

Additional information
- Time zone: IST (UTC+5:30)
- PIN: 744202
- Telephone code: 031927
- ISO code: IN-AN-00
- Official website: www.and.nic.in
- Literacy: 75.4%
- Avg. summer temperature: 30.2 °C (86.4 °F)
- Avg. winter temperature: 23.0 °C (73.4 °F)
- Sex ratio: 1.05♂/♀
- Census Code: 35.639.0002
- Official Languages: Hindi, English

Baratang Island is an island of the Andaman Islands. It belongs to the North and Middle Andaman administrative district, part of the Indian union territory of Andaman and Nicobar Islands. The island lies 150 km (93 mi) north of Port Blair.

== History ==
The name baratang comes from an Andamanese word, referencing the bara tree and meaning "locality of our type of speech." Archaeological research at Hava Beel Cave and the midden at Wot-a-emi date occupation of the island to at least 1530 BP, or 420 CE.

Ranchiwalas (meaning 'Of the people from Ranchi' in Hindi) Island is another name for Baratang Island. Towards the close of the nineteenth century, the city of Ranchi experienced political upheaval due to the Munda uprising led by Birsa Munda. Many local Adivasis sought refuge by converting to Christianity with the help of the missionaries there. The British, realizing the future prospects of the forests of Andaman and Nicobar islands, sent the converts to Baratang Island to cultivate crops. The laborers from Ranchi settled there and made new lives for themselves. A lighthouse was commissioned in 1985 at the eastern entrance to the Andaman strait.

== Geography ==
The island belongs to the Great Andaman Chain, and with an area of 242.6 square kilometres (93.7 sq mi) it is one of the main islands of the group, a closely set archipelago in the Bay of Bengal, adjoining the Andaman Sea. Middle Andaman is to its north, and South Andaman to the south. Beaches, mangrove creeks, limestone caves, and mud volcanoes are some of the physical features. The islands of Ritchie's Archipelago lie 14 kilometres (8.7 mi) to the east. Port Blair, the capital of the Indian Union Territory of Andaman and Nicobar Islands, is located approximately 45 kilometres (28 mi) from the southern tip of Baratang. Baratang contains the only known examples of mud volcanoes in India. These mud volcanoes have erupted sporadically, with recent eruptions in 2005 believed to have been associated with the 2004 Indian Ocean earthquake. The previous major eruption recorded was on 2nd October 2025, that resulted in the destruction of the previous trail led out for visitors. The locals call this mud volcano jalki. There are other volcanoes in the area, the Barren Island volcano which is the only active volcano in South Asia, and the Narcondum volcano which has been classified as a dormant volcano by the Geological Survey of India.

== Administration ==
Administratively, Baratang Island is part of Rangat Taluk. Forest area of island is managed by DFO, Baratang.

== Transportation ==
The island is dissected by the Andaman Trunk Road to Rangat and Mayabunder. There are two ferry crosses: "Bamboo Trikery" Jetty and "Nilambur" Jetty. The Veer Savarkar International Airport in the city of Port Blair is the nearest airport located approximately 104 km (65 mi) away from the isle.

== Demographics ==
There are a twelve villages on Baratang, most noted are Adazig, Sunderghar, Nayaghar and Nilambur(HQ). According to the 2011 census of India, the Island has 5691 inhabitants. The effective literacy rate (i.e. the literacy rate of population excluding children aged 6 and below) is 100%.

Demographics (2011 Census)
	Total	Male	Female
Population	5691	2920	2771
Literates	4291	2321	1970

This island is inhabited mainly by the migrated Chota Nagpuri tribes.

== Tourism ==
Major attractions on the island include the limestone caves, the Mud Volcano, Parrot Island, and Baludera Beach.

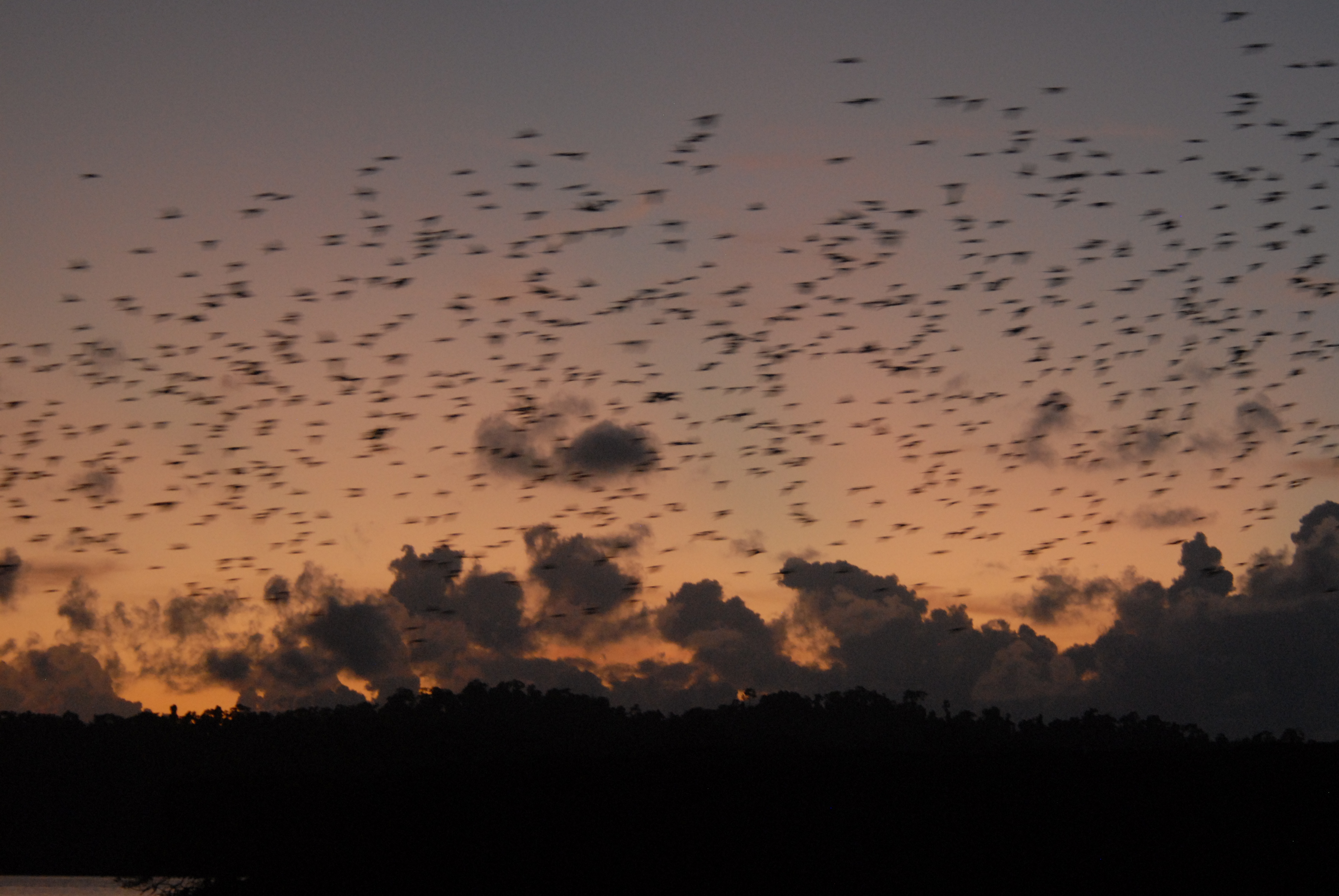
Parrot Island of Baratang

Places to Stay include the APWD inspection bungalow, Guest House of Forest Department as well as some hotels viz., Dew Dale Resorts and Coral Creek Resort.

== Image gallery ==
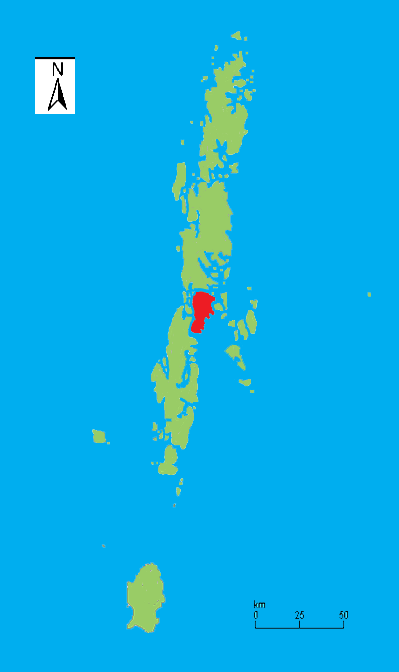
Location of Baratang

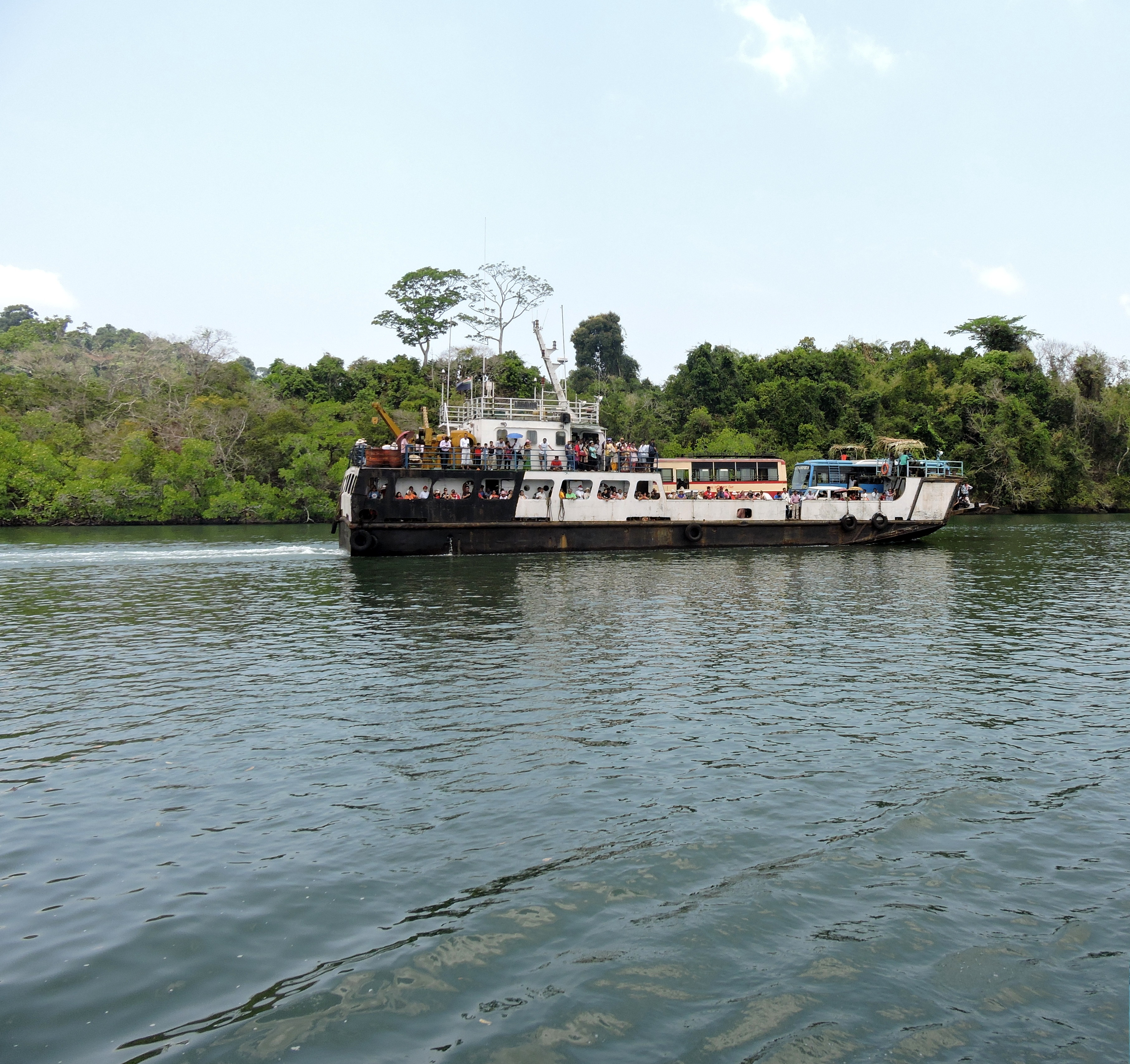
Ferry at Middle Strait jetty, Baratang

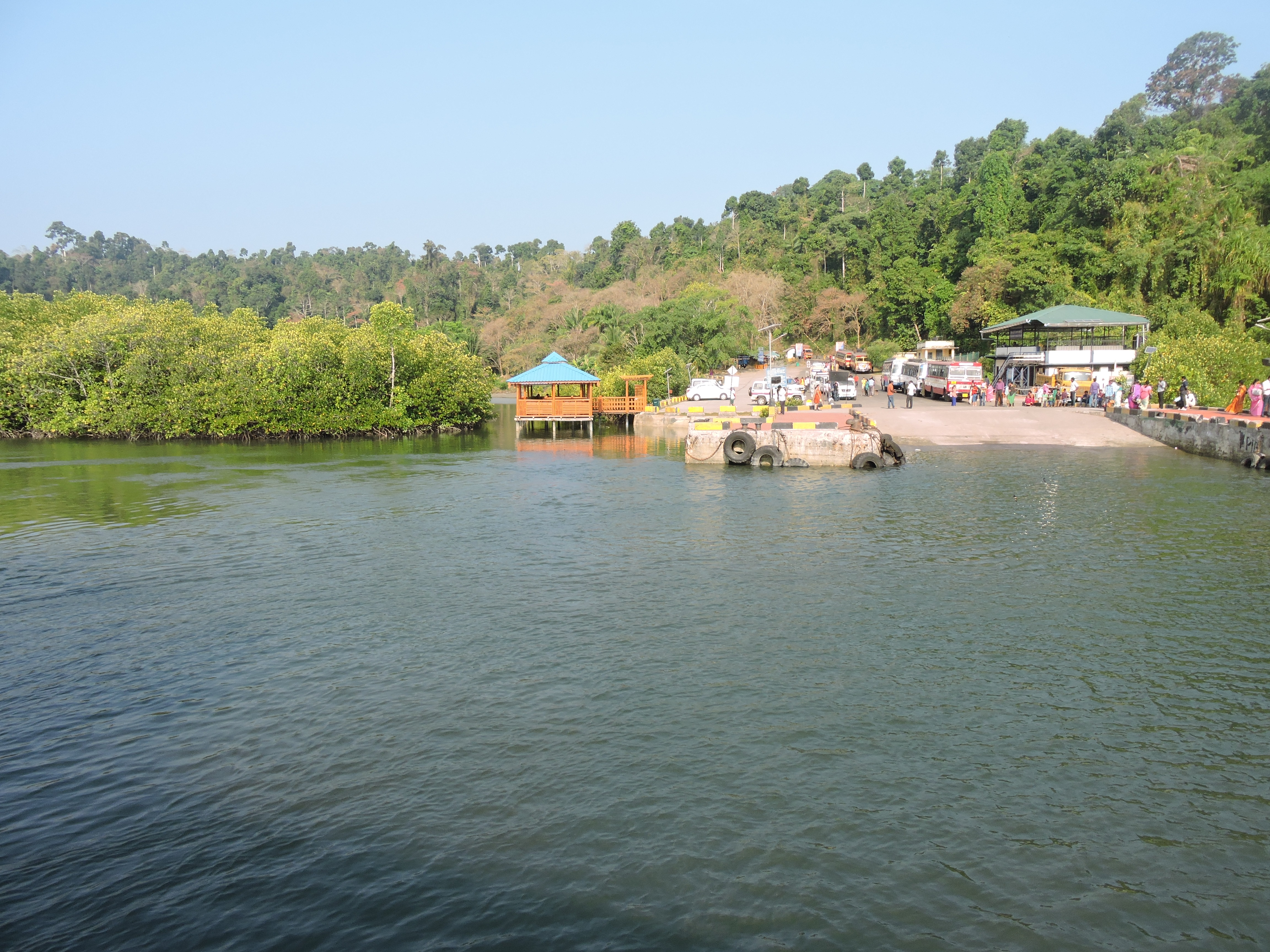
Baratang Island Middle Strait jetty

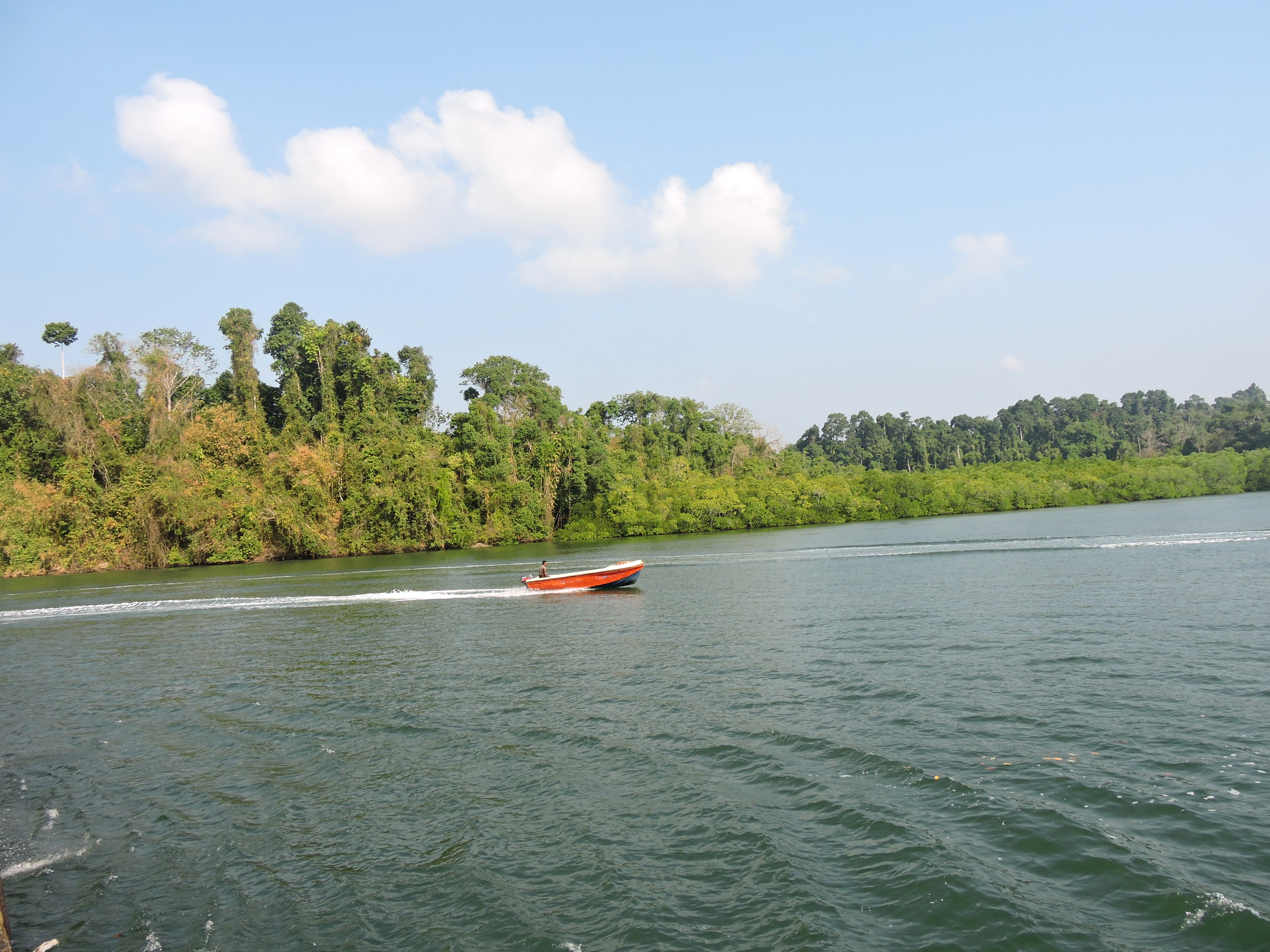
Baratang Island Middle Strait jetty

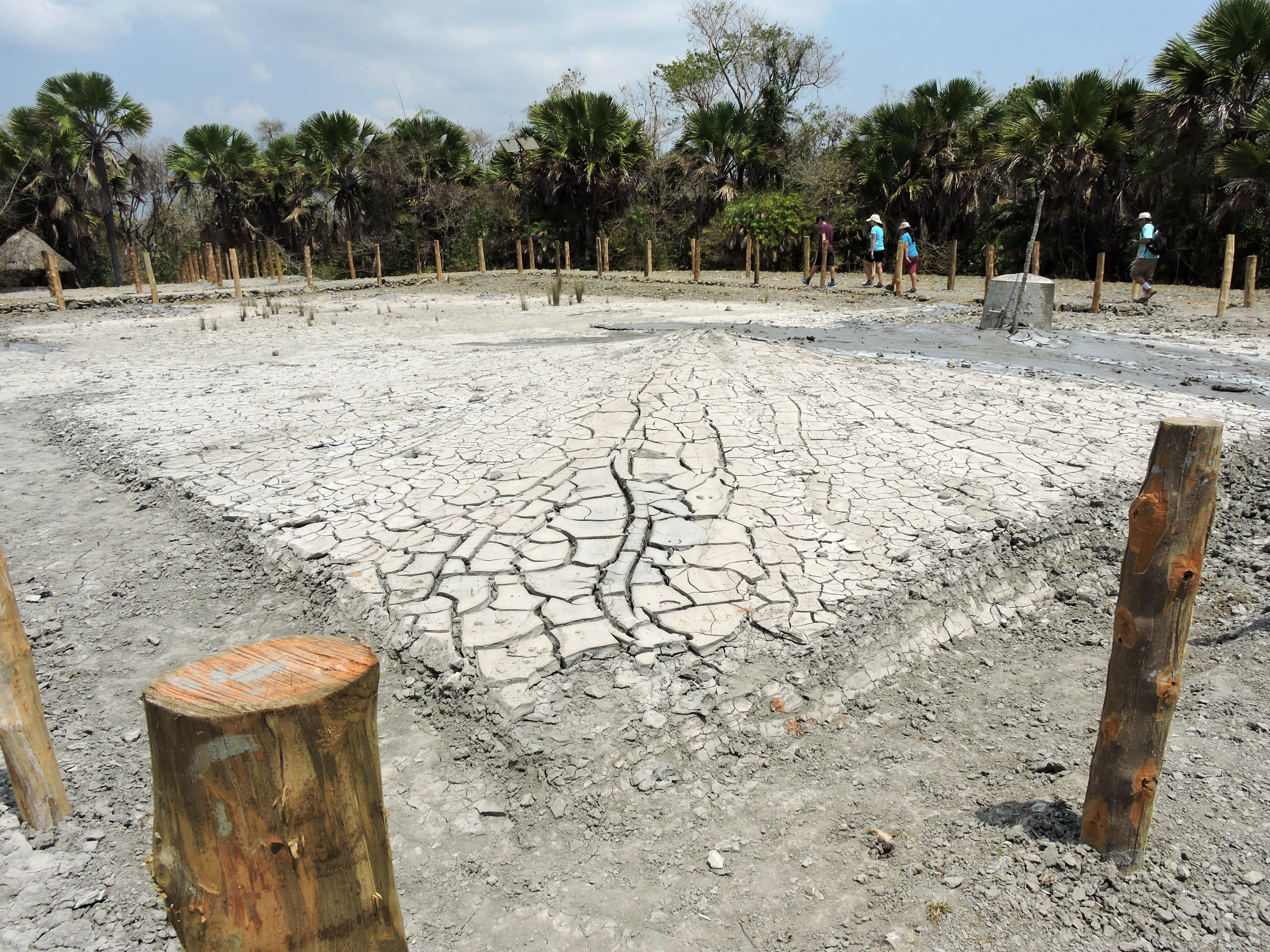
Mud Volcano of Baratang Island

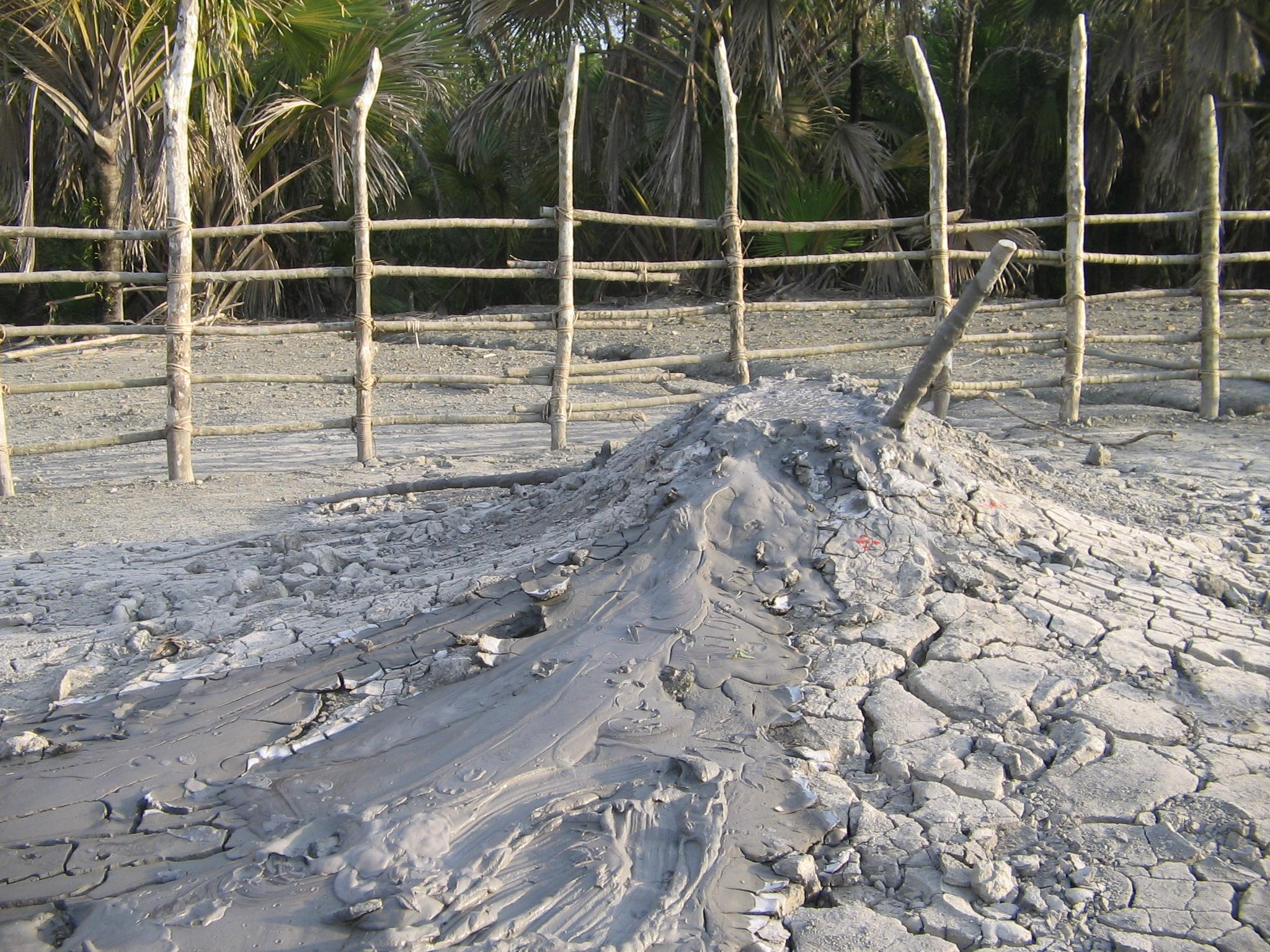
Mud Volcano of Baratang Island

== See also ==
- List of volcanoes in India
