= Saddle Peak National Park =

National park in India

Coordinates: 13°09′31″N 93°00′20″E

- IUCN category II (national park)
- Interactive map of Saddle Peak National Park
- Location: Andaman and Nicobar Islands
- Area: 32.54 km^{2} (12.56 sq mi)
- Established: 1979

Saddle Peak National Park is a national park in the Andaman and Nicobar Islands in India. It was set up in 1979 on the surrounding areas of Saddle Peak. Saddle Peak or Saddle Hills is located on North Andaman Island.

== Climate ==
It covers an area of 32.54 square kilometres (32,540,000.00 m^{2}). The climate here is typically oceanic. Temperature usually varies between 20–30 °C (68–86 °F). June to October is the rainy season.

== Fauna ==
Among the animals found here are the Andaman wild pig, Andaman hill myna, Andaman imperial pigeon, water monitor, dolphins, whales and the Saltwater crocodile.

== Flora ==
The Saddle Peak National Park is surrounded by moist, tropical vegetation as well as deciduous evergreen forest. The species Scolopia pusilla and Cleistanthus robustus are found in these islands that are not found in the mainland India.
