= Long Island (Andaman Islands) =

Island within Indian union territory

- Location within Andaman and Nicobar Islands Location within Bay of Bengal

Geography
- Location: Bay of Bengal
- Coordinates: 12.38°N 92.93°E
- Archipelago: Andaman Islands
- Adjacent to: Indian Ocean
- Area: 14.05 km^{2} (5.42 sq mi)
- Length: 8.7 km (5.41 mi)
- Width: 2.0 km (1.24 mi)
- Coastline: 23.81 km (14.795 mi)
- Highest elevation: 75 m (246 ft)

Administration
- India
- District: North and Middle Andaman
- Island group: Andaman Islands
- Island sub-group: East Baratang Group
- Taluk: Rangat Taluk
- Largest settlement: Long Island village

Demographics
- Population: 1032 (2011)
- Pop. density: 73.45/km^{2} (190.23/sq mi)
- Ethnic groups: Hindu, Andamanese

Additional information
- Time zone: IST (UTC+5:30)
- PIN: 744203
- Telephone code: 031927
- ISO code: IN-AN-00
- Official website: www.and.nic.in
- Literacy: 84.4%
- Avg. summer temperature: 30.2 °C (86.4 °F)
- Avg. winter temperature: 23.0 °C (73.4 °F)
- Sex ratio: 1.2♂/♀
- Census Code: 35.639.0004
- Official Languages: Hindi, English

Long Island is an island of the Andaman Islands. It belongs to the North and Middle Andaman administrative district, part of the Indian union territory of Andaman and Nicobar Islands. The island is located 80 km (50 mi) north from Port Blair.

== Geography ==
The island belongs to the East Baratang Group and lies east of Porlob Island.

== Climate ==
The island has a tropical monsoon climate (Köppen climate classification Am).

Climate data for Long Island (1991–2020, extremes 1952–2020)
Month	Jan	Feb	Mar	Apr	May	Jun	Jul	Aug	Sep	Oct	Nov	Dec	Year
Record high °C (°F)	35.1 (95.2)	36.0 (96.8)	38.1 (100.6)	40.7 (105.3)	43.1 (109.6)	37.6 (99.7)	37.6 (99.7)	36.7 (98.1)	38.0 (100.4)	35.6 (96.1)	36.0 (96.8)	35.2 (95.4)	43.1 (109.6)
Mean daily maximum °C (°F)	30.8 (87.4)	31.0 (87.8)	32.1 (89.8)	33.6 (92.5)	33.3 (91.9)	31.4 (88.5)	30.9 (87.6)	30.6 (87.1)	30.5 (86.9)	31.0 (87.8)	31.1 (88.0)	30.7 (87.3)	31.4 (88.5)
Mean daily minimum °C (°F)	22.5 (72.5)	22.0 (71.6)	23.0 (73.4)	24.9 (76.8)	25.5 (77.9)	25.0 (77.0)	25.1 (77.2)	24.8 (76.6)	24.3 (75.7)	24.5 (76.1)	24.6 (76.3)	23.7 (74.7)	24.2 (75.6)
Record low °C (°F)	16.0 (60.8)	15.1 (59.2)	17.3 (63.1)	19.2 (66.6)	18.2 (64.8)	19.4 (66.9)	19.0 (66.2)	18.0 (64.4)	20.0 (68.0)	20.0 (68.0)	18.6 (65.5)	17.2 (63.0)	15.1 (59.2)
Average rainfall mm (inches)	35.5 (1.40)	10.5 (0.41)	8.5 (0.33)	44.8 (1.76)	247.5 (9.74)	409.9 (16.14)	417.9 (16.45)	437.3 (17.22)	458.3 (18.04)	259.5 (10.22)	172.1 (6.78)	103.0 (4.06)	2,604.6 (102.54)
Average rainy days	1.7	0.4	0.4	2.0	10.8	16.1	17.0	17.6	17.5	12.8	8.1	4.3	108.7
Average relative humidity (%) (at 17:30 IST)	84	78	77	75	82	86	87	87	89	88	86	83	84
Source: India Meteorological Department

== Administration ==
Politically, Long Island, along with neighboring East Baratang Group, is part of Rangat Taluk.

== Demographics ==
There are three villages on the island: Long Village, Middle Village, and Lalaji Bay. Parkinson point (the northern tip of the island), was previously also inhabited. The island has its own power house, boat building yard, senior secondary school, bank, wireless facilities, hospital, Range Forest Office and police outpost. Long Island is an isolated settlement without any road network.

== Transportation ==
The island is reachable by boat from Port Blair, or from Rangat.

== Tourism ==
Merk Bay and Lalaji Bay are two beaches popular as a picnic spot in this island. The island is a good location for beach camping. The rest houses are mainly managed by the forest department. A visit to nearby Guitar Island is also popular.
