= Porlob Island =

- Location within Andaman and Nicobar Islands

Geography
- Location: Bay of Bengal
- Coordinates: 12.40°N 92.86°E
- Archipelago: Andaman Islands
- Adjacent to: Indian Ocean
- Area: 10.36 km^{2} (4.00 sq mi)
- Length: 5.4 km (3.36 mi)
- Width: 3.2 km (1.99 mi)
- Coastline: 19.37 km (12.036 mi)
- Highest elevation: 0 m (0 ft)

Administration
- India
- District: North and Middle Andaman
- Island group: Andaman Islands
- Island sub-group: East Baratang Group
- Taluk: Rangat Taluk

Demographics
- Population: 0 (2016)

Additional information
- Time zone: IST (UTC+5:30)
- PIN: 744203
- Telephone code: 031927
- ISO code: IN-AN-00
- Official website: www.and.nic.in
- Literacy: 84.4%
- Avg. summer temperature: 30.2 °C (86.4 °F)
- Avg. winter temperature: 23.0 °C (73.4 °F)
- Sex ratio: 1.2♂/♀
- Census Code: 35.639.0004
- Official Languages: Hindi, English

Porlob Island is an island of the Andaman Islands. It belongs to the North and Middle Andaman administrative district, part of the Indian union territory of Andaman and Nicobar Islands. The island lies 81 km (50 mi) north from Port Blair.

== Geography ==
The island belongs to the East Baratang Group and lies west of Kadamtala Beach.

== Administration ==
Politically, Porlob Island, along neighboring East Baratang Group, is part of Rangat Taluk.

== Demographics ==
There is only 1 village, located at the middle of the island, but it is now uninhabited. It is a woodcutters camp called Porlob depot which used to be populated each summer, until 2007 when it was closed.
