= Saddle Mountain (Arizona) =

Protected area in Coconino County, Arizona

Saddle Mountain Wilderness
- IUCN category Ib (wilderness area)
- Location within the United States
- Location: Coconino County, Arizona, United States
- Nearest city: Fredonia, AZ
- Coordinates: 36.3960955°N 112.0098593°W
- Area: 41,143 acres (166 km^{2})
- Established: 1984
- Governing body: U.S. Forest Service

Saddle Mountain Wilderness is a protected wilderness area managed by the Kaibab National Forest north of Grand Canyon National Park in the U.S. state of Arizona. Established in 1984 under the Arizona Wilderness Act, the area on the Kaibab Plateau includes its namesake summit, a prominent ridge shaped like a saddle that reaches an elevation of 8,424 feet (2,568 m). Elevations in the northern part of the wilderness on the edge of Marble Canyon start at about 6,000 feet and rise to 8,000 on the southern ridge which forms the Nankoweap Rim of the Grand Canyon.

Wildlife abounds as pinyon pine and Utah juniper support populations of mule deer in the lower elevations during the winter. The same deer migrate to the conifer-laden higher elevations in the summer. Among other mammals, a herd of bison still roams the area that was introduced in the early 20th century.

== See also ==
- List of Arizona Wilderness Areas
- List of U.S. Wilderness Areas
- Saddle Mountain (Grand Canyon)
