= Barren Island (Andaman Islands) =

Active volcanic island in the Andaman Sea

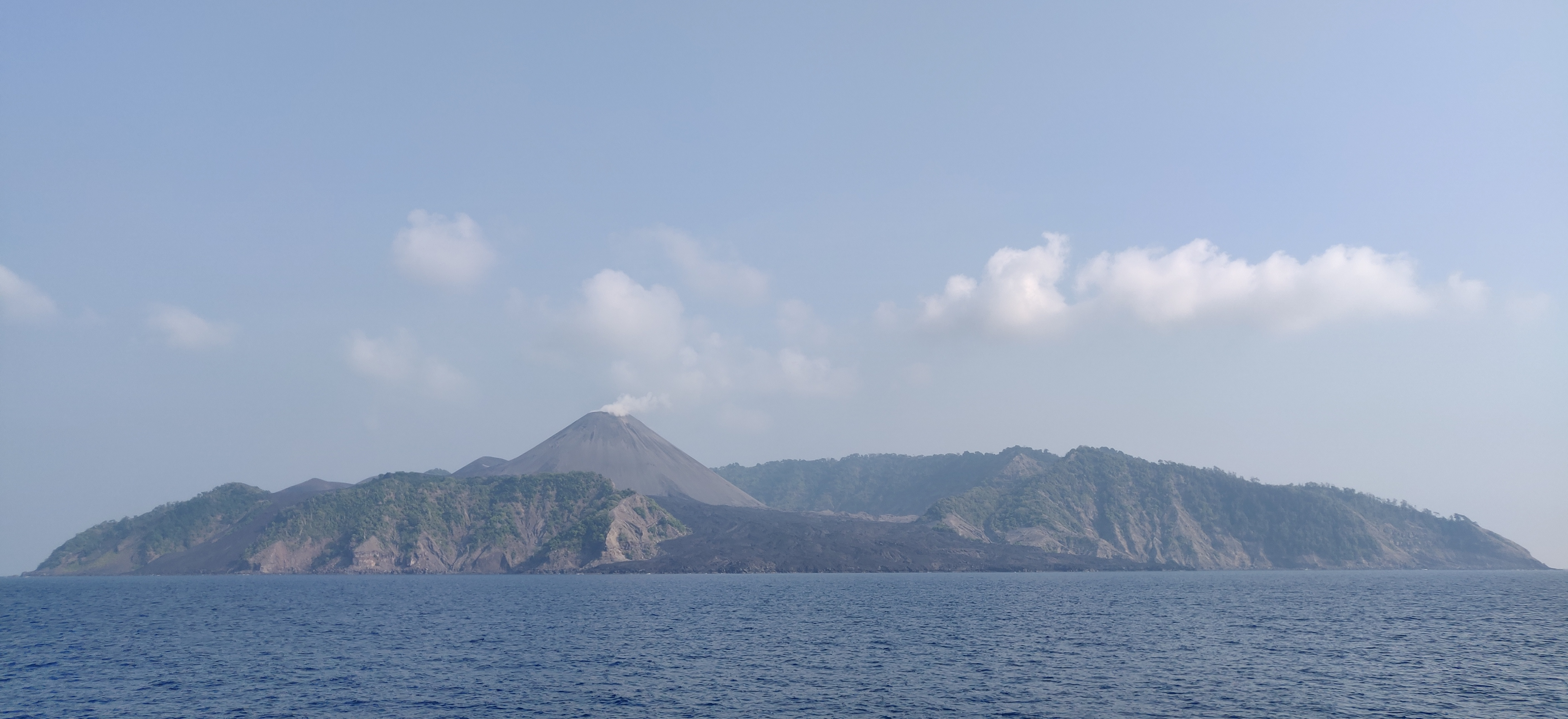

- Location within Andaman and Nicobar Islands Location within Bay of Bengal

Geography
- Location: Bay of Bengal
- Coordinates: 12.28°N 93.86°E
- Archipelago: Andaman Islands
- Adjacent to: Indian Ocean
- Total islands: 1
- Major islands: Barren Island
- Area: 8.34 km^{2} (3.22 sq mi)
- Length: 3.4 km (2.11 mi)
- Width: 3.1 km (1.93 mi)
- Coastline: 12.38 km (7.693 mi)
- Highest elevation: 353 m (1158 ft)

Administration
- India
- District: North and Middle Andaman
- Island group: Andaman Islands
- Island sub-group: East Volcano Islands
- Taluk: Rangat Taluk

Demographics
- Population: Uninhabited (2017)

Additional information
- Time zone: IST (UTC+5:30)
- PIN: 744202
- Telephone code: 031927
- ISO code: IN-AN-00
- Avg. summer temperature: 30.2 °C (86.4 °F)
- Avg. winter temperature: 23.0 °C (73.4 °F)
- Census Code: 35.639.0004

Barren Volcano
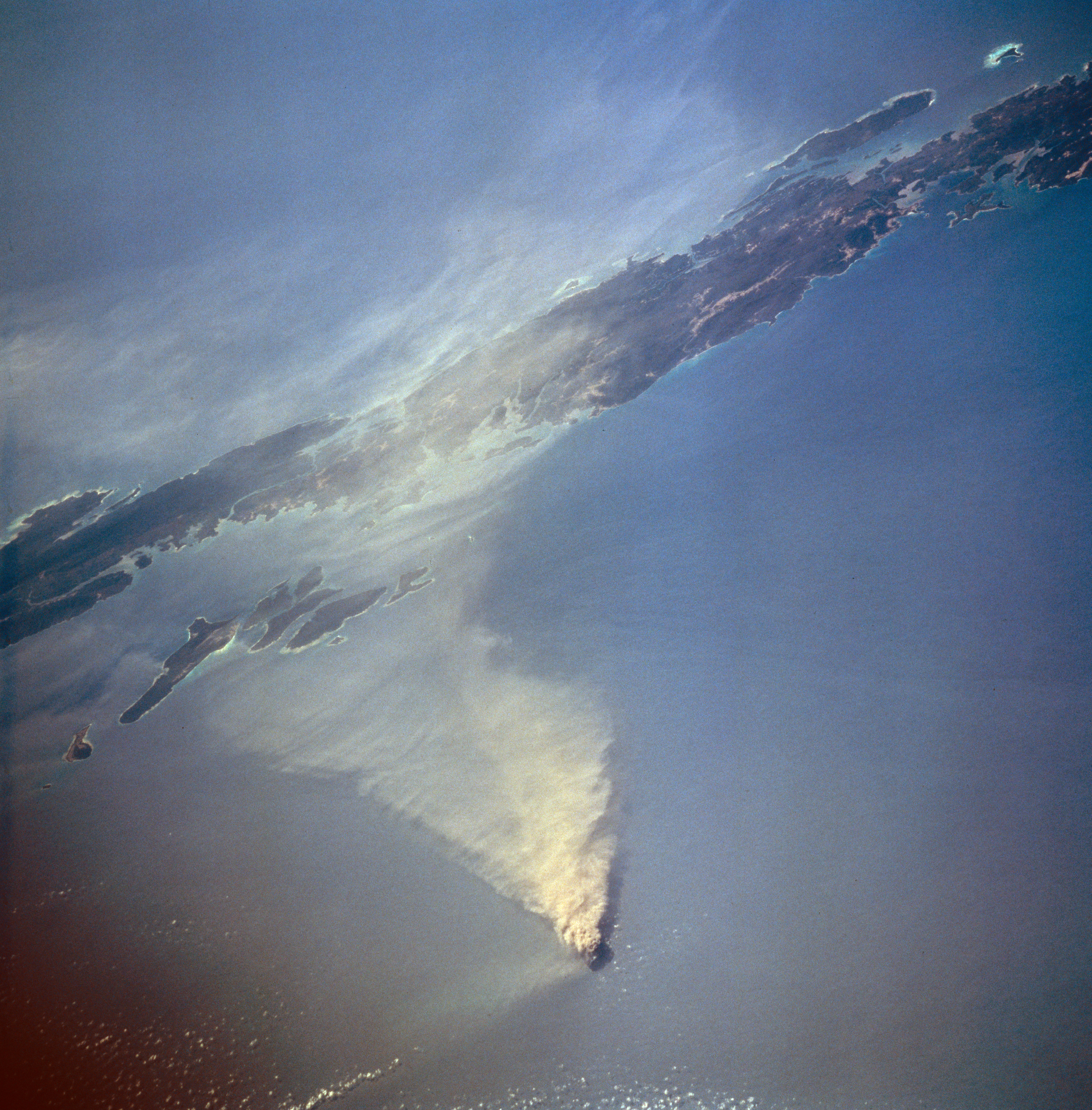
- Barren Island erupting in 1995

Highest point
- Elevation: 354 m (1,161 ft)

Geography
- Location: Andaman Islands, India

Geology
- Mountain type: Stratovolcano with pyroclastic cones
- Last eruption: 22 September 2025

Barren Island is an uninhabited island in the Andaman Sea. It is the only confirmed active volcano in the Indian subcontinent, and the only active volcano along a chain of volcanoes from Sumatra to Myanmar. It is a part of the Indian Union territory of Andaman and Nicobar Islands, and lies about 138 km (86 mi) northeast of the territory's capital, Port Blair.

== History ==
Based on argon-argon dating of samples from Barren Island, it is now established that the oldest subaerial lava flows of the volcano are 1.6 million years old and the volcano is located on an oceanic crust which is roughly 106 million years old. All recorded eruptions lie on the low end of the Volcanic Explosivity Index.

=== 1787 eruption ===
The first recorded eruption of the volcano dates back to 1787. Since then, the volcano has erupted more than ten times, with the most recent one being in 2025. After the first recorded eruption in 1787, further eruptions were recorded in 1789, 1795, 1803–04, and 1852. After nearly one and a half centuries of dormancy, the island had another eruption in 1991 that lasted six months and caused considerable damage.

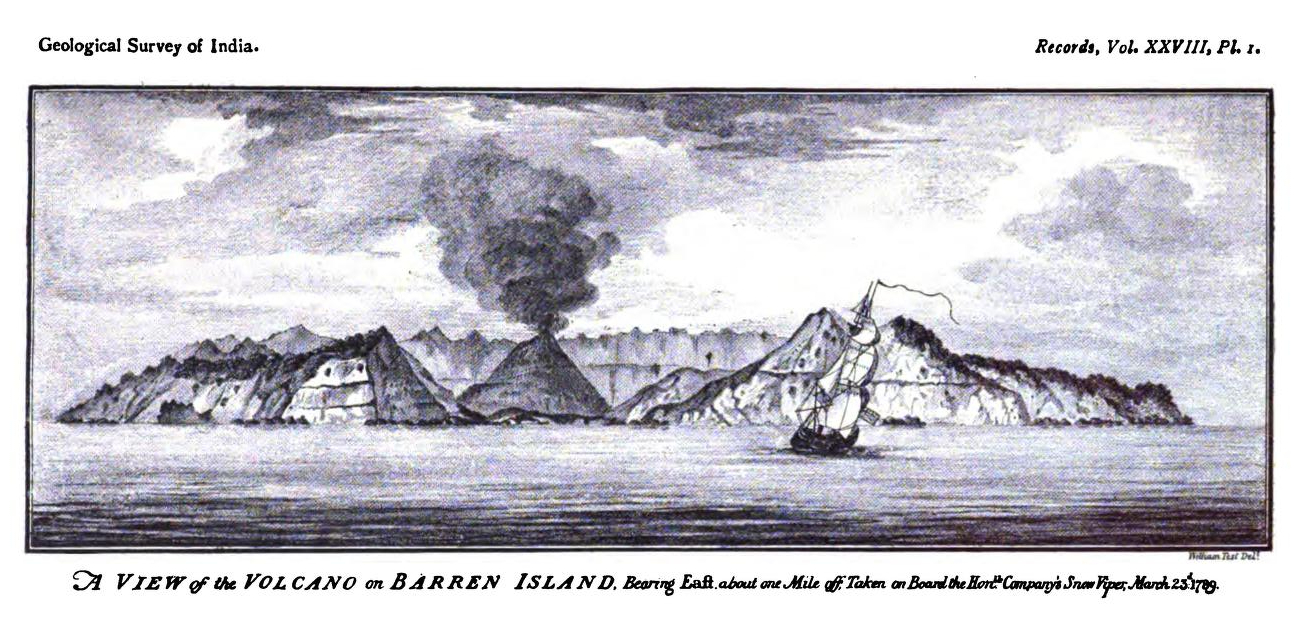
An illustration of the island in 1789

=== 1991 eruption ===
The 1991 eruption was particularly harmful to the island's fauna. A team from the Geological Survey of India visited Barren Island on 8–9 April 1993 to assess the impact of the eruption on the distribution, habit, and abundance of animal species. The report found that the eruption had reduced the number of bird species and their population. The team only observed 6 of the 16 known species of birds on the island. The pied imperial pigeon (Ducula bicolor) was the most abundant among the 6 species observed. In a survey conducted at night, the team spotted one rat species (Rattus rattus) and 51 species of insects from eight orders. The report also noted that the volcano was still emitting gas at the time. There were eruptions in 1994–95 and 2005–07, the latter considered to be linked to the 2004 Indian Ocean earthquake. A lighthouse that was established in 1993 was destroyed by the recent eruptions.

=== 2017-18 eruptions ===
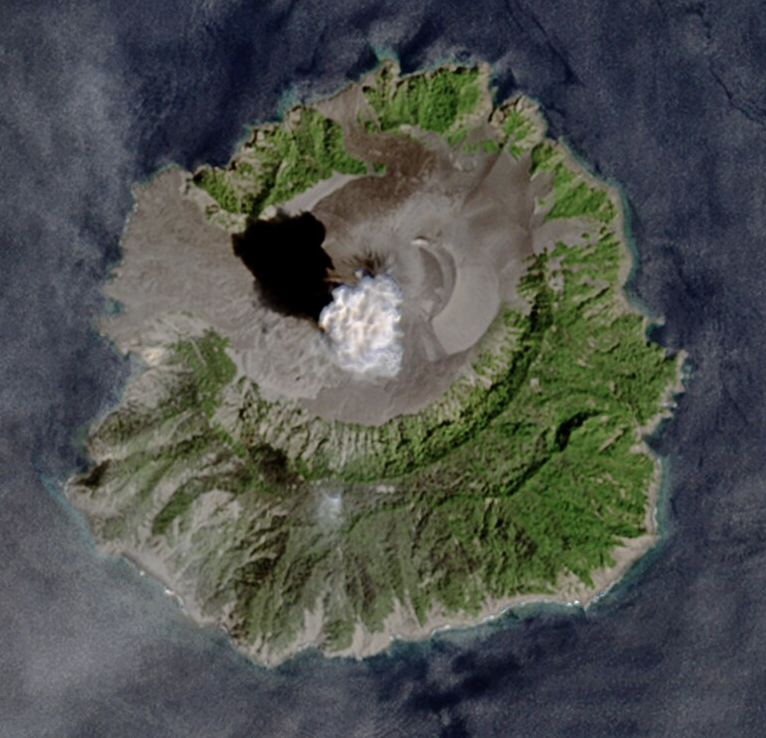
Barren Island (2019)

Eruptions were observed from 2017 to 2019. A team from the National Institute of Oceanography spotted the volcano erupting on 23 January 2017. Abhay Mudholkar, the head of the team, said, "The volcano is erupting in small episodes of about five to ten minutes. During the day, only ash clouds were observed. However, after sundown, red lava fountains were spewing from the crater into the atmosphere and hot lava flowed streaming down its slopes." The 2017 eruption was recorded as a 2 on the index.

=== Current activity ===
In January 2022, Barren Island entered into a new phase of volcanic activity. On 18 January 2022, The Darwin VAAC reported that during 5:00pm–11:00pm local time on 8 January and 12:00pm–5:00pm on 9 January, an ash plumes from Barren Island rose to 1.2 km (4,000 ft), and drifted W and WSW. Since then, the volcano has been in an almost constant state of eruption. In 2024, Barren Island would routinely create ash plumes that would reach 8,000 ft or more.

On October 2, 2025, explosive activity was reported. The Volcanic Ash Advisory Center (VAAC) Darwin warned about a volcanic ash plume that rose up to estimated 10000 ft (3000 m) altitude moving at 10 kts in NE direction. Satellite imagines confirmed the ongoing explosive activity.

== Geology ==
Barren island is the result of subduction as the Indian Plate is subducted under the Burma plate. Most eruptions are mafic magmas ranging from low-K basalt to basaltic andesite in a tholeiitic series. Andesite is minor and was erupted during prehistoric times. Phenocrysts are dominated by plagioclase with clinopyroxene and olivine, consistent with Sunda-arc basalts derived from a hydrated mantle wedge (subduction slab).

Compositions have been broadly stable from prehistoric times through recent eruptions. Chemistry of basalts in the 2005 lava flow are slightly more Mg- and Na-rich (and slightly lower in SiO₂) than 1994–95 basalts, indicating minor (within-series) variation rather than a shift in magma type.

Eruptions are mainly Strombolian to Hawaiian from a central scoria cone inside the caldera. The vent produces lava fountaining, short channelized ‘a‘ā flows, and small ash plumes. Phreatomagmatic lavas at the base of the edifice records earlier water/magma interaction. Historic activity (e.g., 1991–95, 2005–06, 2017–19) matches this style and chemistry.

== Administration ==
Barren Island belongs to the North and Middle Andaman administrative district, of the Indian union territory of Andaman and Nicobar Islands.

== Ecology ==
The island is a protected area under Barren Island Wild Life Sanctuary.

=== Flora ===
True to its name, it has large areas of barren landscape on the rim of volcano, but slopes have thick vegetation.

=== Fauna ===
It is uninhabited by humans, though it has a small population of goats. Additionally, birds like pigeons, bats like flying foxes and a few rodent species such as rats are known to survive the harsh conditions. When a small population of feral goats was also found on the island, it surprised the geologists. Later, it was found that goats were surviving on two fresh water springs and thick vegetation. These goats were brought here by British sailors from a steamer leaving Port Blair in 1891.

== Tourism ==
The waters surrounding Barren Island are reputed to be among the world's top scuba diving destinations. Major attractions here are the crystal clear visibility, manta rays, interesting basalt formations, topography of past lava flows and fast growing coral gardens. This dive destination is remote but can be accessed by either a live-aboard ship or with scuba-operators based at Swaraj Island.

== See also ==
- List of volcanoes in India
