= North Andaman Island =

Island in the Andaman Islands

North Andaman
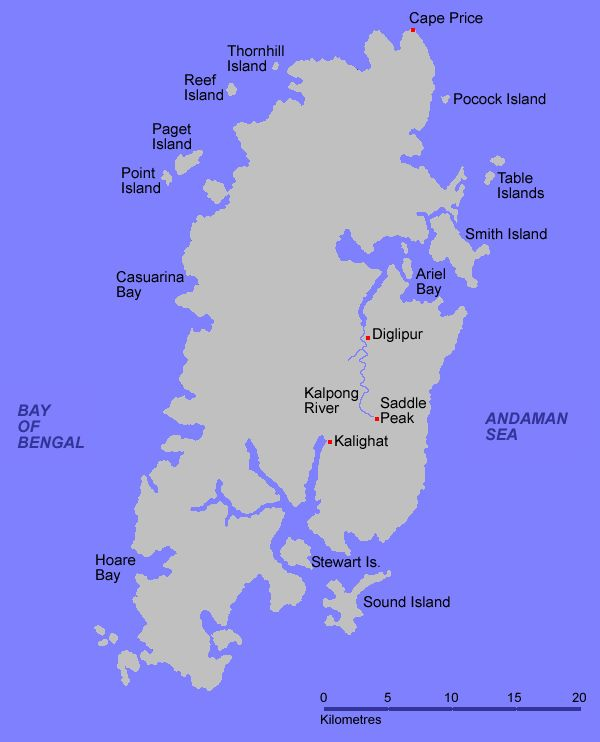
- Map of North Andaman Island

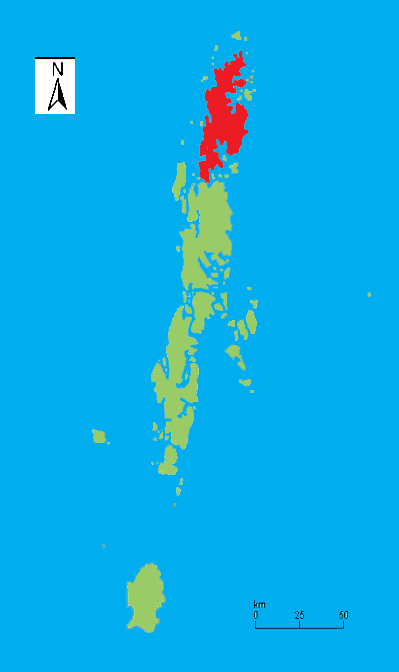
- Location in Andaman Islands

- Location within Andaman and Nicobar Islands Location within Bay of Bengal

Geography
- Location: Bay of Bengal
- Coordinates: 13.25°N 92.93°E
- Archipelago: Andaman Islands
- Adjacent to: Indian Ocean
- Area: 2,780.7 km^{2} (1,073.6 sq mi)
- Length: 80 km (50 mi)
- Width: 26 km (16.2 mi)
- Coastline: 366 km (227.4 mi)
- Highest elevation: 731 m (2398 ft)
- Highest point: Saddle Peak

Administration
- India
- District: North and Middle Andaman
- Island group: Andaman Islands
- Island sub-group: Great Andaman
- Taluk: Diglipur Taluk
- Largest settlement: Diglipur (pop. 15,000)

Demographics
- Population: 42541 (2011)
- Pop. density: 32.3/km^{2} (83.7/sq mi)
- Ethnic groups: Andamanese

Additional information
- Time zone: IST (UTC+5:30)
- PIN: 744202
- Telephone code: 031927
- ISO code: IN-AN-00
- Official website: www.and.nic.in
- Literacy: 84.4%
- Avg. summer temperature: 30.2 °C (86.4 °F)
- Avg. winter temperature: 23.0 °C (73.4 °F)
- Sex ratio: 1.2♂/♀
- Census Code: 35.639.0004
- Official Languages: Hindi, English

North Andaman Island is the northern island of Great Andaman of the Andaman Islands. It belongs to the North and Middle Andaman administrative district, part of the Indian union territory of Andaman and Nicobar Islands. the island is lying 137 km (85 mi) north from Port Blair.

== Geography ==
The island belongs to the Great Andaman group and lies north of Middle Andaman Island. Many small island groups surround its beaches. The island's main town is Diglipur.

The island previously had an indigenous population of the Great Andamanese, for example, the Bo, but they are no longer present: the island is populated by immigrants from the Indian mainland and their descendants.

The island is home to the highest point in the archipelago, Saddle Peak at 731 metres.

North Andaman has fairly frequent large earthquakes, and suffered inundation from the 2004 Indian Ocean earthquake tsunami.

== Administration ==
The entire island is part of Diglipur Taluk.

== Transportation ==
There is a small port at Durgapur, 6 km (4 mi) north of Diglipur, with regular services from Port Blair.

== Economy ==
North Andaman is known for its marine life: the island's main industries are rice- and orange-growing.
