= Aerial Bay Islands =

Islands of India

- Location within Andaman and Nicobar Islands

Geography
- Location: Bay of Bengal
- Coordinates: 13.30°N 93.03°E
- Archipelago: Andaman Islands
- Adjacent to: Indian Ocean
- Total islands: 10
- Major islands: Smith; Ross
- Area: 23.35 km^{2} (9.02 sq mi)
- Highest elevation: 131 m (430 ft)

Administration
- India
- District: North and Middle Andaman
- Island group: Andaman Islands
- Island sub-group: Aerial Bay Islands
- Taluk: Diglipur Taluk
- Largest settlement: Smith (pop. 260)

Demographics
- Population: 600 (2011)
- Pop. density: 25.7/km^{2} (66.6/sq mi)
- Ethnic groups: Hindu, Andamanese

Additional information
- Time zone: IST (UTC+5:30)
- PIN: 744202
- Telephone code: 031927
- ISO code: IN-AN-00
- Official website: www.and.nic.in
- Literacy: 71.8%
- Avg. summer temperature: 30.2 °C (86.4 °F)
- Avg. winter temperature: 23.0 °C (73.4 °F)
- Sex ratio: 1.2♂/♀
- Census Code: 35.639.0004
- Official Languages: Hindi, English

The Aerial Bay Islands are a group of islands in Aerial Bay in the Andaman Islands. This group belongs to the North and Middle Andaman administrative district, part of the Indian union territory of Andaman and Nicobar Islands. Smith Island is the largest and only inhabited one.

== Geography ==
Other major islands are Chatham island, Ross Island, Ox Island.

== Administration ==
The Aerial Bay Islands, is part of Diglipur Taluk.

== Demographics ==
There are 3 villages on Smith island, with a population of 600.
