= Saddle Peak (Andaman Islands) =

Peak on North Andaman Island, India

Coordinates: 13.158388°N 93.006134°E

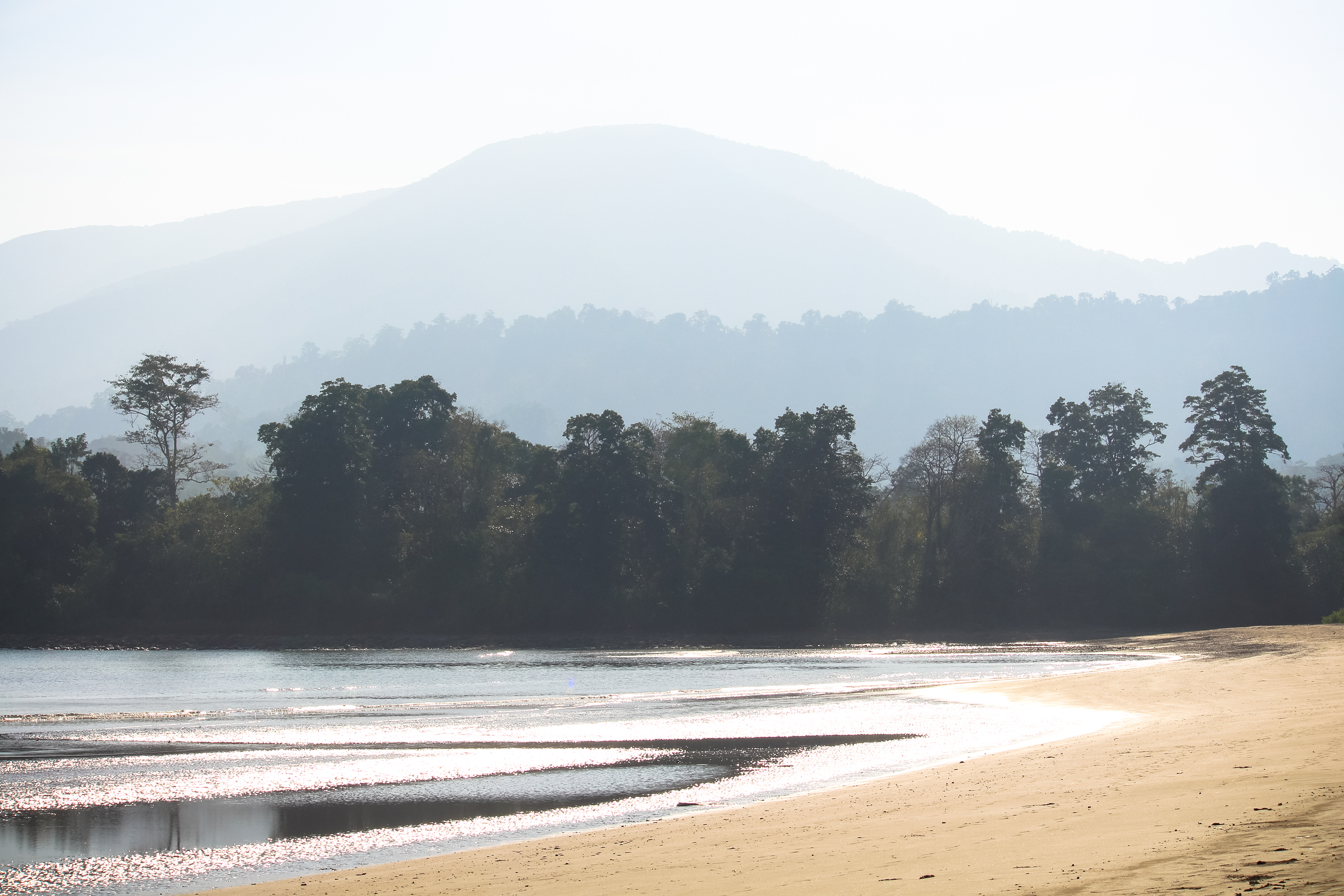

Geography
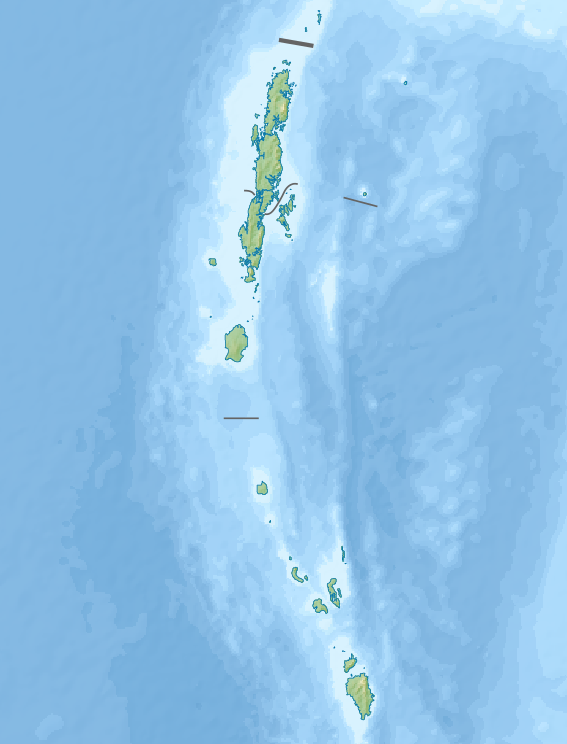
- Location within Andaman and Nicobar Islands
- Location: Great Nicobar Island, Nicobar Islands
- Country: India
- Union territory: Andaman and Nicobar Islands

Saddle Peak or Saddle Hill is located on North Andaman Island in India's Andaman and Nicobar Islands. At 732 m, it is the highest point of the archipelago in the Bay of Bengal. Asper Geologists & Volcanists it is a Dormant Volcano with last eruption in 50-100 BC.

The peak is located close to the east coast. It is surrounded by Saddle Peak National Park. It is located to the south of Diglipur and to the southwest of Kalipur Beach. A scenic viewpoint, Mehendi Tikrey View Point, is located just to the east of the peak, and a reservoir, Kalpong Dam, is located just to the peak's west.
