= Diglipur =

Diglipur Thitaumul Diglipore
- Location in the Andaman and Nicobar Islands, and in the Bay of Bengal Diglipur (India) Diglipur (Bay of Bengal)
- Country: India
- Union Territory: Andaman and Nicobar Islands
- District: North and Middle Andaman

Population (2001)
  - Total: 42,877
  - Density: 49/km^{2} (130/sq mi)

Languages
  - Official: English and Hindi
- Time zone: UTC+5:30 (IST)
- PIN: 744202
- Sex ratio: 911 ♂/♀
- Climate: Am

Diglipur (sometimes spelled Diglipore) is the largest town of North Andaman Island, in the Andaman Archipelago, India. It is located on the southern side of Aerial Bay, at 43 metres (141 feet) above sea level, 298 kilometres (185 miles) north of Port Blair. It is crossed by the Kalpong River, the only river of the Andaman islands. Saddle Peak, the highest point in the archipelago, lies about 10 km to the south. Diglipur is also a county (tehsil) of the North and Middle Andaman District of the Andaman and Nicobar Islands union territory. Its area is 884 km^{2}, and its population was 42,877 people as of 2001.

== Demographics ==
Populations

As per the population census in 2011, the total number of households listed under Diglipur tehsil was 10,702.

Total population of revenue villages			Sex Ratio	Population in age group 0–6 years			Child Sex Ratio	Literacy rate (%)		
Persons	Male	Female		Persons	Male	Female		Persons	Male	Female
43183	22599	20584	911	5174	2631	2543	967	82.24	87.36	76.58

Land utilization of revenue

Govt. Dept. (In Hect)	PRIs (InHect)	Settlers (In Hect)	Central Govt. Dept (In Hect)	Defence (In Hect)	Other than settlers (In Hect)	Area under encroach Ment (In Hect)
1.	2.	3.	4.	5.	6.	7.
1229.5019	25.7131	5547.5433	1.3500	136.2270	438.7730	492.0100

Area free from all encumbrances (In Hect)	Land under water/ Road (In Hect)	Forest / Grazing land (In Hect)	Total Revenue Surveyed area (In Hect)
8.	9.	10.	11.
6.0000	1137.52254	11450.28916	20464.9300

Languages

Bengali is the most spoken language in Diglipur tehsil. As of 2011 census, Bengali is spoken as the first language by 72.05 per cent of the tehsil's population.

Largest language populations in Diglipur are:

Bengali 31,113

Sadri 4,189

Kurukh 1,622

Hindi 1,485

Telugu 1,335

Tamil 1,314

Malayalam 791

Kharia 473

Munda 332.

Diglipur tehsil in 2011 census
1. Bengali (72.0%)
2. Sadri (9.70%)
3. Kurukh (3.76%)
4. Hindi (3.44%)
5. Telugu (3.09%)
6. Tamil (3.04%)
7. Malalyalam (1.83%)
8. Kharia (1.09%)
9. Munda (0.77%)
10. Others (1.27%)

== Infrastructure and services ==
Transportation

1. Road transportation: Road transport plays a vital role in the development of the Tehsil as a whole. Most businesses in the area are dependent on roads for commercial activities. Diglipur Tehsil is connected by road with the District HQ at Mayabunder. A large number of private and government-built buses are found throughout the Tehsil and provide routine services from Baratang to Diglipur via Rangat. Aside from this, private and government buses are also offering daily express service between Port Blair to Diglipur. Out of 34 revenue villages, 27 villages are connected by the Tarmac road, except for Sagardweep, Nischintapur, and Jagannathdera. The newly notified 4 revenue villages of Paschimsagar, Gandhinagar, Shantinagar and Ganeshnagar are also not connected with the Tarmac road.
2. Sea transportation: A jetty at Aerial Bay plays a vital role in the routine boat services from Port Blair to Diglipur with three to four trips a week.
3. Aerial transportation: Helipad at Vidyasagar Pally is the only infrastructure for air transport. Diglipur was formerly linked to Port Blair via airplane services, which has since been discontinued. Presently, Pawan Hans helicopters fly between Diglipur and Port Blair four days a week.

Healthcare and social services

Diglipur Tehsil has a community health center at Diglipur and primary health centers at Radhanagar, Kalighat, and Kishorinagar. Additionally, 14 sub-centers are in operation.

Altogether 113 Anganwadi, 4 daycare centers, and 2 Mini-Anganwadi are in operation within the Tehsil by the ICDS Project in North Andaman. Besides this, other welfare projects such as widower pension, retirement pension and disableds' pension are being provided by the Social Welfare Board through ICDS.

Postal services

One Sub-Post Office and 11 ED Branch Post Offices are in operation in the Diglipur Tehsil.

== Utilities ==
The island's water supply comes from the perennial Kalpong river, the only river in the islands. Though water supply has been sufficient, the construction of the hydroelectric dam has raised concerns about the sustainability of maintaining the present water supply levels. In some cut-off villages such as Nischintapur, Jagannathdera, Paschimsagar, Gandhinagar, Shantinagar and Ganeshnagar ring wells are the primary source of water.

Power supply to the island is generated by the 5.5 MW hydroelectric project of NHPC. There are three turbines and six generators at the Sitanagar Power House. The present power supply situation is considered satisfactory, with occasional power cuts due to stabilization problems in the plant. The present capacity is said to be sufficient to meet the power requirements of Diglipur, Mayabunder and Rangat islands. The Kalpong River project includes a 34 meter high concrete dam on the left fork of the river Kalpong, a 25-metre-high (82-foot) rock-filled dam on the right fork, a 257-metre-long (843-foot) in-take approach channel, and a 133-metre long in-take tunnel.

Services of GSM, 3G, 4G, broadband, WLL, landline and leased line are provided in the area. There is a satellite and OFC connection between Port Blair to Diglipur. Mobile net coverage is found in more populated areas, whereas fixed-line and broadband services can be accessed in remote areas.

Disaster management

As a measure to counter disasters, the following government buildings have been designated as an immediate temporary relief shelter in each revenue village.

Details of the village wise identified relief shelter is as under:-

Sl.No	Name of village	Identified immediate temporary relief shelter
1.	Ramnagar	Govt. Secondary School
2.	Jaganathdera	Govt. Primary School
3.	Kalighat	Govt. Sr. Sec. School
4.	Nishchintapur	Govt. Primary School
5.	Nabagram	Govt. Middle School
6.	Madhyamgram	Govt. Primary School
7.	Kishorinagar	Govt. Sr. Secondary School
8.	Parangara	Govt. Sec. School
9.	Mohanpur	Govt. Secondary School
10.	Subhashgram	Govt. Primary School
11.	Diglipur	Govt. Sr. Secondary School
12.	Durgapur	Govt. Secondary School
13.	Shibpur	Govt. Secondary School
14.	Kalipur	Govt. Primary School
15.	Keralapuram	Govt. Secondary School
16.	Vidyasagarpalli	Govt. Primary School
17.	Aerial bay	Govt. Primary School
18.	Sagardweep	Govt. Middle School
19.	Madhupur	Govt. Sec. School
20.	Deshbandhugram	Govt. Primary School
21.	Rabindrapally	Govt. Primary School
22.	Laxmipur	Govt. Secondary School
23.	Radhanagar	Govt. Primary School
24.	Swarajgram	Govt. Sr. Secondary School
25.	Shyamnagar	Govt. Middle School
26.	Milangram	Govt. Middle School
27.	Ramkrishnagram	Govt. Primary School
28.	Khudirampur	Govt. Middle School
29.	Sitanagar	Govt. Middle School
30.	Krishnapuri	Community Hall

== Education ==
The education services of Diglipur Tehsil are generally considered to be adequate. Within the Tehsil, 6 Government Senior Secondary Schools are in operation.

Data on the distribution of schools within the Tehsil is found in the table below.

Government school

Sl.No	Graduation of Govt. School	No. of School under Diglipur Tehsil
1.	Primary School	48
2.	Middle School	09
3.	Secondary School	09
4.	Senior Secondary School	06

Private Management Schools

Sl.No	Gradation of Private. School	No. of School under Diglipur Tehsil
1.	Pre- Primary / Primary School	05
2.	Middle School	01
3.	Secondary School	01

All these schools are running under Diglipur Sub-Division. Of these, ten primary schools and one secondary school are overseen by the assistant director. The enrollment of students is as follows (excluding schools overseen by the assistant director):

Enrollment in Govt. Schools – 8996

Enrollment in Private Schools – 1014

== Fishing ==
The Diglipur Tehsil has vast and varied fisheries in terms of species diversity of fish, ornamental fish, shellfish, and mollusk. A large part of the population is dependent on fishing and related activities for income. There are 514 registered fishing boats in operation, which provide a livelihood for 1200 active fisherman families. Besides marine fishery, people of Diglipur are also involved in culturing freshwater fish with more than 700 available ponds. The majority of people are non-vegetarians, and relish fish and shellfish cuisine as a preferred dish. Department of fisheries works for the welfare and development of fishermen and fish farmers, as well as for sustainable fisheries and aquaculture as a whole.

There is one landing center for fish at Durgapur.

There is one drying platform for fish at Durgapur.

There is one ice plant and cold storage for the preservation of fish at Durgapur village.

== Judiciary and defense ==
One police station is located in both Diglipur and Kalighat.

There are four defence establishments as given below:

Sl.No	Unit	Location
1.	Coast Guard (DHQ-9)	Aerial Bay
2.	2 U Det. (Navy)	Aerial Bay
3.	Naval Air Station	Shibpur
4.	Army Det.	Shibpur

== Agriculture ==
As of 2010, Diglipur's chief agricultural products were rice (about 6500 ha), coconuts (3600 ha), rabi pulses (2900 ha), areca nuts (1300 ha) and bananas (650 ha).

== Tourism ==
The city also profits from tourism to nearby attractions in North Andaman, which include the Ross and Smith islands, the Saddle Peak National Park, the beaches at Ram Nagar, Kalipur, and Lamiya bay, and mud volcanoes. Ram Nagar beach (15 kilometres (9.3 miles) away from Kalighat) is famous for sea turtle nesting from December to February. The present tourist inflow during a season is an estimated 1000, of which ~90% are domestic tourists and the rest foreign nationals. This translates to a low average of 6 tourists per day in season. The average stay period of a foreign tourist is typically 10-14 days, whereas domestic tourists stays only for 1–3 days on average

The Chalis Ek caves (about 20 kilometres (12 miles) due south of Diglipur, near the village of Pathi Level) and the Alfred Caves are a major nesting ground for the edible-nest swiftlet, whose nests are exported to China for bird's nest soup.

Mud volcano at Diglipur

The mud volcanoes at North Andaman are described by locals as more popular than those found in Baratang Islands. The mud volcanoes at North Andaman are located at a place locally known as Jal Tikry, near Hathi level, around 25 kilometres (16 miles) from Diglipur Bazaar. So far, the local administration has made no efforts to ease the accessibility of tourists to the mud volcanoes.

Ross Island

The small Ross Island, a 20-minute boat ride from Aerial Bay jetty, is an ideal spot for beach tourism, adventure (trekking through tropical forest), research / education (like scuba diving, snorkeling, turtle nesting). The sand bar joining this island with the larger Smith Island is an additional attraction. This island is not to be confused with Ross Island, South Andaman district, near Port Blair.

Smith Island

Smith Island offers a similar experience to the smaller Ross Island. Smith Island has a village of about 60 families. Eco rest houses are available for overnight stay. The beach is notable for turtle nesting during seasons.

Kalipur Beach

At a distance of 18 kilometres (11 miles) from Diglipur, one can find sand and rock shores, as well as a fishing village nearby. Lamiya Bay is quite near the beach. Kalipur Adventure Sports Complex offers water adventure sports such as speed boats and water scooters. Lamiya Bay Beach (or locally Lemiyar Bay) borders the Saddle Peak National Park. This beach has a stretch of shore covered with seashells. One can find a freshwater stream called 'Thambu Nali' in the foothills of the National Park.

Saddle Peak National Park

A dense tropical forest housing a rich bank of trees (including sandal), rare flora and wild fruits offers trekking opportunities such as climbing up the natural steps formed by the roofs of old trees. Tourists need to obtain permission from the Forest Department in order to traverse through the park.

A 740 feet climb leads to Saddle Peak, the highest point in the islands, offers an aerial view of the area. The second peak (called "ice degree peak") is the coldest point on the islands, while the third peak provides a view spanning from Diglipur to Mayabunder.

Local travel in North Andaman

For local travel STS buses as well as private buses are available. The public transport services run between the hours of 04:30 and 19:30. There are also around 45 cars, as well as a few jeeps/Omni Vans as an alternative to public transportation on the island. dinghy are also available for inter-island travel.

The inter-island boat visit to Aerial Bay departs three times a week on Monday, Wednesday and Saturday.

== Villages ==
In 2001, the townships (gram panchayats) and subordinated villages in Diglipur county were:

- Diglipur: Khudirampur
- Gandhi Nagar: Ganesh Nagar, Shanti Nagar
- Kalighat: Jagannath Dera
- Keralapuram: Vidyasagar Pally, Aerial Bay, Sagardweep, Gandhi Nagar
- Kishorinagar: Parangara, Mohanpur
- Laxmipur: Milangram
- Madhupur: Rabindra Pally, Deshbandugram
- Nabagram: Nischintapur, Madhyamgram
- Paschimsaga
- Radha Nagar: Shyam Nagar, Swarajgram
- Ramakrishnagram
- Ramnagar
- Shibpur: Kalipur, Durgapur
- Sitanagar: Krishnapuri
- Subashgram: Diglipur
