= Tamil Nadu diaspora =

People who emigrated from Tamil Nadu

The Tamil Nadu diaspora (Tamil: அயலகத் தமிழர் (Ayalakat Tamiļar)) comprises people who have emigrated from South Indian state of Tamil Nadu, (and other adjacent Tamil speaking areas) to other non-Tamil Indian states and other countries, and people of Tamil Nadu descent (and other adjacent Tamil speaking areas) born or residing in other non-Tamil Indian states and other countries.

== Early and Medieval migrations (before 1800s) ==
Many of Tamil emigrants who left shores of Tamil Nadu before 18th Century and mixed with countless other ethnicities. In medieval period Tamilians emigrated as soldiers, traders and labourers settled in Karnataka, Maharashtra, Sri Lanka, Thailand, Malaysia, Indonesia and intermixed well with local population, while few communities still maintain their language and culture. Many groups still claim descent from this era Tamil emigrants such as Kaikadis of Maharashtra, Thigalas, Hebbars of Karnataka, Velamas of Northern Andhra, Chittys of Malaysia, and few sections of Sri Lankan Tamils such as Sri Lankan Chetties, Bharatha people and Negombo Tamils.

== Modern Migration (1800 - 1950) ==
During this period British, Dutch, French, Portuguese and Danish colony administrators recruited a lot of local Tamilians and took them to their overseas colonies to work as labourers, petty administration officers, clerical and military duties.

In the 19th century, Madras Presidency (of which the Tamil Nadu region was a core part of) faced brutal famines. Great Famine of 1876–78. Tamil Nadu was both politically and economically weak. Britishers thus made use of Tamil workers for their plantations to all over the world - significantly in Malaysia, Mauritius, South Africa, Sri Lanka (distinct from the Sri Lankan Tamils) and also as far as Fiji, Guyana, Trinidad.

Some of the Tamil groups (especially Chettiyars, Pillais, Muslims) emigrated as commercial migrants. These groups then dominated the trade and finance in primarily in Myanmar, Singapore, and other places. The first Indian to own a merchant ship during the British times comes from this group.

There is also a group of people from French India colonies of Pondicherry and Karaikal which emigrated and settled in other parts of the world, significantly in France and its overseas territories (or former territories) in the Indian Ocean, such as Réunion and Seychelles, and the French Caribbean islands of Martinique and Guadeloupe. They also settled in some other possessions of the French colonial empire, such as French Indochina (current-day Vietnam and Cambodia), where Tamil-speaking migrants from British India were also present.

These Tamilians well integrated, assimilated with their adopted countries, and became part and parcel of local populations in Mauritius, South Africa, Guyana, and Fiji. Where as Indian Tamils of Sri Lanka, and Tamil Malaysians of Malaysia were evolved into distinct ethnic nationalities of their own but retaining their ancestral language and religion in their new homelands.

== Contemporary Migration (1950 - present) ==
In the second half of the 20th century, around 3.5 million Tamils emigrated from Tamil Nadu as skilled professionals, workers to various parts of India like Bangalore, Mumbai, Andaman Islands and also countries like UAE, USA, Singapore and so on. Some of them got citizenship of respective countries but still having strong family and cultural ties with Tamil Nadu, than those who migrated before 1950, who lost touch with their ancestral links in Tamil Nadu.

Bangalore city have a large Tamil population. It was built in 1537, and became split between its Kannadiga and Tamil residents in the 19th century. In 1991, 28% of Bangalore population of 4 million (i.e. 1.1 million) spoke Tamil. but dropped to 14% (1.5 million) in the 2011 census. Portion of them trace their ancestry to the large number of Tamil speaking soldiers, suppliers and workers who were brought into the Bangalore Civil and Military Station, by the British Army, after the fall of Tippu Sultan.

Andaman and Nicobar Islands has about 100,000 Tamils. The Tamil speaking people of the Andaman and Nicobar islands are commonly known as the Madrasi (after Madras, erstwhile name of Tamil Nadu). Andaman Tamils, like Bangalore Tamils having a strong ties with Mainland Tamils of Tamil Nadu through marriages, cultural, religious and linguistic ties.

Singapore is home to about 600,000 Tamils, among them 410,000 are recent migrants from Tamil Nadu as of 2015. The recent immigrants were distinct from Tamil-speaking native Singaporeans. Singapore has emerged as the most preferred destination among migrants from Tamil Nadu. A study in 2015 revealed that 410,000 of the 2.2 million Tamil diaspora were residing in Singapore. Early Tamil people of Singapore migrated from Tamil Nadu from as early as the 1820s. Recent decades thousands of Tamil people from Tamil Nadu migrating to Singapore for job prospects. Tamil Language is one of the four official languages in Singapore. Singapore has dedicated Tamil Newspaper, Television and Radio station funded by Government of Singapore to promote Tamil language.

In the United States, there are 300,000 Tamils emigrated from Tamil Nadu living, among them 132,000 were Citizens(2010 US Census) Central New Jersey contains the largest population concentration of Indian Americans of Tamil descent. New Jersey houses Tamil associations including its own Tamil Sangam. Sizeable Tamil populations and various Tamil organisations have also developed in the New York City Metropolitan Area and the Washington Metropolitan Area, as well as on the West Coast in the Silicon Valley, where there are Tamil associations such as the Bay Area Tamil Manram.

The Middle East is home to over 1 million emigrants from Tamil Nadu, and over 75.000 migrants immigrated to the Middle East in 2012 alone. However, statistics on the numbers of migrants are scarce.

There are about 450,000 Tamilians in the United Arab Emirates having come from Tamil Nadu as professionals and workers in many sectors. Pongal and New Year are celebrated on a grand scale in Dubai and in a few other states. The first Tamil newspaper from the Middle East region was launched from Dubai on December 10, 2014. Tamil 89.4 FM radio is a Tamil radio broadcasting from Dubai UAE.

Australia becoming favorite destination for people from Tamil Nadu to migrate. In 2011–12, India became the largest source of permanent migration to Australia forming 15.7% of the total migration programme. According to the 2011 census there were 50,151 Australians, who spoke Tamil at home.
