= Shituf =

Concept in Judaism

Shituf (Hebrew: שִׁתּוּף; also transliterated as shittuf or schituf; literally "association") is a term used in Jewish sources for the worship of God in a manner which Judaism does not deem to be purely monotheistic. The term connotes a theology that is not outright polytheistic, but also should not be seen as purely monotheistic. The term is primarily used in reference to the Christian Trinity by Jewish legal authorities who wish to distinguish Christianity from full-blown polytheism. Though a Jew would be forbidden from maintaining a shituf theology, non-Jews would, in some form, be permitted such a theology without being regarded as idolaters by Jews. That said, whether Christianity is shituf or formal polytheism remains a debate in Jewish philosophy.

Shituf is first mentioned in the commentary of Tosafot on the Babylonian Talmud, in a passage concluding with a lenient ruling regarding non-Jews. Later authorities are divided between those who view Tosfot as permitting non-Jews to swear by the name of God even if they associate other deities with that name, and those who view Tosfot as permitting non-Jews to actually worship such deities. Though shituf is primarily used as a means of determining how to relate to Christians, it is applied to other religions as well. It is frequently used as a reason to justify interfaith dialogue with Christians.

== Judaism's views of the Trinity doctrine ==
In all branches of Judaism, the God of the Hebrew Bible is considered one absolute, singular entity, defined as no other deity beside Yahweh himself, without any divisions or plurality within (while some Kabbalistic sources speak of distinct "emanations" of God, these are seen as different windows through which Jews perceive a singular God). In general, Jews reject any conception of a coequal, multi-person godhead; anything but an absolute monotheism is contrary to the Shema. Citing examples for "echad" in the Hebrew Bible as being either just one king, one house, one garden, one army, or one man, etc. Also, they reject the notion that somehow there are "traces of the Trinity" in the Hebrew word elohim. Jewish polemics against the Trinity date almost from its very conception. Even in the Talmud, Simlai (3rd century) declared, in refutation of the "heretics," "The three words 'El,' 'Elohim,' and 'YHWH' (Josh. xxii. 22) connote one and the same person, as one might say, 'King, Emperor, Augustus'" (Yer. Ber. ix. 12d). This view is espoused by Judaism's most revered credo, the Shema.

One of the best-known statements of Rabbinical Judaism on monotheism occurs in Maimonides' 13 principles of faith, Second Principle:

God, the Cause of all, is one. This does not mean one as in one of a pair, nor one like a species (which encompasses many individuals), nor one as in an object that is made up of many elements, nor as a single simple object that is infinitely divisible. Rather, God is a unity unlike any other possible unity. This is referred to in the Torah (Deuteronomy 6:4): "Hear Israel, the Lord is our God, the Lord is one."

== Medieval Jewish views ==
Jewish views, as codified in Jewish law, are split between those who see Christianity as outright idolatry and those who see Christianity as shituf. While Christians view their worship of a trinity as monotheistic, Judaism generally rejects this view.

The Talmud warns against causing an idolater to take oaths. The commentators living in Christian Germany in the 12th century, called Tosafists, permitted Jews to bring a Christian partner to court in partnership during a breakup even though the Christian would take an oath by God, which to Christians would include Jesus, by saying that so long as another deity is not mentioned explicitly, there is no forbidden oath taking place, but only an association. Although all of the Tosafists agreed that partnerships that may lead to such an oath may not be entered into originally, they disagree as to once such a partnership exists whether or not one may go to court in order not to lose his portion of the partnership and even though such an oath is a side-effect. In a terse comment, they wrote:

It is permissible to [cause a gentile's oath through litigation with one's non-Jewish partner because] today all swear in the name of the saints to whom no divinity is ascribed. Even though they also mention God's name and have in mind another thing, in any event no idolatrous name is actually said, and they also have the Creator of the world in mind. Even though they associate (shituf) God's name with "something else", we do not find that it is forbidden to cause others to associate (shituf), and there is no issue of placing a stumbling block before the blind (see Leviticus 19:14) [by entering into litigation with the non-Jewish business partner, thereby causing him to take an oath] because Noachides were not warned about it.

In the 16th century, the terse comment is explained as follows by Moses Isserles, where it is seemingly expanded to allowing partnerships in the first place:

Today, it is permitted [to form a partnership with Christians], because when they swear on their holy scriptures called the Evangelion, they do not hold it to be divine. Even though when they mention God they mean Jesus, they do not mention idolatry since they really mean the Creator of heaven and earth. Even though they mention jointly (shituf) God's name and another name, there is no prohibition to cause someone to jointly mention [or associate] (shituf) God with another... since this association is not forbidden to gentiles.

== 18th-century views ==
Moses Mendelssohn, the 18th century Jewish Enlightenment thinker, used the concept of shituf as cited in Tosafot to justify any form of association of God with another entity.

[However,] the nations of the world though they recognize the entity of God ... they nevertheless worship another entity besides Him. A few worship the angels above believing that God apportioned to each one of them a nation or country ... to rule, and they have the power to do good or bad as they please.

And these are called "other gods" in the Torah.... And a few [of the nations of the world] worship the stars in the sky ... or people ... and bow down to them, as is known. And the judgment of the intellect does not require to forbid such worship to a Son of Noah if he does not intend to remove himself from the realm of God because by what [obligation] must he offer service and prayer to God alone? And if he hopes for good and fears bad from an entity besides Him and acknowledges that also that entity is subject to God, it is not beyond the intellect for him to offer sacrifices, incense, and libation and to pray to this entity be it an angel, demon, or person.... And who would say to us [Jews] that such offerings are appropriate for God only had He not warned us against [offering to other gods] in His Torah.

== Modern views ==
Some contemporary Orthodox commentators have stated the allowance for shituf extends only to belief in multiple or complex deity, but not to worship of such a thing:

One contemporary view of Shituf holds that in Judaism, there is allowance for Gentile belief that there are other gods besides the Creator, but forbidding actual worship of them:

So long as ascribing power to a deity other than the Creator remains conceptual, it is permissible to the Children of Noah, according to many authorities. But worship of this independent being is clearly idolatry.

However, other 20th-century explanations differ. Rabbi Avrohom Yeshaya Karelitz (the Chazon Ish) wrote that Jewish law considers Christianity to be idolatry, and that the entire concept of shituf in Jewish law was only an ad hoc permission applying solely to oaths in court.

This position was explained by Orthodox historian of halakha, Rabbi David Berger, as follows:

Even medieval Jews understood very well that Christianity is avodah zarah of a special type. The tosafists assert that, although a Christian pronouncing the name of Jesus in an oath would be taking the name of "another god", it is nonetheless the case that, when Christians say the word "God", they have in mind the creator of heaven and earth. Some later authorities took the continuation of that Tosafot to mean that this special type of avodah zarah is forbidden to Jews, but permissible to gentiles, so that a non-Jew who engages in Christian worship commits no sin.

Still other Orthodox historians have stated that shituf may not be forbidden to non-Jews, but present this more softly. Rabbi Walter Wurzburger wrote:

With all our appreciation of Christianity as an avenue to God available to the non-Jewish world, we must not gloss over the fact that the Trinitarian faith still falls short of our universal religious ideals. While the belief in the Trinity – classified by the Halakhah as Shituph – may not be regarded as downright prohibited to the non-Jew, we still cannot recommend it as the ideal way in which the non-Jew should relate himself to God."

Conservative Rabbi Louis Jacobs took a more conciliatory approach:

Christian thinkers frequently assert that Jewish polemics against trinitarianism are based on an inadequate understanding of what the doctrine really means. It is no doubt true that crude attacks on Christianity as tritheism are unfounded (tritheism is, in fact, heresy from the Christian point of view), and there are subtleties in the doctrine which Christians have tried to uncover. But the fact remains that all Jewish thinkers have rejected trinitarianism as Judaism understands it.

== See also ==
- Arianism
- Idolatry in Judaism
- Shirk, a similar concept in Islam
- Tritheism
