= Andamanese peoples =

People of Andaman archipelago

Andamanese
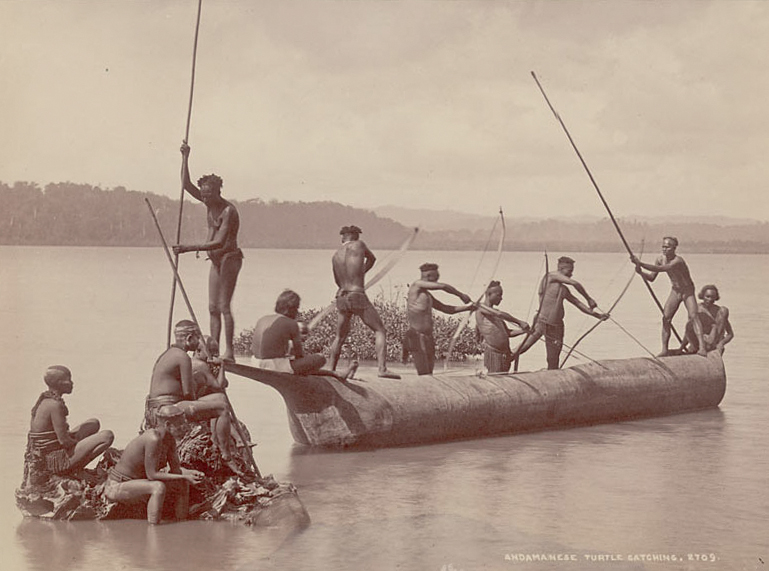
- Group of Andamanese in c. 1903 or earlier

Total population
- 555–840

Regions with significant populations
- India; Andaman Islands

Languages
- Great Andamanese languages Ongan languages (Onge, Jarawa); Sentinelese (Note: Because of their complete isolation, nearly nothing is known about the Sentinelese language, which is therefore unclassified. It has been recorded that the Jarawa language is mutually unintelligible with the Sentinelese language. There is uncertainty as to the range of overlap with the Onge language, if any. The Anthropological Survey of India's 2016 handbook on Vulnerable Tribe Groups considers them mutually unintelligible.); Hindi (as second language by some)

Religion
- Andamanese animism

Related ethnic groups
- other Negritos

The Andamanese are the various indigenous peoples of the Andaman Islands, part of India's Andaman and Nicobar Islands, the union territory in the southeastern part of the Bay of Bengal. The Andamanese are a designated Scheduled Tribe in India's constitution.

The Andamanese people are among the various groups considered Negrito, owing to their dark skin and diminutive stature. All Andamanese traditionally lived a hunter-gatherer lifestyle, and appear to have lived in substantial isolation for thousands of years. It is suggested that the Andamanese settled in the Andaman Islands around the latest glacial maximum, around 26,000 years ago.

The Andamanese people included the Great Andamanese and Jarawas of the Great Andaman archipelago, the Onge of Little Andaman, and the Sentinelese of North Sentinel Island. Among the Andamanese, a division of two groups can be made. One is more open to contact with civilization and the other is hostile and resistant to communicate with the outer world.

At the end of the 18th century, when they first came into sustained contact with outsiders, an estimated 7,000 Andamanese remained. In the next century, they experienced a massive population decline due to epidemics of outside diseases and loss of territory. Today, only roughly over 500 Andamanese remain, with the Jangil being extinct. Only the Jarawa and the Sentinelese maintain a steadfast independence, refusing most attempts at contact by outsiders.

== History ==
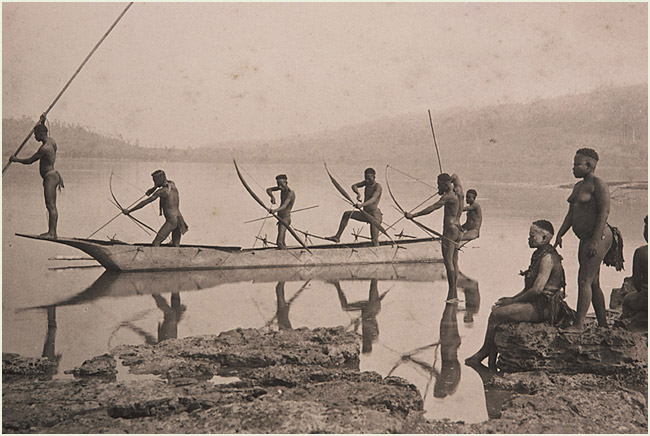
Members of an unspecified Andamanese tribe fishing in c. 1870

Until the late 18th century, the Andamanese culture, language, and genetics were preserved from outside influences by their fierce reaction to visitors, which included killing any shipwrecked foreigners, and by the remoteness of the islands. The various tribes and their mutually unintelligible languages thus are believed to have evolved on their own over millennia.

Venetian explorer Marco Polo wrote of the Andamanese in 1294, in The Travels of Marco Polo:

The people are without a king and are Idolaters, and no better than wild beasts. And I assure you all the men of this Island of Angamanain have heads like dogs, and teeth and eyes likewise; in fact, in the face they are all just like big mastiff dogs! They have a quantity of spices; but they are a most cruel generation, and eat everybody that they can catch, if not of their own race. They live on flesh and rice and milk, and have fruits different from any of ours.

=== Origins ===
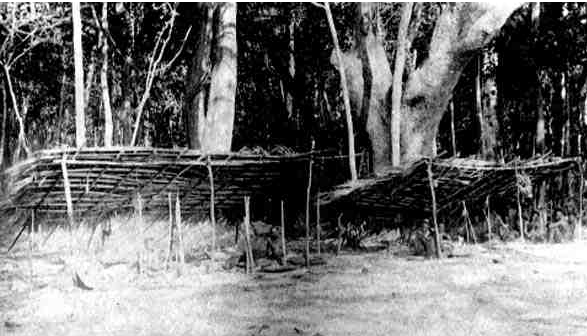
Huts of Jangil tribe, taken by Maurice Vidal Portman, 1890s

The oldest archaeological evidence for the habitation of the islands dates to the 1st millennium BC. Genetic evidence suggests that the indigenous Andamanese peoples share a common origin, and that the islands were settled sometime after 26,000 years ago, possibly at the end of the Last Glacial Period, when sea levels were much lower reducing the distance between the Andaman Islands and the Asian mainland, with genetic estimates suggesting that the two main linguistic groups (Great Andamanese and Onge/Jarawa) diverged around 16,000 years ago.

It was previously assumed that the Andaman ancestors were part of the initial Great Coastal Migration (South-Eurasians or Australasians) that was the first expansion of humanity out of Africa, via the Arabian peninsula, along the coastal regions of the South Asia towards Insular Southeast Asia, and Oceania. The Andamanese were considered to be a pristine example of a hypothesized Negrito population, which showed similar physical characteristics, and was supposed to have existed throughout southeast Asia. The existence of a specific Negrito-population is nowadays doubted. Their commonalities could be the result of evolutionary convergence and/or a shared history. Recent genetic studies conclusively demonstrate Negrito groups do not share a common origin to the exclusion of other Asians.

=== Colonial era ===
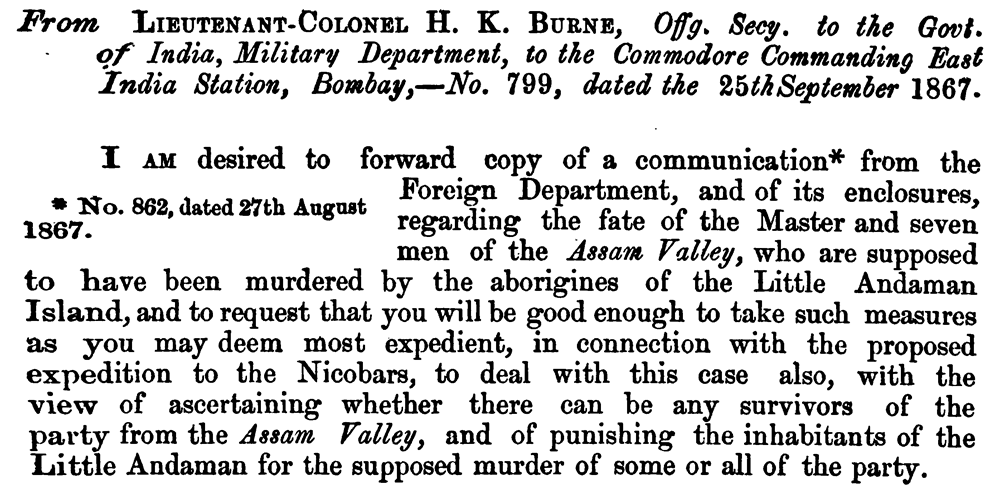
An official 1867 British government communication requesting the formation of an expeditionary party to search for shipwrecked sailors from the merchantman Assam Valley

The Andamanese's protective isolation changed with the establishment of a British colonial presence on the islands. Lacking immunity against common infectious diseases of the Eurasian mainland, the large Jarawa habitats on the southeastern regions of South Andaman Island experienced a massive population decline due to disease within four years of the establishment of a colonial presence on the island in 1789. Epidemics of pneumonia, measles and influenza spread rapidly and exacted heavy tolls, as did alcoholism. In the 19th century, a measles epidemic killed 50% of the Andamanese population. By 1875, the Andamanese were already "perilously close to extinction". In 1888, the British government set in place a policy of "organized gift giving" that continued in varying forms until the islands, as part of the British Raj, gained independence from the British Empire.

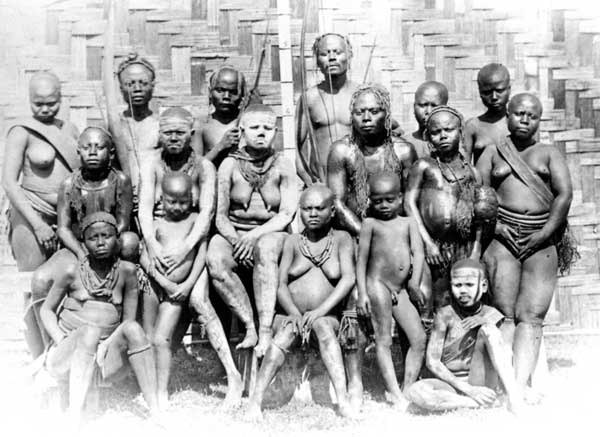
Great Andamanese men, women and children, 1876

Tensions between the colonial administration and the Andamanese increased due to British officials introducing alcohol and opium to the Andamanese. During mid-19th century, the British government in India established penal colonies on the islands and an increasing number of Indian and Karen arrived, both as settlers and prisoners.

In 1867, the British launched the Andaman Islands expedition in order to rescue shipwrecked sailors from the Assam Valley on the Andamanese islands. The expedition was attacked by the Onge people upon their approach to the islands and were forced to withdraw. Four Victoria Crosses were awarded to members of the expedition.

In 1923, the British ornithologist and anthropologist Frank Finn, who visited the islands in the 1890s while working for the Indian Museum, described the Andamanese as "The World's Most Primitive People", writing:

I used to envy the pigmies their simple costume, which in the case of the ladies was a wisp and a waistband, and in that of the men, nothing at all. Their interests are looked after by an English Civil Servant, who has to see that no one sells them drink, or interferes with them in any way; but even this officer-in-charge, as he is styled, dares not go among them where he is not known, and considerable tact is required in getting an introduction to the local chief.

In the 1940s, the Jarawa were attacked by imperial Japanese forces for their hostility. This Japanese attack was criticized as a war crime by many observers.

=== Recent history ===
In 1974, a film crew and anthropologist Triloknath Pandit attempted friendly contact by leaving a tethered pig, some pots and pans, some fruit, and toys on the beach at North Sentinel Island. One of the islanders shot the film director in the thigh with an arrow. The following year, European visitors were repulsed with arrows.

On 2 August 1981, the Hong Kong freighter ship Primrose grounded on the North Sentinel Island reef. A few days later, crewmen on the immobile vessel observed that small black men were carrying spears and arrows and building boats on the beach. The captain of the Primrose radioed for an urgent airdrop of firearms so the crew could defend themselves, but did not receive them. Heavy seas kept the islanders away from the ship. After a week, the crew were rescued by an Indian navy helicopter.

On 4 January 1991, Triloknath Pandit made the first known friendly contact with the Sentinelese.

Until 1996, the Jarawa met most visitors with flying arrows. From time to time, they attacked and killed poachers on the lands reserved to them by the Indian government. They also killed some workers building the Andaman Trunk Road (ATR), which traverses Jarawa lands. One of the earliest peaceful contacts with the Jarawa occurred in 1996. Settlers found a teenaged Jarawa boy named Enmei near Kadamtala town. The boy was immobilized with a broken foot. They took Enmei to a hospital, where he received good care. Over several weeks, Enmei learned a few words of Hindi before returning to his jungle home. The following year, Jarawa individuals and small groups began appearing along roadsides and occasionally venturing into settlements to steal food. The ATR may have interfered with traditional Jarawa food sources.

On 17 November 2018, a United States missionary, John Allen Chau, was killed when he tried to introduce Christianity to the Sentinelese tribe. The Sentinelese have been protected from contact with the outside world. Trips to the Island are prohibited by Indian law. Chau was brought near the island by local fishermen, who were later arrested during the investigation into his death. Indian authorities attempted to retrieve Chau's remains without success.

== Tribes ==
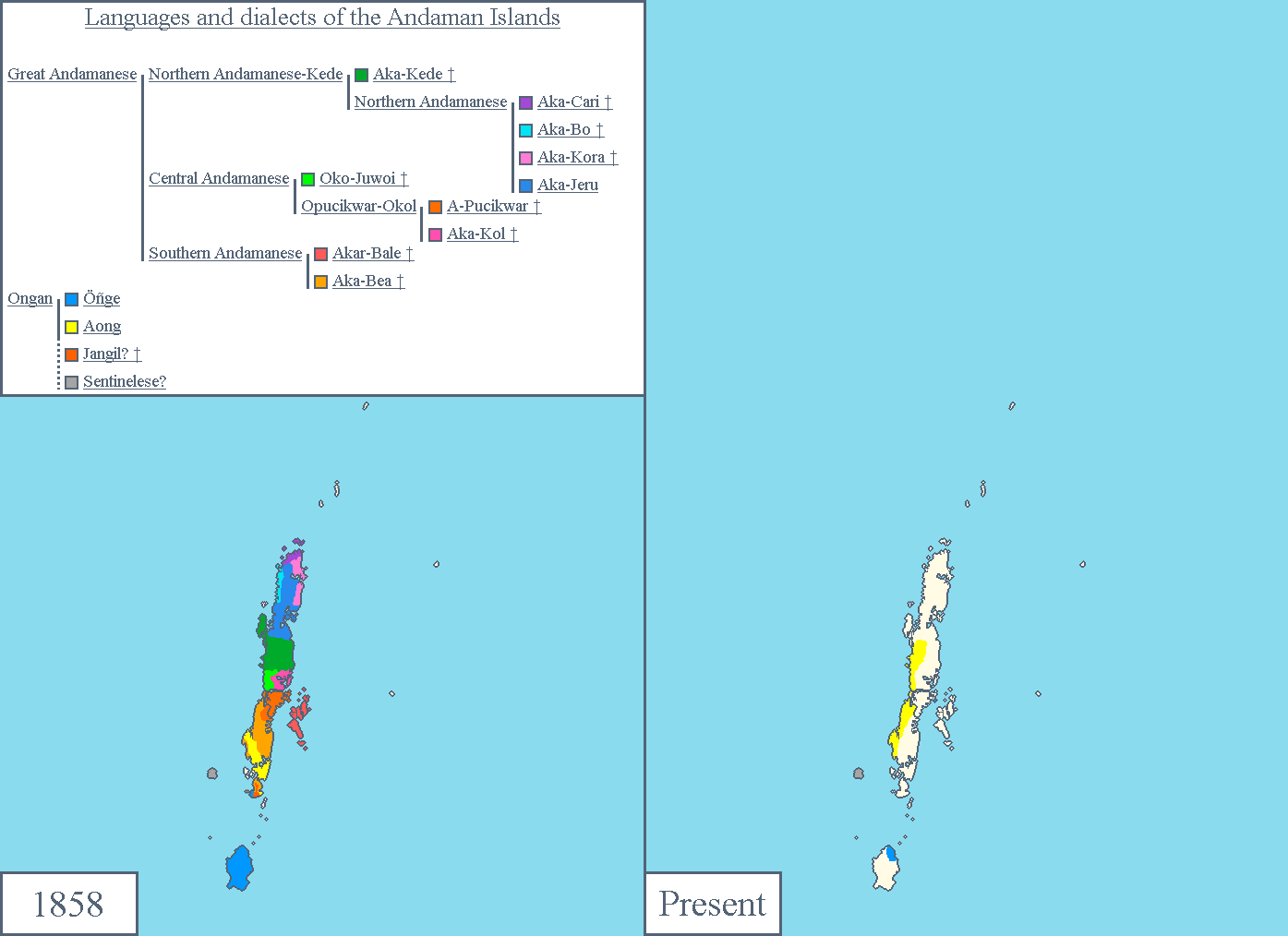
The distributions of different Andamanese peoples, languages, and dialects at the time of British contact compared to the present day

The four major groups of Andamanese are:

- Jarawa (Aong): 380 individuals as of the 2011 Indian census. They live in the ex-Great Andamanese homeland on the west coast and central parts of South and Middle Andaman Islands. (Note: They originally lived in the southern part of South Andaman Island in the Great Andaman archipelago.)
- Onge: 101 individuals as of the 2011 Indian census. They live on Little Andaman.
- Great Andamanese: 59 individuals in August 2020. The tribal and linguistic distinctions have largely disappeared, and many were forced to learn Hindi. According to a 1995 report, all of the 37 persons identifying as Great Andamanese were of mixed Andamanese, Burmese and Indian ancestry. They now primarily live only on Strait Island. (Note: They originally lived in the Great Andaman archipelago.)
- Sentinelese: estimated to be 15 individuals in the 2011 Indian census, although there have been estimates as high as 300. They live on North Sentinel Island.

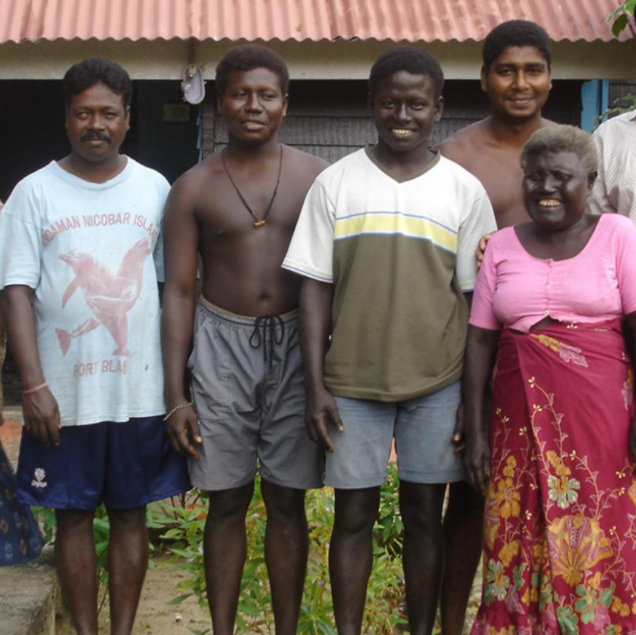
An Andamanese family on the Great Andaman island in 2006, including Boa Sr (right)

By the end of the eighteenth century, there were an estimated 5,000 Great Andamanese living on Great Andaman. Altogether they comprised ten distinct tribes with different languages. The population quickly dwindled to 600 in 1901 and to 19 by 1961. It has increased slowly after that, following their move to a reservation on Strait Island. As of 2010, the population was 52, representing a mix of the former tribes.

The Jarawa originally inhabited southeastern Jarawa Island and have migrated to the west coast of Great Andaman in the wake of the Great Andamanese. The Onge once lived throughout Little Andaman and now are confined to two reservations on the island. The Jangil, who originally inhabited Rutland Island, were extinct by 1931; the last individual was sighted in 1907. Only the Sentinelese are still living in their original homeland on North Sentinel Island, largely undisturbed, and have fiercely resisted all attempts at contact.

== Languages ==
The Andamanese languages are considered to be the fifth language family of India, following the Indo-European, Dravidian, Austroasiatic, and Sino-Tibetan.

While some connections have been tentatively proposed with other language families, such as Austronesian, or the controversial Indo-Pacific family, the consensus view is currently that Andamanese languages form a separate language family – or rather, two unrelated linguistic families: Greater Andamanese and Ongan.

== Culture ==
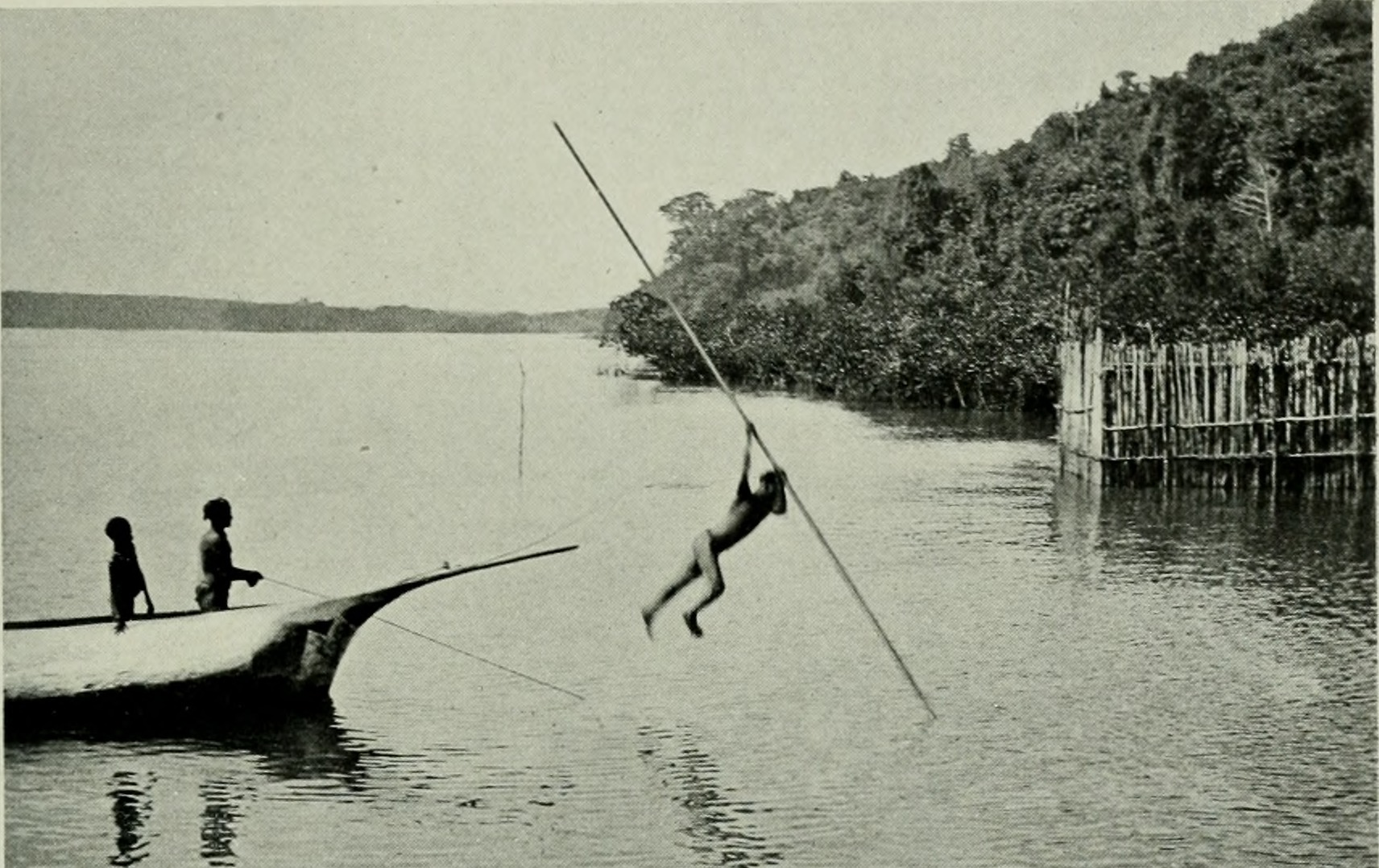
Group of Andamanese hunting, early 20th century

Until contact, the Andamanese were strict hunter-gatherers. They did not practice cultivation, and lived off hunting indigenous pigs, fishing, and gathering. Their only weapons were the bow, adzes, and wooden harpoons. The Andamanese knew of no method for making fire in the nineteenth century. They instead carefully preserved embers in hollowed-out trees from fires caused by lightning strikes.

The men wore girdles made of hibiscus fiber which carried useful tools and weapons for when they went hunting. The women on the other hand wore a tribal dress containing leaves that were held by a belt. A majority of them had painted bodies as well. They usually slept on leaves or mats and had either permanent or temporary habitation among the tribes. All habitations were human-made.

Some of the tribe members were credited with having supernatural powers. They were called oko-pai-ad, which meant dreamer. They were thought to have an influence on the members of the tribe and would bring misfortune to those who did not believe in their abilities. Traditional knowledge practitioners were the ones who helped with healthcare. The medicine that was used to cure illnesses were herbal most of the time. Various types of medicinal plants were used by the islanders. 77 total traditional knowledge practitioners were identified and 132 medicinal plants were used. The members of the tribes found various ways to use leaves in their everyday lives including clothing, medicine, and to sleep on.

Anthropologist A.R. Radcliffe Brown argued that the Andamanese had no government and made decisions by group consensus.

=== Religion ===
The native Andamanese religion and belief system is a form of animism. Ancestor worship is an important element in the religious traditions of the Andaman islands. Andamanese Mythology held that humans emerged from split bamboo, whereas the women were fashioned from clay. One version found by Alfred Reginald Radcliffe-Brown held that the first man died and went to heaven, a pleasurable world, but this blissful period ended due to breaking a food taboo, specifically eating the forbidden vegetables in the Puluga's garden. Thus Catastrophe ensued, and eventually the people grew overpopulated and didn't follow Puluga's laws, and hence there was a Great Flood that left four survivors, who lost their fire.

== Physical appearance ==
=== Phenotype ===
Both male and female Andamanese average below 5 feet tall, with very dark skin. Their hair is described as "peppercorn", growing in curled tufts with skin visible in between; this trait is shared with the Khoi people of Southern Africa. Similarly to other Negrito groups, the face is typically broad, with prominent cheek bones and a straight, broad nose. Andamanese women sometimes have steatopygia, where substantial levels of fat accumulate in the buttocks.

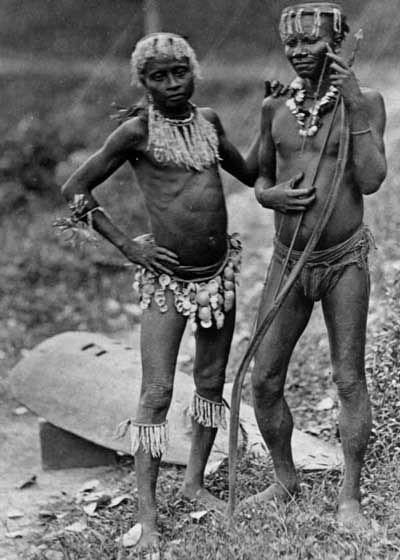
Two Great Andamanese men in 1875

=== Dental morphology ===
Dental characteristics also group the Andamanese between Negrito and East-Asian samples.

When comparing dental morphology the focus is on overall size and tooth shape. To measure the size and shape, Penrose's size and shape statistic is used. To calculate tooth size, the sum of the tooth area is taken. Factor analysis is applied to tooth size to achieve tooth shape. Results have shown that the dental morphology of Andaman Islanders resembles that of tribal populations of South Asia (Adivasi) the most, followed by Philippine Negrito groups, contemporary Southeast Asians, and East Asians. The tooth size of the Andamanese was found to be most similar to that of Han Chinese and Yamato Japanese.

== Genetics ==
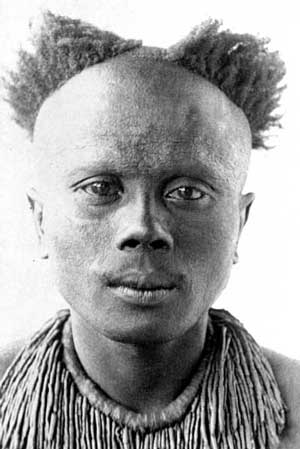
Riala, an interpreter for the British from the Aka-Kede tribe of Great Andamanese from Middle Andaman, in 1890

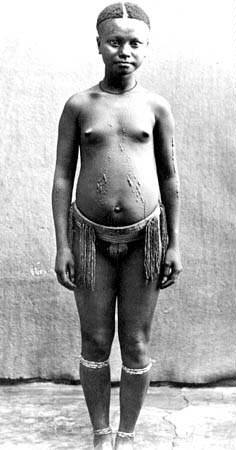
"Scarification pattern among the Great Andamanese in the late 19th century. Nothing is known of the origins or antiquity of this custom among the Andamanese." – Edward Horace Man, 1901

Genetic analysis, both of nuclear DNA and mitochondrial DNA, provide information about the origins of the Andamanese. Genetic studies agree that Great Andamanese as well as Onge and Jawara, share a common origin and descend from a "deeply branching East Asian lineage", but are highly divergent from other Asian populations.

=== Genetic variation ===
The Andamanese show a very small genetic variation, which is indicative of populations that have experienced a population bottleneck and then developed in isolation for a long period.

An allele has been discovered among the Jarawas that is found nowhere else in the world. Blood samples of 116 Jarawas were collected and tested for Duffy blood group and malarial parasite infectivity. Results showed a total absence of both Fya and Fyb antigens in two areas (Kadamtala and R.K Nallah) and low prevalence of both Fya antigen in another two areas (Jirkatang and Tirur). There was an absence of malarial parasite Plasmodium vivax infection though Plasmodium falciparum infection was present in 27·59% of cases. A very high frequency of Fy (a–b–) in the Jarawa tribe from all the four jungle areas of Andaman Islands along with total absence of P. vivax infections suggests the selective advantage offered to Fy (a–b–) individuals against P. vivax infection.

=== External genetic affinity ===
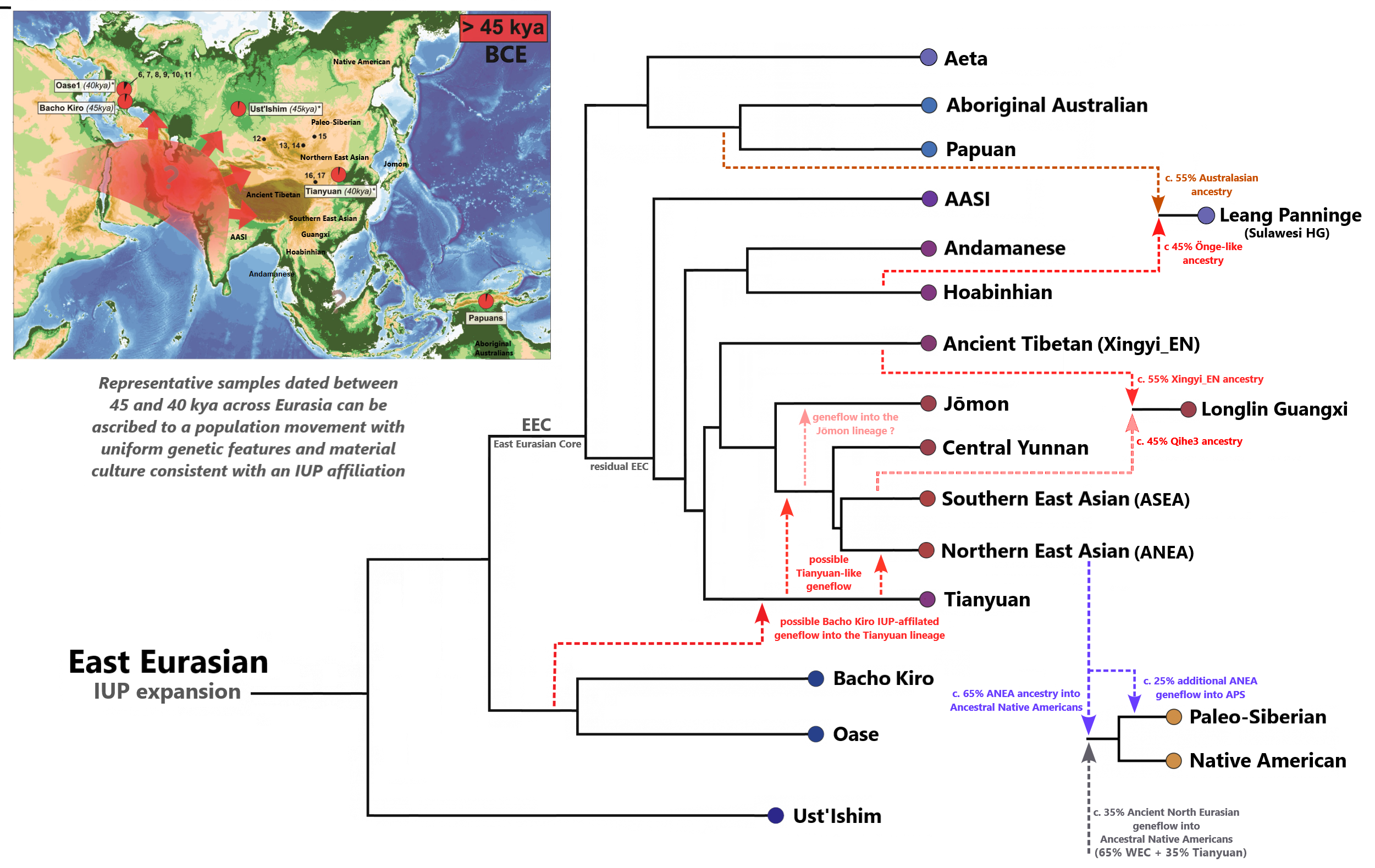
Phylogenetic position of the Andamanese lineage among other East Eurasians

Genetic studies have revealed that the Andamanese people display affinity to the indigenous South Asian hunter-gatherers, often termed "Ancient Ancestral South Indians" (AASI), as well as to Australasian populations (AA), such as Melanesians, and contemporary East and Southeast Asian peoples (ESEA). While the Andamanese are occasionally used as an imperfect proxy for the AASI component, they are genetically closer to the 'Basal East Asian' Tianyuan man. Concerning the use of Andamanese as proxy for AASI ancestry, Yelmen et al. (2019) deduced that the non West Eurasian component, termed S-component, extracted from South Asian samples would serve as a much better proxy for AASI ancestry, especially those extracted from Irula samples, than the Andamanese.

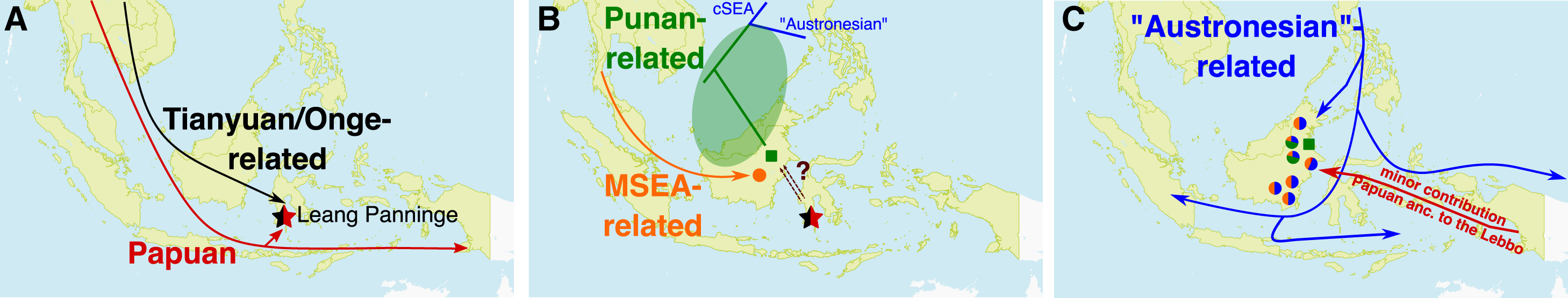
Schematic summary of population settlement in Insular Southeast Asia, involving several East Eurasian lineages: (A) Initial occupation of Sunda and Sahul by ancestry related to modern New Guinean and Australian Aboriginal populations, followed by deep mainland Asian (Tianyuan- or Onge-related) ancestry. (B) Dispersals of ancestries associated with ancient Mainland Southeast Asian and ancestral Punan-related components predating the coastal South Chinese, and hence Austronesian-related, ancestries. (C) Austronesian expansion leading to Austronesian (Ami- and Kankanaey-related) ancestry observed in NE and SE Borneans and subsequent specific Papuan ancestry admixture observed in the Lebbo population in East Borneo.

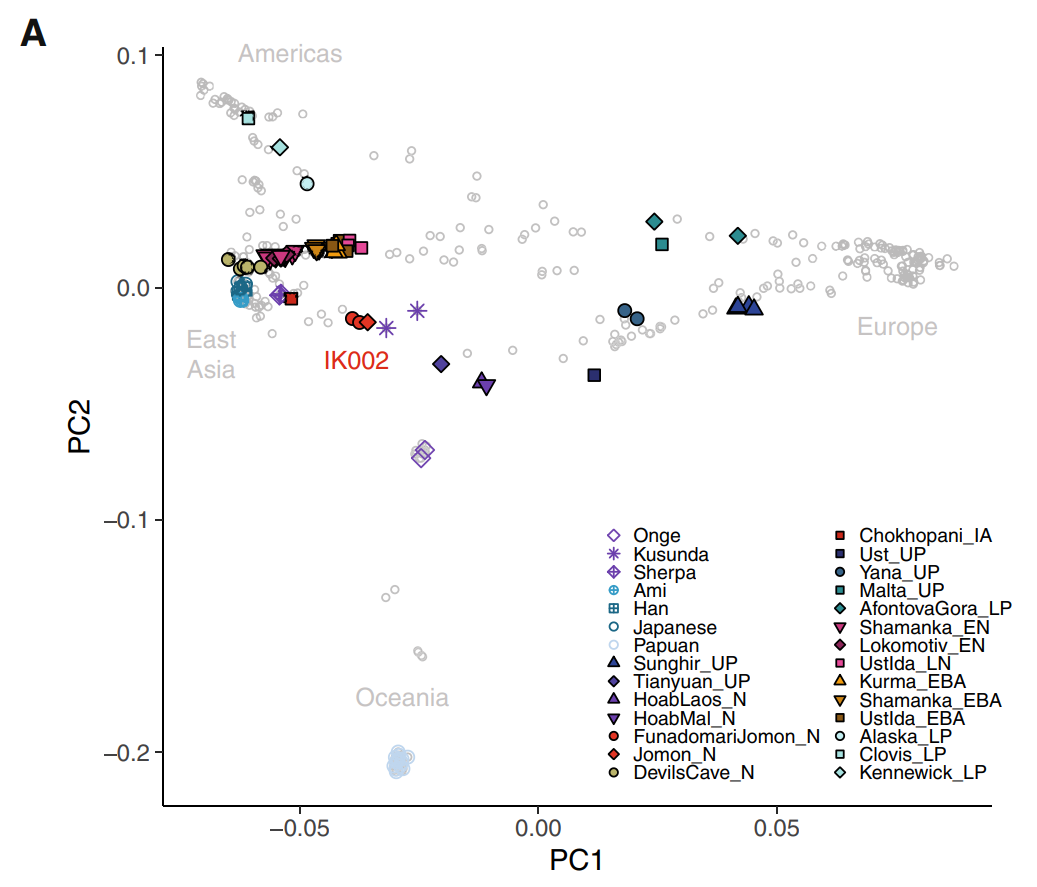
Principal component analysis of ancient and present-day individuals from Eurasian populations

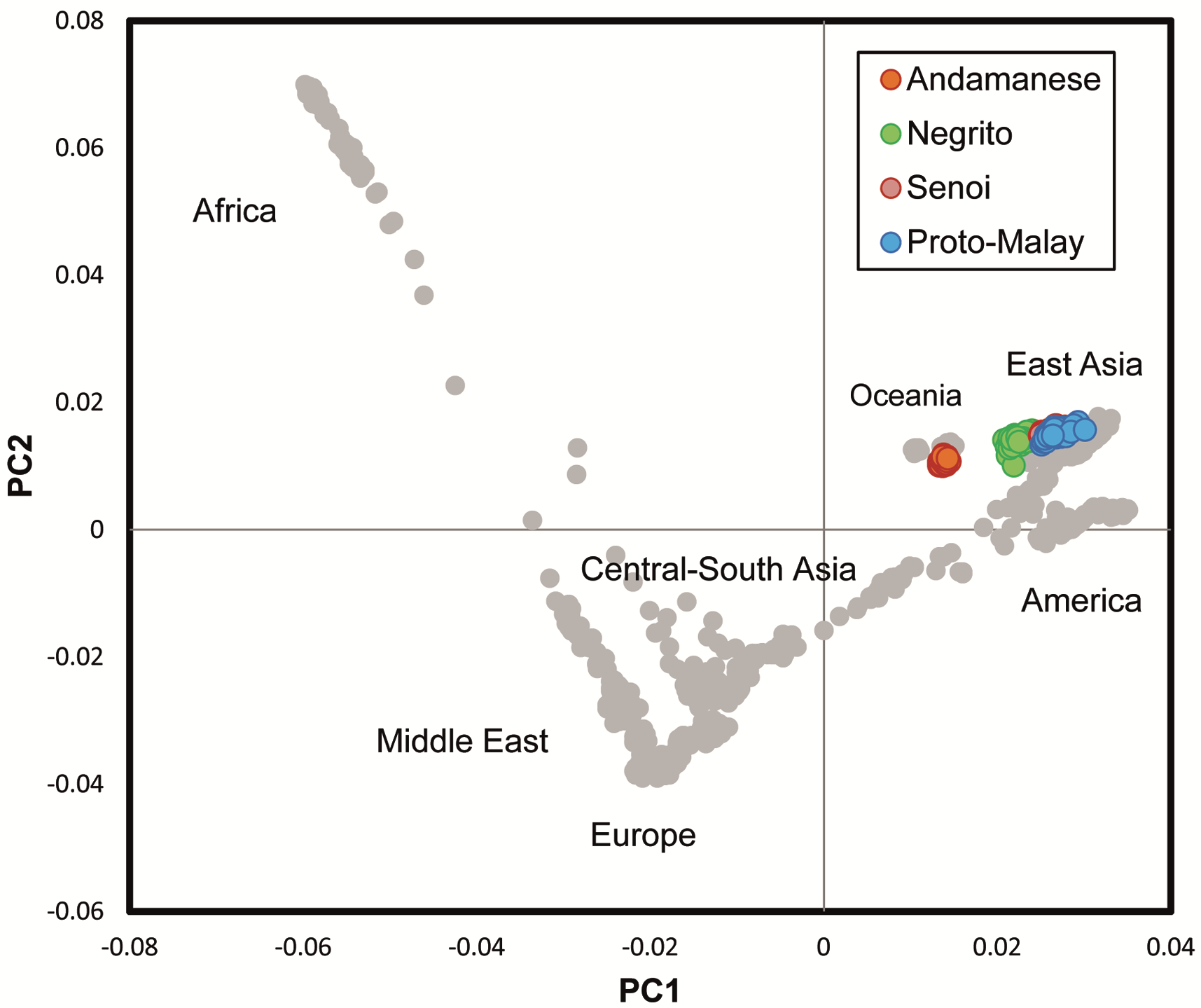
Principal component analysis of Orang Asli (Semang) and Andamanese, with worldwide populations in HGDP

Phylogenetic data suggests that an early initial eastern lineage migrated eastward from the Iranian Plateau, and trifurcated, giving rise to Australasians (Oceanians), the AASI, Andamanese, as well as East/Southeast Asians, although Papuans may have also received some geneflow from an earlier group (xOoA), around 2%. Alternatively, they might have indirectly received input from a 'super-archaic lineage' from their Denisovan ancestry. Studies have also suggested a simultaneous split between the Onge, Asian (including Han, Indigenous Taiwanese and Thai) and Near Oceanian lineages after the initial migration of anatomically modern humans beyond Africa. Other studies, however, suggest that the Andamanese briefly shared genetic drift with the ancestors of Tianyuan-related populations before diverging. Groups like Papuans were also believed to have diverged from other East Eurasians before Tianyuan-related populations. Genetic differences between them and Tianyuan-related populations were likewise attributed to archaic hominin admixture.

When compared with ancient DNA samples, Andamanese peoples are closest to the pre-Neolithic Hoabinhians in Mainland Southeast Asia (covered by two samples from Malaysia and Laos), and display high genetic affinity to the Tianyuan man in Northern China. The latter two are basal to contemporary East Asians, forming a "deep Asian" ancestral lineage. Deep Asian ancestry (Tianyuan/Onge) also contributed to the peopling of Southeast Asia. According to a 2023 study, the Great Andamanese is found to be ancestral to the Onge-Jarawa group owing to their higher diversity. The former also exhibits recent admixture with mainland Indians, Nicobarese and Shompen.

Overall, the Malaysian Negritos (Semang), such as the Maniq people, Jahai people, and Batek people, are the closest modern living relatives of the Andamanese people. However, these Negrito populations still show significant genetic differentiation from the Andamanese.

Ancient and modern East Asian people can be modeled as having Onge-like ancestry (c. 76–79%) and Tianyuan-like ancestry (21–24%). The Jōmon people of Japan derive an additional amount (38%) from a Hoabinhian-like source. Present-day Southeast Asian populations fall along a cline between East Asian and Onge-like ancestry, associated with local Hoabinhians.

=== Y-DNA ===
The male Y-chromosome in humans is inherited exclusively through paternal descent. All sampled males of Onges (23/23) and Jarawas (4/4) belong to a sublineage of D-M174 (D1a3). However, male Great Andamanese do not appear to carry these clades. A low resolution study suggests that they belong to haplogroups K, L, O and P1 (P-M45).

A 2017 study by Mondal et al. finds that the Y-chromosome of the Reang (a Tibeto-Burmese population), sublineage D1a3 (D-M174*) and the Andamanese D1a3 (*D-Y34637) have their nearest related lineages in East Asia, splitting about 23,000 years ago from an East Asian-related population. The Jarawa and Onge shared this D1a3 lineage with each other within the last ~7,000 years, suggesting a bottleneck event. They further suggest that: "This strongly suggests that haplogroup D does not indicate a separate ancestry for Andamanese populations. Rather, haplogroup D was part of the standing variation carried by the OOA expansion, and later lost from most of the populations except in Andaman and partially in Japan and Tibet". Other haplogroups found among Andamanese include haplogroup P, and L-M20.

Several studies (Hammer et al. 2006, Shinoda 2008, Matsumoto 2009, Cabrera et al. 2018) suggest that the paternal haplogroup D-M174 originated somewhere in Central Asia. According to Hammer et al., haplogroup D-M174 originated between Tibet and the Altai mountains. He suggests that there were multiple waves into Eastern Eurasia. In a 2019 study by Haber et al. showed that Haplogroup D-M174 originated in Central Asia and evolved as it migrated to different directions of the continent. One group of population migrated to Siberia, others to Japan and Tibet, and another group migrated to the Andaman islands.

=== mt-DNA ===
Bulbeck (2013) shows the Andamanese maternal mtDNA is entirely mitochondrial Haplogroup M. Haplogroup M (mtDNA) is a descendant of haplogroup L3, typically found in Eurasia and parts of Africa. The mtDNA M is found in all Onge and most of the Great Andamanese samples. Analysis of mtDNA, which is inherited exclusively by maternal descent, confirms the above results. Haplogroup M is however also the single most common mtDNA haplogroup in Asia, where it represents 60% of all maternal lineages. Haplogroup M is also relatively common in Northeast Africa of Somalis, Oromo at over 20%. Also in the Tuareg in Mali and Burkina Faso at 18.42%.

=== Archaic admixture ===
Unlike some Negrito populations of Southeast Asia, Andaman Islanders have not been found to have Denisovan ancestry. However, they are estimated, like all other non-African populations, to possess approximately 1–2% Neanderthal ancestry. A 2019 study concluded that all Asian and Australo-Papuan populations, including Andaman Islanders, share between 2.6 and 3.4% of the genetic profile of a previously unknown hominin that was genetically roughly equidistant to Denisovans and Neanderthals. Other studies state that Andaman Islanders have Denisovan ancestry but it's lower than what's found in groups like Papuans, Aboriginal Australians, Filipino Negritos etc.

== See also ==
- Adivasis
- Battle of Aberdeen (Andaman Islands)
- Andaman Tamils
- Andamanese languages
- Uncontacted peoples
- Early human migrations
- Nicobarese people
