= Andaman Tamils =

People of the Andaman and Nicobar Islands

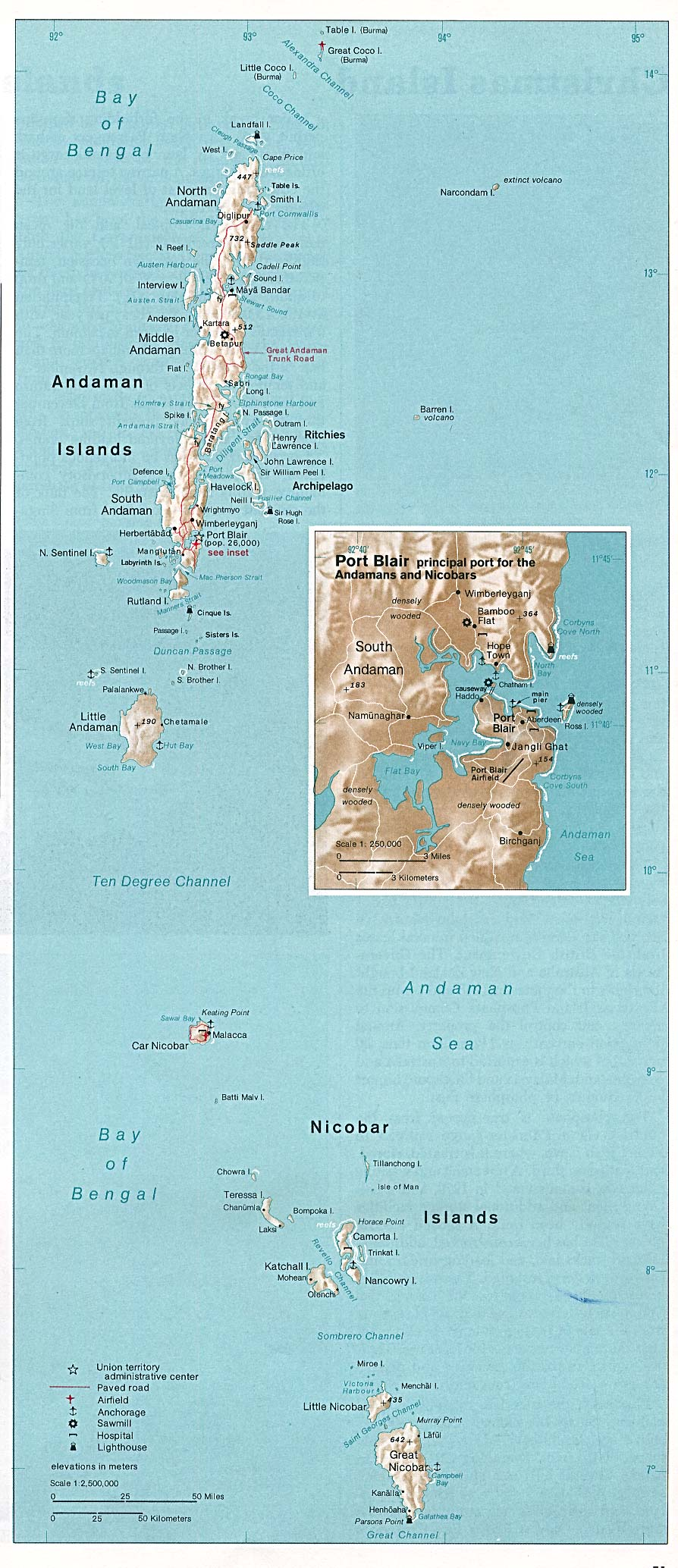
Detailed map of the Andaman and Nicobar Islands

The Andaman Tamils are Tamil-speaking people of the Andaman and Nicobar Islands, commonly known as the Madrasi (after Madras, erstwhile name of Chennai). There are three groups. The first are those who migrated from Tamil Nadu in search of livelihood and are found in almost all the islands where human beings are settled. The second are Tamil-speaking repatriates from Myanmar who migrated after the military junta came to power in the then Burma. The third group are Tamil-speaking repatriates from Sri Lanka who migrated after ethnic clashes began there. The population of the first group is largest and is still swelling as the migration continues.

Andaman Tamils speak Tamil at home and use Tamil script when writing. With non-Tamils, they speak in a sort of local Hindi, often referred to as Andaman Hindi. Educated Tamils speak in English too. Most Andaman Tamils enjoy privileges under the category of "local" residents. The Andaman and Nicobar Islands have about 100,000 Tamils.

== Chola empire ==
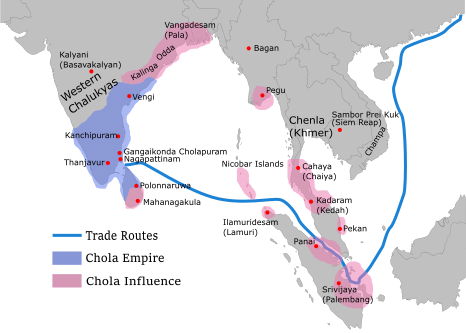
The Cholas used the islands as a naval base in 11th century CE to launch attacks in South East Asia

In the 11th century CE, Rajendra Chola I of the Chola dynasty of Tamilakam invaded parts of South East Asia using the Andaman and Nicobar Islands as an intermediate naval base. It was part of an established Chola trade route connecting India and South East Asia, with the practice continuing in the subsequent years during the reigns of Rajendra II and Kulothunga I. Chola inscriptions from Thanjavur, dated to 1050 CE, describe the islands as Ma-Nakkavaram meaning "great open/naked land" in Tamil. The islands are later mentioned by Marco Polo in the 13th century CE and Friar Oderic in early 14th century CE.

== Census ==
According to the information furnished by the Andaman and Nicobar Administration, the population of different linguistic groups recorded in the census of 1971 was as under:

- Bengali 28114
- Nicobarese 17955
- Tamil 14518
- Hindi 13982
- Malayalam 13916
- Telugu 9361
- Urdu 2588
- Punjabi 1024
- Oriya 250
- Kannada 201
- Marathi 115
- Gujarati 159
- Assamese 17
- Sindhi 7
- Kashmiri 8
- Others 12918

== See also ==
- Andamanese peoples
