= Pūluga =

God in Andaman religion

Pūluga (or Puluga) is the creator in the religion of the indigenous inhabitants of the Andaman Islands. According to Andaman mythology, Puluga ceased to visit the people when they became remiss of the commands given to them at the creation. Then, without further warning he sent a devastating flood. Only four people survived this flood: two men, Loralola and Poilola, and two women, Kalola and Rimalola. When they landed they found they had lost their fire and all living things had perished. Puluga then recreated the animals and plants but does not seem to have given any further instructions, nor did he return the fire to the survivors. Puluga created the entire riches of forests of Marakele (Andaman Islands). With the dwindled number of Andamanese tribals who now live in Strait Island, the reverence to Puluga seems to be forgotten.
