= List of islands of India =

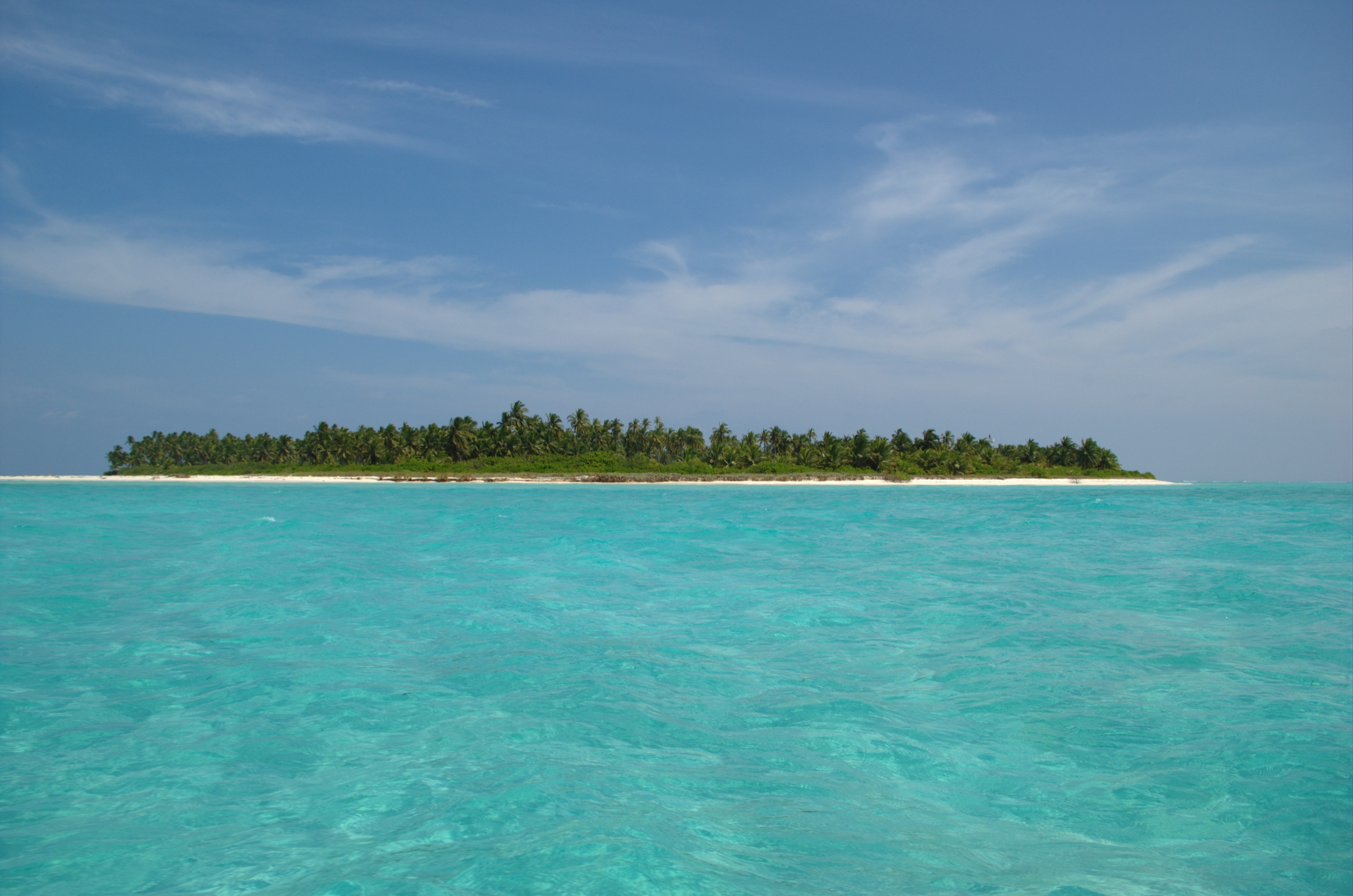
One of the islands in Lakshadweep

This is a partial list of islands in the Indian Republic. There are a total of 1,382 islands (including uninhabited ones) in the country.

== Andaman and Nicobar Islands ==
The Andaman and Nicobar Islands are a group of 572 islands of Bengal and Andaman Sea.

=== Andaman Islands ===
- Great Andaman Islands
  - North Andaman Island
    - Cleugh Passage Group
      - Landfall Island
      - East Island
      - West Island
      - Peacock (Pocock) Island
    - Table-Smith Group
      - Trilby Island
      - Smith Island
      - Delgarno Island
      - Table Island
      - Excelsior Island
      - Beach Island
      - Tatle Island
      - Temple Islands
      - Turtle Islands
    - Aerial Bay Islands
      - Smith Island
      - Ross Island
      - Brush island
      - Chatham Island
      - Ox Island
      - Wharf Island
      - North Island
    - Thornhill-Paget Group
      - Thornhill Island
      - White Cliff Island
      - Prem Usha (Jalgara or Aquaman) Island
      - Reef Island
      - Sand Bank Island
      - Paget Island
      - Point Island
      - North Reef Island
      - Latouche Island
      - Shark Island
    - Stewart Sound Group
      - Jadunath Island
      - Blister Island
      - Curlew Island
      - Stewart Island
      - Dotrel Island
      - Sound Island
      - Orchid Island
      - Karlo Island
      - Swamp Island
      - Egg Island
      - Aves Island
    - Interview Group
      - Interview Island
      - Bird Island
      - Anderson Island
      - Kartara Island
      - Helicopter Island
      - Murga Island
      - Bennett Island
      - South Reef Island
      - Tufi Island
      - Captain Karam Singh Dweep
      - Khetarpal Dweep
      - Manoj Park Island
      - Bana Dweep
      - Hoshiyar Dweep
      - Albert Ekka Island
  - Middle Andaman Island
    - Hump Island
    - Flat Island
  - Baratang Group
    - Baratang Island
    - East Baratang Group
      - Porlob Island
      - Long Island
      - Guitar Island
      - Colebrooke Island
      - North Passage Island
      - Strait Island
    - West Baratang Group
      - West Baratang Island
      - Parrot Island
      - Boning Island
      - Sutarpara Island
      - Talakaicha Island
      - Spike Island
      - Bluff Island
      - Belle Island
  - South Andaman Island
    - Napier Bay Islands
      - James Island
      - Petman Island
      - Kyd Island
      - Aksharaa island
      - Port Meadow Islands
    - Defence Islands
      - Defence Island
      - Petrie Island
      - Montgomery Island
      - Clyde Island
    - Port Blair Islands
      - Netaji Subhas Chandra Bose Island
      - Snake Island
      - Chatham Island
      - Viper Island
      - Garacharma Island
      - Flat Bay Island
      - Ranger Island
      - Pitman Island
    - Ritchie's Archipelago
      - Button Islands
        - North Button Island
        - Middle Button Island
        - South Button Island
      - Outram Island
      - Henry Lawrence Island
      - John Lawrence Island
      - Sir William Peel Island
      - Wilson Island
      - Nicholson Island
      - Swaraj Dweep
      - Shaheed Dweep
      - Rose Island
  - Rutland Archipelago
    - Rutland Island
    - Mahatma Gandhi Marine National Park (Labyrinth Islands, made up of a) Twin Islands and b) North Mahatma Gandhi Islands)
      - Alexandra Island
      - North Hobday (Dhan Singh) Island
      - Hobday Island
      - Maly Island
      - Red Skin Island
      - Pluto Island
      - Parissa Island
      - Chester Island
      - Tarmugli Island
      - Belly Island
      - Snob Island
      - Grub Island
      - Boat Island
      - Jolly Bouy Island
    - North Sentinel Island
    - Twin Islands
      - East Twin Island
      - West Twin Island
    - Cinque Islands
      - North Cinque Island
      - South Cinque Island
    - The Sisters
      - East Sister Island
      - West Sister Island
    - Passage Island
- Little Andaman Group
  - Little Andaman Island
  - South Sentinel Island
  - The Brothers Islands
    - North Brother Island
    - South Brother Island
- East Volcano Islands
  - Narcondam Island
  - Barren Island

=== Nicobar Islands ===
Northern Group:

- Car Nicobar
- Battimalv

Central Group:

- Chowra, Chaura or Sanenyo
- Teressa or Luroo
  - Bompuka or Poahat
- Katchal
- Camorta
  - Trinket
- Nancowry or Nancowrie
- Tillangchong
  - Laouk or "Isle of Man"

Southern Group (Sambelong):

- Little Nicobar
  - Pulo Milo or Pillomilo (Milo Island)
  - Meroe
  - Menchal Island (Mini Nicobar Island)
  - Trak Island
  - Treis Island
- Great Nicobar (922 km^{2} or 356 sq mi, largest island of the Nicobars)
  - Kondul Island
  - Kabra Islet
  - Pigeon Islet
  - Megapod Islet

== Andhra Pradesh ==
- Bhavani Island
- Diviseema
- Konaseema
- Hope
- Irukkam
- Sriharikota
- Venadu

== Assam ==
- Dibru Saikhowa Island
- Majuli Island
- Umananda Island

== Bihar ==
- Raghopur Diyara Island

== Dadra and Nagar Haveli and Daman and Diu ==
- Diu Island

== Goa ==
- Within Bardez sub-district:
  - Calvim
  - Corjuem
  - Raneache Zuem
- Within Canacona sub-district:
  - Anjediva Island
  - Cancona Island
- Within Tiswadi sub-district:
  - Chorão
  - Cumbarjua
  - Divar
  - St Estevam
  - Vanxim
- Within Mormugão sub-district:
  - Ilha de Grande
  - Ilha de Pequeño
  - São Jacinto
  - Ilha de São Jorge

== Gujarat ==
- Bet Dwarka
- Gangto Bet Island
- Islands of the Gulf of Kutch
- Islands of Eastern Indus Delta
- Kutch Island
- Nanda Bet Island
- Piram Island
- Pirotan Island
- Shiyalbet Island

== Jammu and Kashmir ==
- Char Chinar (Ropa Lank)
- Zainul Lank

== Karnataka ==
- St. Mary's Islands
- Basavaraj Durga Island
- Kurumgad Island
- Netrani Island
- Nisargadhama
- Pavoor Uliya
- Srirangapatna
- Uppinakudru

== Kerala ==
- Kochi Islands
  - Willingdon Island
    - Venduruthy
  - Vypin
    - Nedungad
    - Gundu Island
  - Mulavukad
  - Vallarpadam
    - Ramanthuruth
  - Thanthonnithuruth
  - Moolampilly Island
  - Pizhala
  - Kothad
  - Kumbalam
  - Panangad
  - Cheppanam
  - Kumbalangi
  - Kunjunnikkara
  - Sathar Island
- Chavara Thekkumbhagom
- Dharmadam Island
- Edayilakkad
- Ezhumanthuruthu
- Kavvayi Islands
- Kuruvadweep
- Munroe Island
- Parumala
- Pathiramanal
- Perumbalam
- Poochakkal
- Pulinkunnoo

== Lakshadweep islands ==
Lakshadweep is an archipelago of twelve atolls, three reefs and five submerged banks, with a total of about 39 islands and islets.

=== Aminidivi Islands ===
- Amini Island
- Bitrā Island
- Byramgore
- Chetlat Island
- Cherbaniani
- Kadmat Island
- Kiltān Island
- Perumal Par

=== Laccadive Islands ===
- Agatti Island
- Bangaram Island
- Kavaratti Island
- Pitti Island
- Suheli Par
- Kalpatti Island
- Androth Island
- Kalpeni Island
- Pitti Island (Kalpeni)

=== Minicoy Island ===
- Minicoy Island
- Viringili Island

== Maharashtra ==
- Ambu Island
- Butcher Island
- Cross Island
- Elephanta Island
- Gowalkot
- Hog Island
- Khanderi Island
- Madh Island
- Marve Island
- Middle Ground Isle
- Murud-Janjira
- Oyster Rock
- Panju Island
- Salsette Island
- Sinoy Hill Island
- Suvarnadurg Island
- Underi Island
- Yeshwantgad Island
- Pankhol Juva Island

=== Seven Islands of Mumbai ===
  - Colaba Island
  - Old Woman's Island
  - Isle of Bombay
  - Mazagaon Island
  - Parel Island
  - Worli Island
  - Mahim Island

== Manipur ==
- Keibul Lamjao Island
- Floating Islands (Phumdi)

== Meghalaya ==
- Nongkhnum River Island

== Odisha ==
- Abdul Kalam Island (Wheeler Island)
- Cattle Island
- Hukitola
- Kalijai Island
- Kanika Island
- Nalbana Island
- Parikud Island

== Tamil Nadu ==
- Hare Island (Muyal Theevu)
- Krusadai Island
- Nallathanni Theevu
- Pamban Island
- Pullivasal Island
- Srirangam Island
- Upputanni Island
- Vivekananda Rock
- Quibble Island
- Kattupalli Island
- The Island, Chennai
- Vaalai Theevu, Kilakarai Tamil Nadu
- Appa Theevu, Kilakarai, Tamil Nadu
- Whale Island, Chennai
- Battle of Adyar Island, Chennai

== West Bengal ==
- Bhutni Island

=== Sundarbans ===
- Bakkhali Island
- Bhangduni (Bob) Island
- Dalhousie Island
- Ghoramara Island
- Gosaba Island
- Haliday Island
- Henry Island
- Jambudwip
- Kakdwip
- Lohachara Island
- Lothian Island
- Marichjhanpi
- Mousuni Island
- Namkhana island
- Nayachar island
- New Moore island
- Patharpratima island
- Sagar Island
- Tin Kona island

== See also ==
- Coastal India
- Mainland India
- Island South Asia
- Fishing in India
- List of islands in Lakshadweep
- List of beaches in India
