= 72nd meridian east =

Line of longitude

72nd meridian east

The meridian 72° east of Greenwich is a line of longitude that extends from the North Pole across the Arctic Ocean, Asia, the Indian Ocean, the Southern Ocean, and Antarctica to the South Pole.

The 72nd meridian east forms a great circle with the 108th meridian west.

== From Pole to Pole ==
Starting at the North Pole and heading south to the South Pole, the 72nd meridian east passes through:

Co-ordinates	Country, territory or sea	Notes
90°0′N 72°0′E	Arctic Ocean	
81°6′N 72°0′E	Kara Sea	
72°48′N 72°0′E	Russia	Yamal Peninsula, Yamalo-Nenets Autonomous Okrug
71°33′N 72°0′E	Gulf of Ob	
71°21′N 72°0′E	Russia	Yamal Peninsula, Yamalo-Nenets Autonomous Okrug
67°2′N 72°0′E	Gulf of Ob	
66°14′N 72°0′E	Russia	Yamalo-Nenetsia, Khantia-Mansia, Tyumen Oblast, Omsk Oblast
54°14′N 72°0′E	Kazakhstan	North Kazakhstan, Akmola, Karaganda, Zhambyl
42°47′N 72°0′E	Kyrgyzstan	Talas, Jalal-Abad
41°10′N 72°0′E	Uzbekistan	Namangan, Andijan, Fergana
40°20′N 72°0′E	Kyrgyzstan	Batken, Osh
39°21′N 72°0′E	Tajikistan	DCGJ, Kuhistan-Badakhshon
36°48′N 72°0′E	Afghanistan	Badakhshan Province
36°34′N 72°0′E	Pakistan	Khyber Pakhtunkhwa; Punjab
28°12′N 72°0′E	India	Rajasthan; Gujarat
21°8′N 72°0′E	Indian Ocean	Passing just east of Cherbaniani Reef, Lakshadweep, India; Passing just east of Byramgore Reef, Lakshadweep, India; Passing just west of Bitra atoll, Lakshadweep, India; Passing just west of Perumal Par atoll, Lakshadweep, India; Passing just west of Agatti Island, Lakshadweep, India; Passing just east of Peros Banhos, British Indian Ocean Territory
60°0′S 72°0′E	Southern Ocean	
68°25′S 72°0′E	Antarctica	Australian Antarctic Territory, claimed by Australia

== See also ==
- 71st meridian east
- 73rd meridian east
