= Kattupalli (disambiguation) =

Kattupalli (Tamil: காட்டுபள்ளி), is a suburb located North of Chennai, a metropolitan city in Tamil Nadu, India. It is one of the main places where the war between Pandyas and Arabs was held.

Kattupalli may also refer to:

- Kattupalli Island, is an island on the southern periphery of the Pulicat Lake
- Kattupalli Shipyard, a large shipyard project at Ennore in Chennai
- Kattupalli (Ervadi), a separate area in Ervadi dargah, Ramanathapuram district
