= Kyd Island =

- Location within Andaman and Nicobar Islands

Geography
- Location: Bay of Bengal
- Coordinates: 11.95°N 92.75°E
- Archipelago: Andaman Islands
- Adjacent to: Indian Ocean
- Total islands: 1
- Major islands: Kyd
- Area: 5.42 km^{2} (2.09 sq mi)
- Length: 3.29 km (2.044 mi)
- Width: 2.24 km (1.392 mi)
- Coastline: 10.37 km (6.444 mi)
- Highest elevation: 237 m (778 ft)

Administration
- India
- District: South Andaman
- Island group: Andaman Islands
- Island sub-group: Napier Bay Islands
- Tehsil: Ferrargunj Tehsil

Demographics
- Population: 0 (2016)
- Pop. density: 0.00/km^{2} (0/sq mi)
- Ethnic groups: Hindu, Andamanese

Additional information
- Time zone: IST (UTC+5:30)
- PIN: 744206
- Telephone code: 031927
- ISO code: IN-AN-00
- Official website: www.and.nic.in
- Literacy: 84.4%
- Avg. summer temperature: 30.2 °C (86.4 °F)
- Avg. winter temperature: 23.0 °C (73.4 °F)
- Sex ratio: 1.2♂/♀
- Census Code: 35.639.0004
- Official Languages: Hindi, English

Kyd Island is an island of the Andaman Islands. It belongs to the South Andaman administrative district, part of the Indian union territory of Andaman and Nicobar Islands. The island lies 30 km (19 mi) north from Port Blair.

== Geography ==
The island belongs to the Napier Bay Islands and lies north of Shoal Bay.

== Administration ==
Politically, Kyd Island, along with the neighbouring Napier Bay Islands, is part of Ferrargunj Taluk.

== Demographics ==
The island was formerly inhabited. An Andamani group of inhabitants 'Aca-Bea' used to live on Kyd Island.
