= James Island =

James Island may refer to:

- James Island (Gambia), a World Heritage island in the Gambia
- James Island (British Columbia), an island in Haro Strait off Sidney, BC near Vancouver Island
- James Island (Galápagos), another name for Santiago Island (Galápagos)
- James Island (Maryland), an island in Chesapeake Bay
- James Island (South Carolina), an island near Charleston, South Carolina
- James Island (San Juan Islands), one of the San Juan Islands in Washington
- James Island (Washington), near La Push, Washington
- James Island (Chile)
- James Island (sanctuary), island of India
- James Island, a name for Baffin Island used by 18th-century French cartographers
