= Way Back Home (travelogue) =

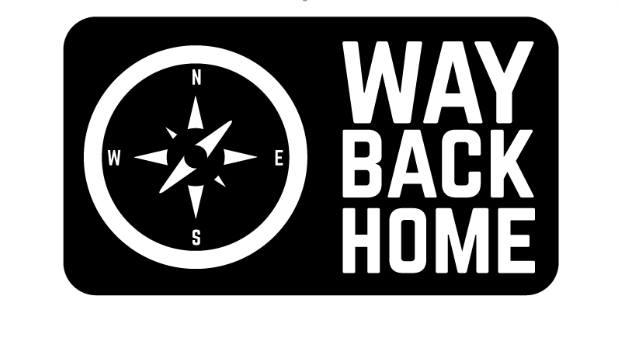

Way Back Home is an Indian travelogue series by filmmaker Rohan Thakur, produced by Asad Abid from Shoelace Films, a subsidiary of Gut and Flow Media Pvt.Ltd.

In the first season, entitled Way Back Home: A Himalayan Travelogue, Thakur travels the seven valleys of the Lower Himalayan Ranges. In the second season, Chapter II: Away from Home, Discovering The Andaman Islands, he was joined by coral reef researcher Nayantara Jain to explore the Andaman Islands.

== Way Back Home | A Himalayan Travelogue ==
In the first season, entitled Way Back Home: A Himalayan Travelogue, Thakur travels the seven valleys of the Lower Himalayan Ranges. The first season was co-directed by Thakur and Bharati Bahrani, and produced by Asad Abid, with Thakur also composing the background score and original music. The series was licensed to MTV Indies between 2014 and 2015, and relaunched on TheVibe Studios founded by Asad Abid. The series went on to be syndicated to 5 major territories worldwide including china and Asia Pacific regions under Discovery Networks.

=== Episodes ===
- Episode 1: Kullu and Manali - Thakur travels from Delhi to Manali, to find his hometown covered in a blanket of snow. He explores the narrow alleyways of the bazaar eating thukpa and momos, ending up on the streets of Old Manali. He discovers the process of "tandoor" making and bathes in hot Sulphur springs. He then introduces his favourite spots in and around Manali, including the local pine forest, a special picnic spot by the river and Jogni Falls, a local relaxation spot.
- Episode 2: Kullu Valley and Parvati Valley - In this episode, Thakur travels to Solang Nala to visit a skiing destination. He travels to the mysterious village of Malana in Parvati Valley to see how the villagers celebrate the festival of "Phaguli", the local New Year. The episode ends with a short hike up to Bijli Mahadev, a small temple dedicated to Shiva. This marks the end of the guide to Kullu, and the beginning of the journey into Thakur's home in Himachal.
- Episode 3: Mandi and Kangra Valley - Thakur makes his way to the holy town of Rewalsar, where the Buddhist community has come together to celebrate the birthday of the Great Master Padmasambhava. The main event of the day is the "Chham" or the "Devil's Dance" where a group of monks don elaborate costumes and masks and dance in perfect synchrony to depict tales of Great Buddhist Masters. Thakur then makes his way to the ancient Kangra Fort, nestled in the foothills of the Dhauladar Range. From here he travels to explore the village life in the quaint town of Bir, including jumping off a cliff.
- Episode 4 – Kangra Valley and Chamba Valley - While travelling around Kangra, Thakur visits a temple that remains submerged in the Maharana Pratap Sagar Lake for most of the year, and only emerges from the water during spring. He then drives into Chamba Valley to the remote town of Bharmour, from where he embarks on an eventful journey to the village of Kugti, the last village in Chamba Valley. Back in Kangra, he spends a relaxing few days in McLeodganj before trekking up to Triund to camp under the night sky.
- Episode 5 – Sangla Valley (Lower Kinnaur) - Leaving the foothills of Kangra behind, Thakur starts climbing higher towards the Sangla Valley in Kinnaur. While exploring the stone paved pathways of Kamru Village, he encounters a procession in which the local deity is visiting different households to bring in the New Year. The day ends in a party with much singing, dancing and drinking. The party continues in Sangla Valley as the New Year celebrations are followed by the festival of Holi. Thakur joins a parade from village to village as they perform skits and sing and dance while gathering an audience as they move. After five days of celebrations, the villagers bring out their deity to culminate the celebrations and to pray for a good year.
- Episode 6 – Upper Kinnaur - In Kalpa, Thakur again witnesses the celebration of the New Year, as bejeweled men and women dance to psychedelic music as the "Mountain Fairies" watch on. From Kalpa, he drives further up the valley to the village of Nako. Along the way, the landscape changes completely from lush, green grass covered slopes to bare, brown gigantic jagged mountains. The appearance, language, food, clothing, and religion of the local people also changes as he travels higher into the Himalayas.
- Episode 7 – Spiti Valley - Thakur observes the panoramic views in whitewashed Spiti, with the Kee Gompa standing prominently on top of a hill looking out at the vast valley below. He travels to the Upper Belt of Spiti to one of the highest villages, Kibber, where he stays with a retired teacher and learns about the harsh living conditions in the region. He then moves to a village called Dhankar, where he tries out high altitude organic farming with yaks.
- Episode 8 – Spiti Valley - Still in Spiti Valley, Thakur spends a day at the Tabo monastery. The statues and paintings in the pyramid-like structures are in near-perfect condition and provide a window into the past. He is then invited on a "ladies-day-out" with the women of Lari. The last stop in Spiti is Langza, "the Home of the Gods", one of the highest villages in the world. The local people of this area believe in the forgotten sect of Tantric Buddhism. Thakur witnesses a Tantric ritual that involves communication with the supernatural entities.
- Episode 9 – Lahaul Valley - Thakur treks across the Rohtang Pass to enter Lahaul where his family has its roots. He visits the village of Tholang, where his grandfather was from, and finds that it is no longer a village but rather a collection of concrete blocks amidst potato fields. Although Lahaul remains cut off from the rest of Himachal for almost half the year, it is among the most affluent areas of the state, but many have left the area in search of better opportunities. He then heads out to the small village of Teeling where his mother grew up, meeting two elderly aunts who take care of the family's home and fields, the rest of the family having moved away.
- Episode 10 – Lahaul Valley - Thakur visits the grand Mahakala Puja performed at the Shashur Gompa, where monks draped in maroon robes chant verses in Tibetan accompanied by cymbals and horns. In Upper Keylong, he explores an ancient Lahauli home to find out how people lived in the past. He ends his trip in Lahual at the Khangsar Khar, an abandoned and dilapidated castle in the heart of the valley.
- Episode 11 and 12 – Leh and Ladakh - Thakur recalls and reminisces his journey of the past few months, and goes on a bike ride across the valley to clear his mind. He also explores the influence of religion in the valley, and why it has become an international tourist destination. He also speaks to an expert about the unique architecture in the towns. Towards the end he also experiences a traditional Leh funeral ceremony, and wonders what to do with his life, at which point the show recaps some of the memorable moments of the journey.
- Episode 13 – Behind the Scenes - The last episode of the season goes behind the scenes with the cast and filmmakers, including executive producer Asad Abid, co-director Bharati Bahrani, and Thakur.

== Away From Home | Discovering The Andaman Islands ==
The second chapter of Way Back Home features marine biologist, coral reef researcher and ocean conservationist Nayantara Jain, who joins Thakur to explore the Andaman Islands. The series' five episodes were released on TheVibe's Facebook and YouTube pages. Away From Home was launched on TheVibe's Facebook and YouTube pages on 8 July 2016, to coincide with World Oceans Day 2016.

=== Episodes ===
- Episode 1 - Nayantara Jain picks up Thakur and Bahrani from the airport, before embarking on a ten-hour ferry "Dering" to the Little Andamans. During the journey they witness a school of dolphins. On the islands, they visit Andamans' famous forests with enormous trees, and visit some local attractions such as "The Big Waterfall."
- Episode 2 - In the second episode, Jain and Thakur continue to explore the Little Andamans. Jain takes Thakur surfing, after which they visit the Kaala Patthar Beach and its secret lagoon.
- Episode 3 - The third episode begins with Jain and Tahkur leaving in a convoy from Jirkatang as they travel through the Jarawa Tribal Reserve, where photography is strictly forbidden. They head to Mayabunder to John's Homestay. John introduces the travellers to the "Karen" people and their culture. Karens are the largest ethnic tribe in Burma, and were brought to the Andaman Islands from Burma by the British in 1925. The travellers then make their way to Aves Island, where Jain goes free diving in tropical waters.
- Episode 4 - The show moves from Mayabunder to Port Blair, as the travellers head to Havelock Island. Here they visit Beach Number 3, before exploring the small market of the town. The next day, Thakur and Jain meet Tanaz Noble, who runs a kayaking tour operation. The travellers go kayaking through the mangrove rainforests. Next, they visit Beach Number 7, also known as Radhanagar Beach, long considered one of Asia's most beautiful beaches.
- Episode 5 - Thakur and Jain visit the Lacadives scuba and diving centre, where Thakur tries scuba diving for the first time. Jain, herself a diving instructor, guides him to witness the aquatic life of the Andamans.
