= Stuart Island =

Stuart Island, Stewart Island, or Steward Island can refer to several different Islands:

- Stuart Island (Washington), one of the San Juan Islands in Washington state, the United States
- Stuart Island (British Columbia), an island in the Discovery Islands of British Columbia, Canada
- Stuart Island, Alaska
- Stewart Island, New Zealand
- Stewart Island (Andaman Islands), part of the Indian territory of Andaman and Nicobar Islands
- Sikaiana (formerly called the Stewart Islands), a small atoll in the Solomon Islands
- Steward Island, an uninhabited island in King Christian IX Land, at the eastern end of Greenland
