= Defence Islands (Andaman Islands) =

- Location within Andaman and Nicobar Islands

Geography
- Location: Bay of Bengal
- Coordinates: 11.95°N 92.60°E
- Archipelago: Andaman Islands
- Adjacent to: Indian Ocean
- Total islands: 7
- Major islands: Defence; Clyde Island; Montgomery Island; Petrie Island
- Area: 6.19 km^{2} (2.39 sq mi)
- Highest elevation: 0 m (0 ft)

Administration
- India
- District: South Andaman
- Island group: Andaman Islands
- Island sub-group: Great Andaman
- Tehsil: Ferrargunj Tehsil

Demographics
- Population: 0 (2011)
- Pop. density: 0.00/km^{2} (0/sq mi)
- Ethnic groups: Hindu, Andamanese

Additional information
- Time zone: IST (UTC+5:30)
- PIN: 744202
- Telephone code: 031927
- ISO code: IN-AN-00
- Official website: www.and.nic.in
- Literacy: 84.4%
- Avg. summer temperature: 30.2 °C (86.4 °F)
- Avg. winter temperature: 23.0 °C (73.4 °F)
- Sex ratio: 1.2♂/♀
- Census Code: 35.639.0004
- Official Languages: Hindi, English

Defence Islands are an island group of the Andaman Islands. It belongs to the South Andaman administrative district, part of the Indian union territory of Andaman and Nicobar Islands. The islands are situated 33.5 km (21 mi) north from Port Blair.

== Geography ==
The islands belongs to the Defence Group and lies in the sound of Jirkatang. at their southern islands, there is a natural harbour called Port Campbell.

== Administration ==
Politically, Defence Island, along neighboring islands, is part of Ferrargunj Taluk.
