= Defence Island Wildlife Sanctuary =

Island of the Andaman

Defence Island
- Location within Andaman and Nicobar Islands

Geography
- Location: Bay of Bengal
- Coordinates: 11.95°N 92.60°E
- Archipelago: Andaman Islands
- Adjacent to: Indian Ocean
- Area: 5.04 km^{2} (1.95 sq mi)
- Length: 5.4 km (3.36 mi)
- Width: 1.4 km (0.87 mi)
- Coastline: 14.4 km (8.95 mi)
- Highest elevation: 0 m (0 ft)

Administration
- India
- District: South Andaman
- Island group: Andaman Islands
- Island sub-group: Defence Islands, Andaman
- Tehsil: Ferrargunj Tehsil

Demographics
- Population: 0 (2011)

Additional information
- Time zone: IST (UTC+5:30)
- PIN: 744202
- Area code: 031927
- ISO code: IN-AN-00
- Official website: www.and.nic.in
- Literacy: 84.4%
- Avg. summer temperature: 30.2 °C (86.4 °F)
- Avg. winter temperature: 23.0 °C (73.4 °F)
- Sex ratio: 1.2♂/♀
- Census Code: 35.639.0004
- Official Languages: Hindi, English

Defence Island is an island of the Andaman Islands. It belongs to the South Andaman administrative district, part of the Indian union territory of Andaman and Nicobar Islands. The island is 33.5 km (21 mi) north of Port Blair.

== Geography ==
The island belongs to the Defence Group and lies in the sound of Jirkatang.Defence Island is an island of the Andaman Islands. It belongs to the South Andaman administrative district, part of the Indian union territory of Andaman and Nicobar Islands.[5] The island is 33.5 km (21 mi) north of Port Blair.

== Administration ==
Politically, Defence Island, along neighboring islands, is part of Ferrargunj Taluk.It is governed by Indian Government.
