= Netaji Smaraka Gramina Grandhasala, Ezhumanthuruthu =

Netaji Smaraka Gramina Grandhasala is a village library and reading room established in 1995 by the young boys of Ezhumanthuruthu, Kerala, India.

== Overview ==
This library is situated in a village called Ezhumanthuruthu in Kaduthuruthy Grama Panchayath of Vaikom Taluk in Kottayam district. Ezhumanthuruthu has a rich cultural heritage and tradition. Although the majority of the population is agri based, literate and educated people are actively participating in the development of the Village.

The library has been named after Netaji Subhas Chandra Bose. One of the main objectives is to introduce Netaji's contributions to the new generation on India's freedom struggle.

== Location ==
The library is working in its own building with 4500 books including children's books and reference books at the southern part of Ezhumanthuruthu. It is planned to move to the central junction to boost the function of the library. This place is about five kilometres from Kaduthuruthy central junction and the same distance from the nearby town of Thalayolaparambu.
