= 72nd meridian =

72nd meridian may refer to:

- 72nd meridian east, a line of longitude east of the Greenwich Meridian
- 72nd meridian west, a line of longitude west of the Greenwich Meridian

72nd meridian west	72nd meridian east
