= Way Back Home =

Way Back Home may refer to:

== Songs ==
- "Way Back Home" (Bag Raiders song), a 2010 single from Bag Raiders
- "Way Back Home" (Shaun song), from his extended play, Take
- "Way Back Home", an instrumental tune by the Jazz Crusaders, written by Wilton Felder.
- "Way Back Home", a single of the Jazz Crusaders tune with added lyrics, by Junior Walker and the All-Stars from their 1971 album Rainbow Funk
- "Way Back Home", a song from Prince's album Art Official Age
- "Way Back Home", Count Ossie & Mystic Revelation's Rastafari instrumental take on the tune by the Jazz Crusaders, written by Wilton Felder.
- "Behold", URoy and Tommy McCook's Ska-Bluebeat-Rocksteady take on Wilton Felder's-Jazz Crusader's "Way Back Home" composition.

== Albums ==
- Way Back Home (Bing Crosby album), 1951
- Way Back Home (Phil Keaggy album), 1986
- The Way Back Home, an album by Vince Gill, 1987

== Film ==
- Way Back Home (1931 film), an American drama film
- Way Back Home (2003 film), a documentary film
- Way Back Home (2011 film), a Filipino family drama film
- Way Back Home (2013 film), a South Korean drama film

== Other ==
- Way Back Home (travelogue), an Indian travelogue series
- Way Back Home, a Taiwanese television series starring Yang Li-yin
