= Tushnabad =

- Rural
- Location in the Andaman and Nicobar Islands Tushnabad (India)
- Coordinates: 11°40′28″N 92°38′35″E
- Country: India
- Union Territory: Andaman and Nicobar Islands
- District: South Andaman

Population (2011)
  - Total: 1,320
- Time zone: UTC+5.30 (IST)

Tushnabad (or Tusnabad) is a rural village in Ferrargunj, South Andaman, Andaman and Nicobar Islands. It is adjacent to the Jarawa Reserve

As of the 2011 census, Tushnabad had a population of 1320 people in 286 families, of which 681 are males while 639 are females. The literacy rate was 89.68% as per the census. The village is administrated by an Elected Pradhan(As of 30 July 2021 local government elections are still to be held - Delayed because of the Coronavirus Pandemic).

This area infrastructure includes a community hall, Senior Secondary School, Primary Health Centre.
