= Swamp Island =

Island of the Andaman Islands

- Location within Andaman and Nicobar Islands

Geography
- Location: Bay of Bengal
- Coordinates: 12°55′42″N 92°52′14″E
- Archipelago: Andaman Islands
- Adjacent to: Indian Ocean
- Area: 3.44 km^{2} (1.33 sq mi)
- Length: 2.9 km (1.8 mi)
- Width: 1.9 km (1.18 mi)
- Coastline: 10 km (6 mi)
- Highest elevation: 0 m (0 ft)

Administration
- India
- District: North and Middle Andaman
- Island group: Andaman Islands
- Island sub-group: Stewart Sound Group
- Taluk: Diglipur Taluk

Demographics
- Population: 0 (2016)

Additional information
- Time zone: IST (UTC+5:30)
- PIN: 744202
- Telephone code: 031927
- ISO code: IN-AN-00
- Official website: www.and.nic.in
- Literacy: 84.4%
- Avg. summer temperature: 30.2 °C (86.4 °F)
- Avg. winter temperature: 23.0 °C (73.4 °F)
- Sex ratio: 1.2♂/♀
- Census Code: 35.639.0004
- Official Languages: Hindi, English

Swamp Island is an island of the Andaman Islands. It belongs to the North and Middle Andaman administrative district, part of the Indian union territory of Andaman and Nicobar Islands. The island lies 140 km (87 mi) north from Port Blair.

== Geography ==
The island belongs to the Stewart Sound Group and lies west of Egg Island.

== Administration ==
Politically, Swamp Island, along neighboring Stewart Sound Group Islands, belongs to Diglipur Taluk.
