= Michael Lloyd Ferrar =

British Indian army officer and civil servant (1876–1971)

Lieutenant-Colonel Michael Lloyd Ferrar CSI CIE OBE (16 April 1876 – 25 February 1971) was a British Indian army officer and civil servant who worked as a chief commissioner of the Penal Settlement at Port Blair on Andaman Islands and Nicobar Islands.

Born 1876, son of Michael Lloyd Ferrar, Ferrar was educated at St. Columba's College, Rugby and the Royal Military College, Sandhurst where he was a contemporary of Winston Churchill. He joined the Indian Army at the age of 20 in 1896 and served on the North West Frontier during the Tirah Campaign 1897-98. Ferrar opted to move to join the Home Department of the Government of India in 1901 and was inducted into the Punjab Commission. He studied Urdu, Punjabi, Baluchi and Pashto. He was promoted to Captain in 1905, when he was Commandant of the Border Military Police Infantry. He was appointed an Officer of the Order of the British Empire (OBE) in 1919 for wartime service.

Before becoming Commissioner of the Andaman and Nicobar Islands he served at various positions in northern and northwestern parts of British India. From 1902-1906 he commanded the Baloch Levy, was a postal censor at Bombay, 1915-18, and deputy commissioner Lahore, 1919-23, during which time he was involved in the arrest of Lala Lajpat Rai and Satyanand Stokes on charges of sedition.

Ferrar was responsible for increasing agriculture on the Andamans. Under his management, tea, coffee and rubber were tried on the island and land was allotted to settlers between 1923 and 1926. On the advice of Colonel Christopher Covell, swamps were drained. Ferrargunj was named after him and was originally a settlement for Bhantus who were then designated as a criminal tribe. The settlement was attacked by Jarawas and Ferrar launched punitive measures against the Jarawas. He initiated measures to protect fishing grounds in the Andamans from being poached by Singapore fishermen for Trochus shells.

Ferrar was appointed a Companion of the Order of the Indian Empire (CIE) in the 1922 Birthday Honours, and a Companion of the Order of the Star of India (CSI) in the 1927 Birthday Honours.

Ferrar retired in 1931 and returned to England serving as a Major in the Home Guard around 1940-41. In 1932 he wrote a chapter on the history of Islam in India. His proficience in Indian languages led to him being appointed an examiner in Urdu at Cambridge University from 1934-62.

A keen naturalist and student of the butterfly fauna, he collected over 4000 specimens which are now in the Natural History Museum at London. He was in close contact with other lepidopterists such as Brigadier W. H. Evans who visited the Andamans towards the end of Ferrar's tenure there.

Ferrar's older sister, Beatrice, married Wolseley Haig.

== Arms ==
Coat of arms of Michael Lloyd Ferrar
Notes Granted 11 November 1898 by Sir Arthur Edward Vicars, Ulster King of Arms. Crest A dexter arm embowed in scale armour Argent charged with a horse show Sable the hand bare grasping a broken sword Proper pommel and hilt Gold. Escutcheon Or on a bend cotised Sable between three martlets of the second as many horse shoes of the field. Motto Ferre Va Ferme

Government offices
Preceded by Henry Beadon	Chief Commissioner of the Andaman and Nicobar Islands; 1923–1931	Succeeded by John Smith
