= Wandoor (Andaman and Nicobar Islands) =

Beach in India

Wandoor Beach is a beach located 25 km south-west of Sri Vijaya Puram, in South Andaman district.

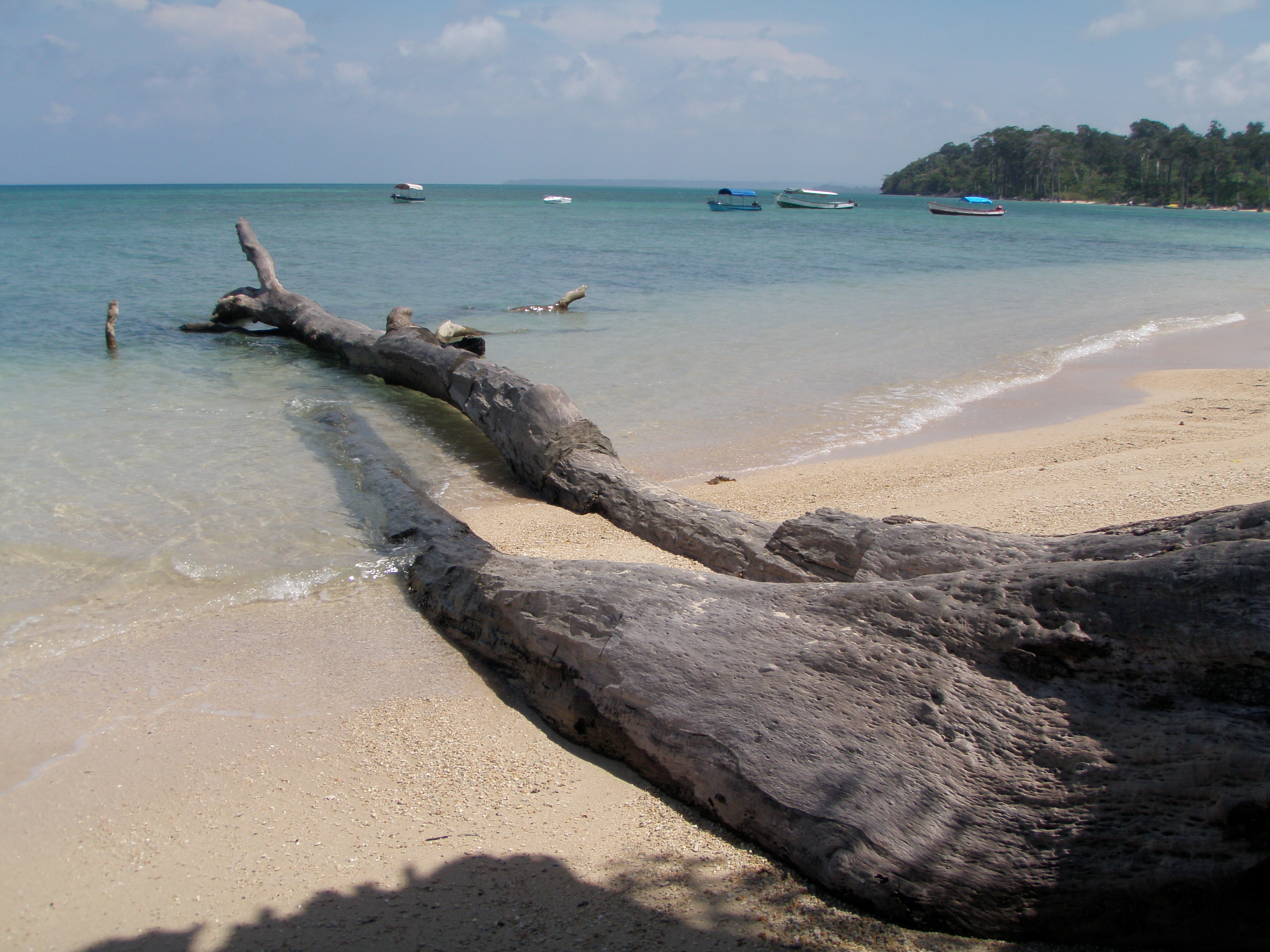
Wandoor Beach

One of the major attraction of the place is Mahatma Gandhi Marine National Park. The area has abundance of amphibian and marine wildlife. Saltwater crocodiles are often seen on shores.

A jetty which connects near by Islands like Jolly Buoy Island, Red Skin Island, Alexandra Island etc.

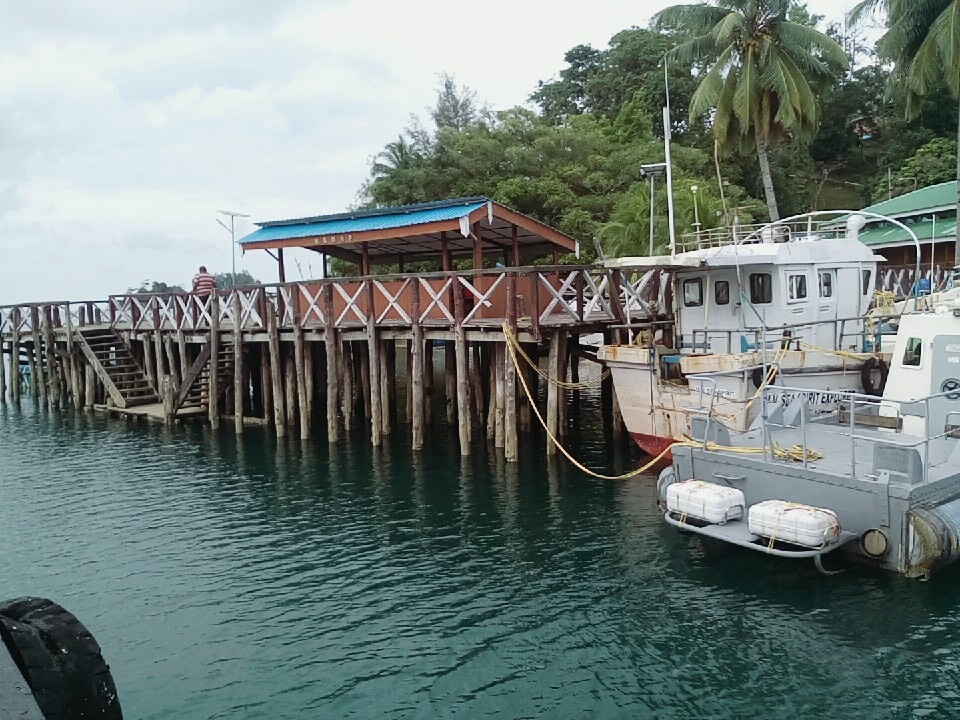
Jolly Buoy island jetty

Wandoor is also known for its backwater, lagoons and Mangroov forest.

The population of the village is 1,437 as per 2011 census. The economy of the village depends on fishing, and agricultural crops like paddy and coconut.
