= James Island (Andaman Islands) =

- Location within Andaman and Nicobar Islands

Geography
- Location: Bay of Bengal
- Coordinates: 11.95°N 92.727°E
- Archipelago: Andaman Islands
- Adjacent to: Indian Ocean
- Area: 0.91 km^{2} (0.35 sq mi)
- Length: 1.7 km (1.06 mi)
- Width: 0.6 km (0.37 mi)
- Coastline: 5.3 km (3.29 mi)
- Highest elevation: 0 m (0 ft)

Administration
- India
- District: South Andaman
- Island group: Andaman Islands
- Island sub-group: Napier Bay Islands
- Tehsil: Ferrargunj Tehsil

Demographics
- Population: 0 (2016)

Additional information
- Time zone: IST (UTC+5:30)
- PIN: 744202
- Telephone code: 031927
- ISO code: IN-AN-00
- Official website: www.and.nic.in
- Literacy: 84.4%
- Avg. summer temperature: 30.2 °C (86.4 °F)
- Avg. winter temperature: 23.0 °C (73.4 °F)
- Sex ratio: 1.2♂/♀
- Census Code: 35.639.0004
- Official Languages: Hindi, English

James Island is an island of the Andaman Islands. It belongs to the South Andaman administrative district, part of the Indian union territory of Andaman and Nicobar Islands. The island is 30 km (19 mi) north of Port Blair.

== Geography ==
The island belongs to the Napier Bay Islands and lies north of Shoal Bay.

== Administration ==
Politically, James Island, along neighboring Napier Bay Islands, are part of Ferrargunj Taluk.
