= Ghoramara Island =

Island in West Bengal, India

Coordinates: 21.914°N 88.129°E

- Location within West Bengal

Geography
- Location: Bay of Bengal
- Archipelago: Sundarbans

Administration
- India
- State: West Bengal
- District: South 24 Parganas

Ghoramara Island is an island 92 km south of Kolkata, India in the Sundarban Delta complex of the Bay of Bengal. The island is small, roughly five square kilometers in area, and is quickly disappearing due to erosion and sea level rise.

== Shrinking of island ==
The island has been said to be shrinking. A 2007 study by Jadavpur University concluded that roughly 31 square miles (80 km^{2}) of the Sundarbans had disappeared during the preceding 30 years, and that Ghoramara had shrunk to less than five square miles (thirteen square kilometres), about half its size in 1969: this loss of land had caused the displacement of more than 600 families.

== Population ==
Ghoramara island once had a population of 40,000. The 2001 Government of India census showed a population of 5,000 on Ghoramara; this population is believed to have shrunk as families are displaced by the island's sinking and many families are migrating in search of better livelihood. As of 2016 the island has 3,000 residents.

== See also ==
- Lohachara Island
- South Talpatti Island
