= Boning Island =

Island of the Andaman Islands

- Location within Andaman and Nicobar Islands

Geography
- Location: Bay of Bengal
- Coordinates: 12.28°N 92.76°E
- Archipelago: Andaman Islands
- Adjacent to: Indian Ocean
- Area: 3.004 km^{2} (1.160 sq mi)
- Length: 3.0 km (1.86 mi)
- Width: 1.6 km (0.99 mi)
- Coastline: 8.4 km (5.22 mi)
- Highest elevation: 0 m (0 ft)

Administration
- India
- District: North and Middle Andaman
- Island group: Andaman Islands
- Island sub-group: West Baratang Group
- Taluk: Rangat Taluk

Demographics
- Population: 0 (2016)

Additional information
- Time zone: IST (UTC+5:30)
- PIN: 744202
- Telephone code: 031927
- ISO code: IN-AN-00
- Official website: www.and.nic.in
- Literacy: 84.4%
- Avg. summer temperature: 30.2 °C (86.4 °F)
- Avg. winter temperature: 23.0 °C (73.4 °F)
- Sex ratio: 1.2♂/♀
- Census Code: 35.639.0004
- Official Languages: Hindi, English

Boning Island is an island of the Andaman Islands. It belongs to the North and Middle Andaman administrative district, part of the Indian union territory of Andaman and Nicobar Islands. The island lies 67 km (42 mi) north from Port Blair.

== Geography ==
The island belongs to the West Baratang Group and east of Port Anson and Talakaicha Island.

== Administration ==
Politically, Boning Island, along neighboring Baratang Islands, is part of Rangat Taluk.
