= 73rd meridian east =

Line of longitude

73rd meridian east

The meridian 73° east of Greenwich is a line of longitude that extends from the North Pole across the Arctic Ocean, Asia, the Indian Ocean, the Southern Ocean, and Antarctica to the South Pole.

The 73rd meridian east forms a great circle with the 107th meridian west.

== From Pole to Pole ==
Starting at the North Pole and heading south to the South Pole, the 73rd meridian east passes through:

Co-ordinates	Country, territory or sea	Notes
90°0′N 73°0′E	Arctic Ocean	
81°6′N 73°0′E	Kara Sea	
73°0′N 73°0′E	Gulf of Ob	
71°25′N 73°0′E	Russia	Gydan Peninsula
71°23′N 73°0′E	Gulf of Ob	
68°44′N 73°0′E	Russia	Yamal Peninsula
67°42′N 73°0′E	Gulf of Ob	
66°42′N 73°0′E	Russia	
54°3′N 73°0′E	Kazakhstan	
42°32′N 73°0′E	Kyrgyzstan	
40°53′N 73°0′E	Uzbekistan	For about 15 km at the easternmost point of the country
40°45′N 73°0′E	Kyrgyzstan	
39°21′N 73°0′E	Tajikistan	
37°18′N 73°0′E	Afghanistan	
36°52′N 73°0′E	Pakistan	Khyber Pakhtunkhwa; Gilgit-Baltistan - claimed by India; Khyber Pakhtunkhwa; Islamabad Capital Territory; Punjab - passing just west of Faisalabad
29°9′N 73°0′E	India	Rajasthan; Gujarat; Dadra and Nagar Haveli and Daman and Diu; Maharashtra - passing just east of Mumbai
18°3′N 73°0′E	Indian Ocean	
11°30′N 73°0′E	India	Lakshadweep - island of Kiltan
11°28′N 73°0′E	Indian Ocean	Passing just east of Kadmat Island, Lakshadweep, India; Passing just west of Minicoy Island, Lakshadweep, India
6°50′N 73°0′E	Maldives	Southern Thiladhunmathi Atoll, Northern Miladhunmadulhu Atoll, Northern Maalhosmadulhu Atoll and Southern Maalhosmadulhu Atoll
5°5′N 73°0′E	Indian Ocean	
4°18′N 73°0′E	Maldives	Ross Atoll
5°5′N 73°0′E	Indian Ocean	Passing just east of Ari Atoll, Maldives
3°18′N 73°0′E	Maldives	Northern Nilandhe Atoll, Southern Nilandhe Atoll and Kolhumadulhu Atoll
2°10′N 73°0′E	Indian Ocean	
0°32′N 73°0′E	Maldives	Huvadhu Atoll
0°17′N 73°0′E	Indian Ocean	Passing just west of Addu Atoll, Maldives; Passing between the McDonald Islands and Heard Island, Australia
60°0′S 73°0′E	Southern Ocean	
68°11′S 73°0′E	Antarctica	Australian Antarctic Territory, claimed by Australia

== See also ==
- 72nd meridian east
- 74th meridian east
