= Karlo Island =

Island of the Andaman Islands

- Location within Andaman and Nicobar Islands

Geography
- Location: Bay of Bengal
- Coordinates: 12.936°N 92.891°E
- Archipelago: Andaman Islands
- Adjacent to: Indian Ocean
- Area: 0.072 km^{2} (0.028 sq mi)
- Length: 0.4 km (0.25 mi)
- Width: 0.22 km (0.137 mi)
- Coastline: 1.2 km (0.75 mi)
- Highest elevation: 0 m (0 ft)

Administration
- India
- District: North and Middle Andaman
- Island group: Andaman Islands
- Island sub-group: Stewart Sound Group
- Taluk: Diglipur Taluk

Demographics
- Population: 0 (2016)

Additional information
- Time zone: IST (UTC+5:30)
- PIN: 744202
- Telephone code: 031927
- ISO code: IN-AN-00
- Official website: www.and.nic.in
- Literacy: 84.4%
- Avg. summer temperature: 30.2 °C (86.4 °F)
- Avg. winter temperature: 23.0 °C (73.4 °F)
- Sex ratio: 1.2♂/♀
- Census Code: 35.639.0004
- Official Languages: Hindi, English

Karlo Island is an island of the Andaman Islands. It belongs to the North and Middle Andaman administrative district, part of the Indian union territory of Andaman and Nicobar Islands. The island lies 142 km (88 mi) north from Port Blair.

== Geography ==
The island belongs to the Stewart Sound Group and lies between Oyster and Orchid Islands.

== Administration ==
Politically, Karlo Island, along neighboring Stewart Sound Group Islands, belongs to Diglipur Taluk.

== Demography ==
Karlo Island was previously inhabited. a small jetty and a sole house are all the remaining ruins of the village.
