= Sound Island =

- Location within Andaman and Nicobar Islands

Geography
- Location: Bay of Bengal
- Coordinates: 12.95°N 92.97°E
- Archipelago: Andaman Islands
- Adjacent to: Indian Ocean
- Area: 12.95 km^{2} (5.00 sq mi)
- Length: 6.7 km (4.16 mi)
- Width: 4.0 km (2.49 mi)
- Coastline: 37.3 km (23.18 mi)
- Highest elevation: 147 m (482 ft)

Administration
- India
- District: North and Middle Andaman
- Island group: Andaman Islands
- Island sub-group: Stewart Sound Group
- Taluk: Diglipur Taluk

Demographics
- Population: 0 (2016)
- Ethnic groups: Hindu, Andamanese

Additional information
- Time zone: IST (UTC+5:30)
- PIN: 744202
- Telephone code: 031927
- ISO code: IN-AN-00
- Official website: www.and.nic.in
- Literacy: 84.4%
- Avg. summer temperature: 30.2 °C (86.4 °F)
- Avg. winter temperature: 23.0 °C (73.4 °F)
- Sex ratio: 1.2♂/♀
- Census Code: 35.639.0004
- Official Languages: Hindi, English

Sound Island is an island of the Andaman Islands. It belongs to the North and Middle Andaman administrative district, part of the Indian union territory of Andaman and Nicobar Islands. The island lies 144 km (89 mi) north from Port Blair.

== History ==
The island was under the control of Japanese during World War II, and housed a small team of Japanese army personnel whose assignment was to sound and alert the army in Mayabunder of approaching enemy ships by sounding drums and bugles.

== Geography ==
The island belongs to the Stewart Sound Group and lies between Square Island and Goose Island. The island is the biggest of the group, having an area of almost 13 km^{2} (5.0 sq mi). Small Square Island 0.1 ha (0.25 acres), just at the southern tip, has an automated lighthouse located on it.

== Administration ==
Politically, Sound Island, along neighboring Stewart Sound Group Islands, is divided between Diglipur Taluk and Mayabunder Tehsil.
