= Sathar Island =

Island in Kerala, India

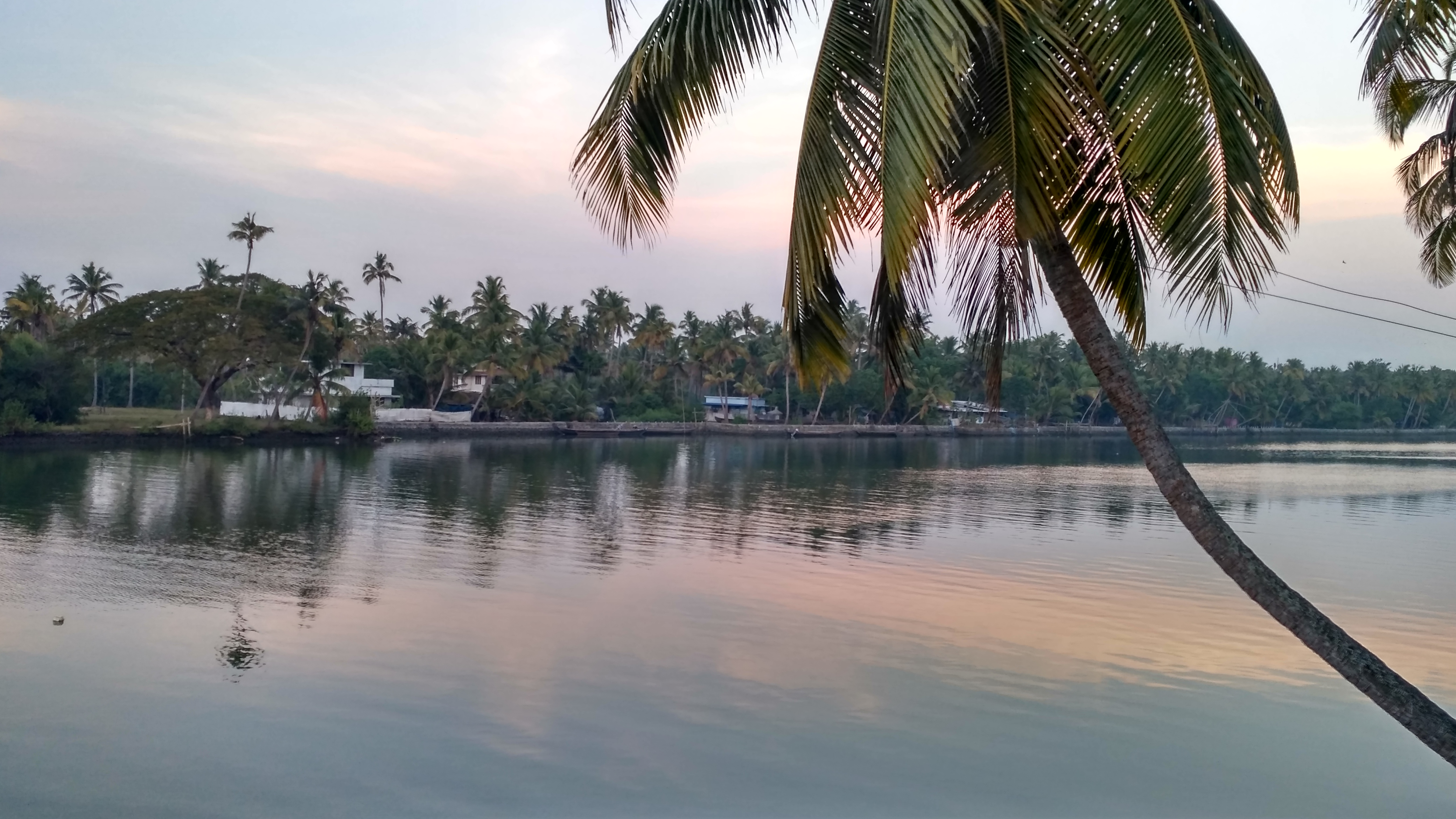
Sathar island

Sathar Island (10°11′26.34″N 76°11′28.88″E) is an island located in a distributary of the Periyar River in the Ernakulam district of the Indian state of Kerala. The land strip is about 2 km in length and 156 acres in area. The population is below 500. It is connected to the main land by Sathar island bridge.

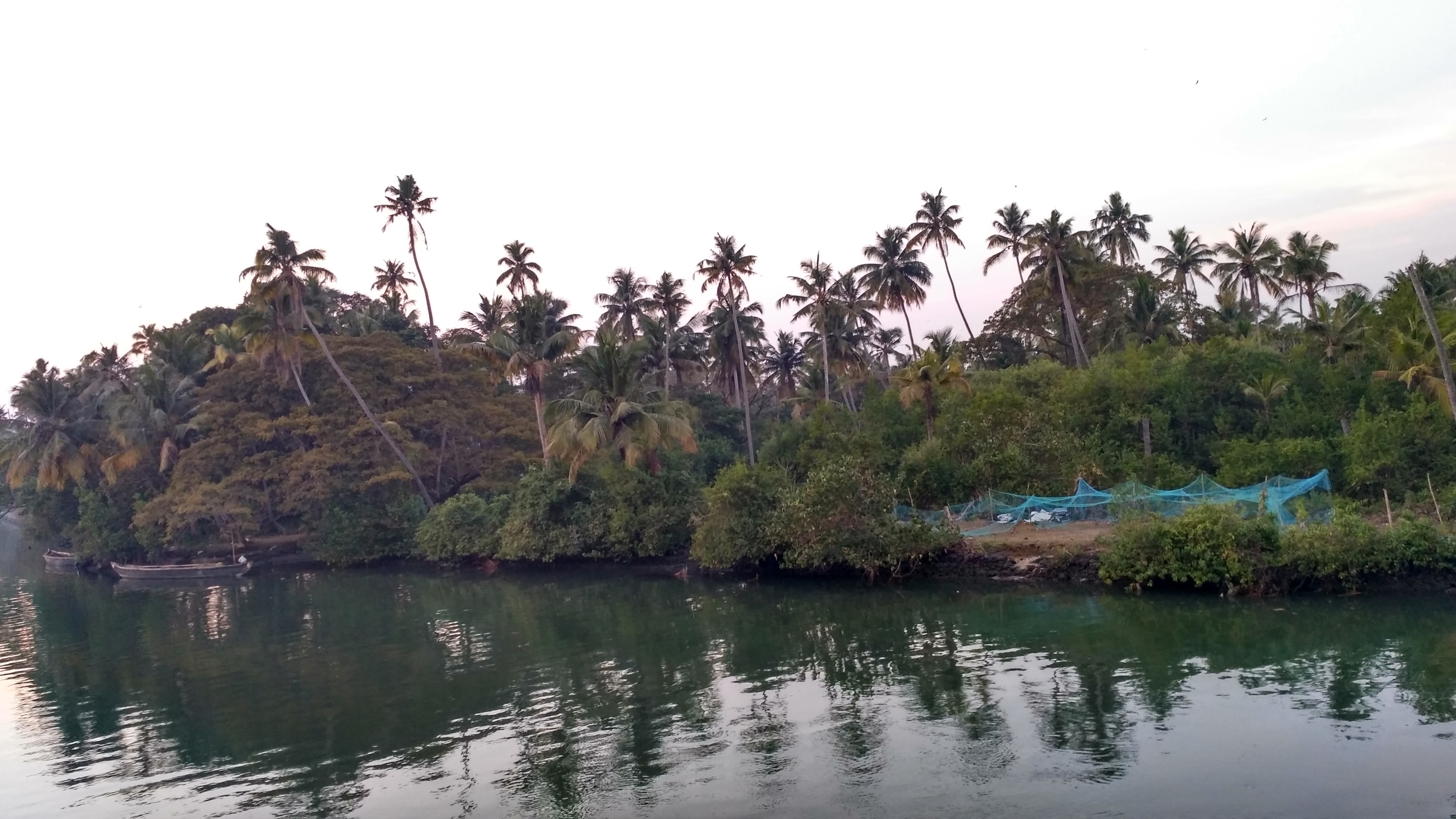
Sathar island a view from the bridge

== History ==
The mainland Sathar Island is believed to be created in mid 1800s. The original strip of land was much smaller and the main land is man-made island filled with soil.
