= Raneache Zuem =

Island in Goa, India

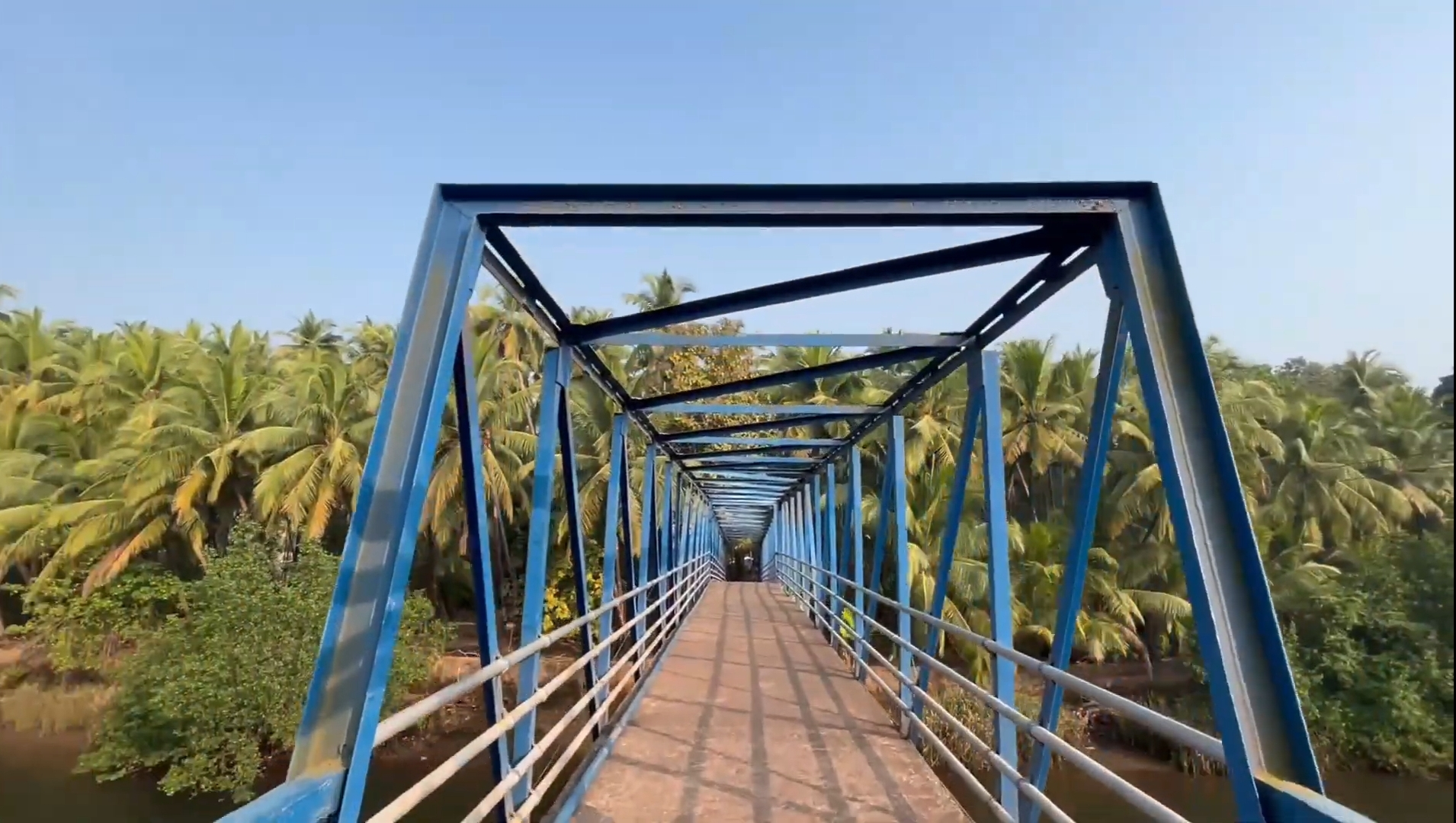
- Coconut plantations of Raneache Zuem as seen from the Zuem Bridge

- Etymology: Island of the Rane's

Geography
- Location: North Goa, Goa, India
- Coordinates: 15°40′21″N 73°51′13″E
- Type: Subcontinental island
- Adjacent to: Chapora River
- Length: 145 m (476 ft)
- Width: 780 m (2560 ft)
- Sarpanch: Paresh D. Gawas
- Deputy Sarpanch: Vishwajya V. Haldankar

Demographics
- Languages: Konkani; English

Additional information
- Time zone: IST (UTC+5:30)
- Official website: vpnadora.com

Raneache Zuem (transl. Rane's Island) is a small island situated within the North Goa district of Goa, a coastal state in India. It is near the village of Revora, with the two connected by a tourist spot called Zuem Bridge (Island Bridge). This island, located on the banks of the Chapora River, is home to approximately 26 to 30 houses. Administratively, the island falls under the jurisdiction of the Nadora village panchayat, which is part of the Bardez Taluka.

== History ==
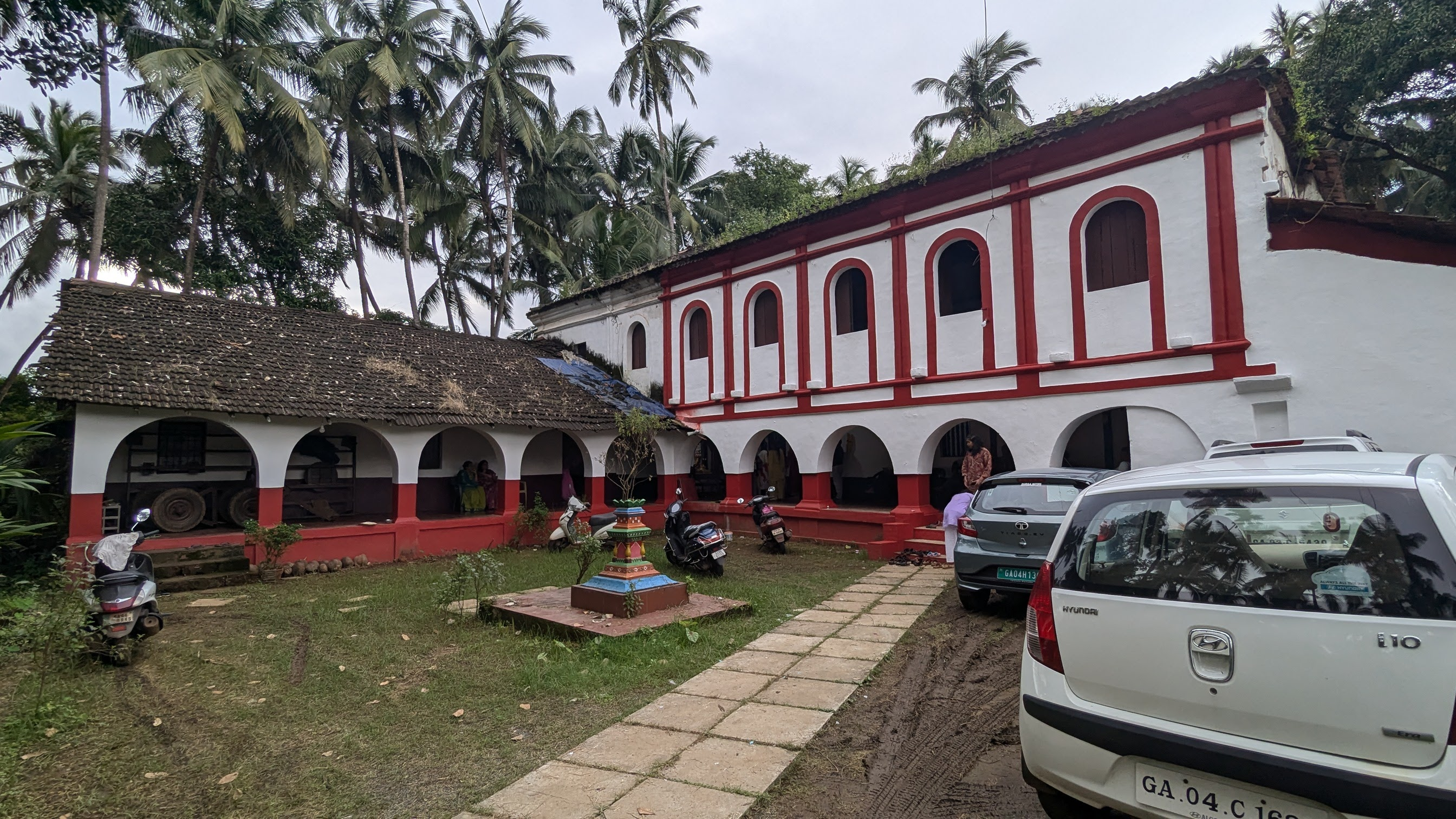
Rane house at Raneache Zuem

The Rane clan and other individuals settled in Raneache Zuem approximately 350 years ago, around 1673. The island is known for its unique traditions, which are still observed today. One of these traditions is the celebration of the Ganesh Chaturthi festival, which has been a significant part of the inhabitants' lives for over three and a half centuries. The festival is known for its elaborate decorations called chitras, which attract visitors from nearby regions such as Bardez, Pernem, Bicholim, and neighboring villages in Maharashtra.

The local families have made concerted efforts to preserve this tradition since the time of Portuguese India, and their houses are often referred to as "Wings of the freedom struggle of Goa," as stated by Raj Singh Rane, a member of the Rane family.

== Characteristics ==
The island is also known for its green vegetation, primarily attributable to the extensive cultivation of areca nut trees. The island is home to Rashtroli temple, a Hindu temple. The prominent highlight of the island is an ancestral residence, dating back 350 years, which stands as the largest house and is owned by the local landlords known as bhatkars. The island has several other ancestral houses from the Portuguese era, each exceeding 300 years in age, distinguished by the distinctive wooden columns supporting the roof beams.

== Festivals ==
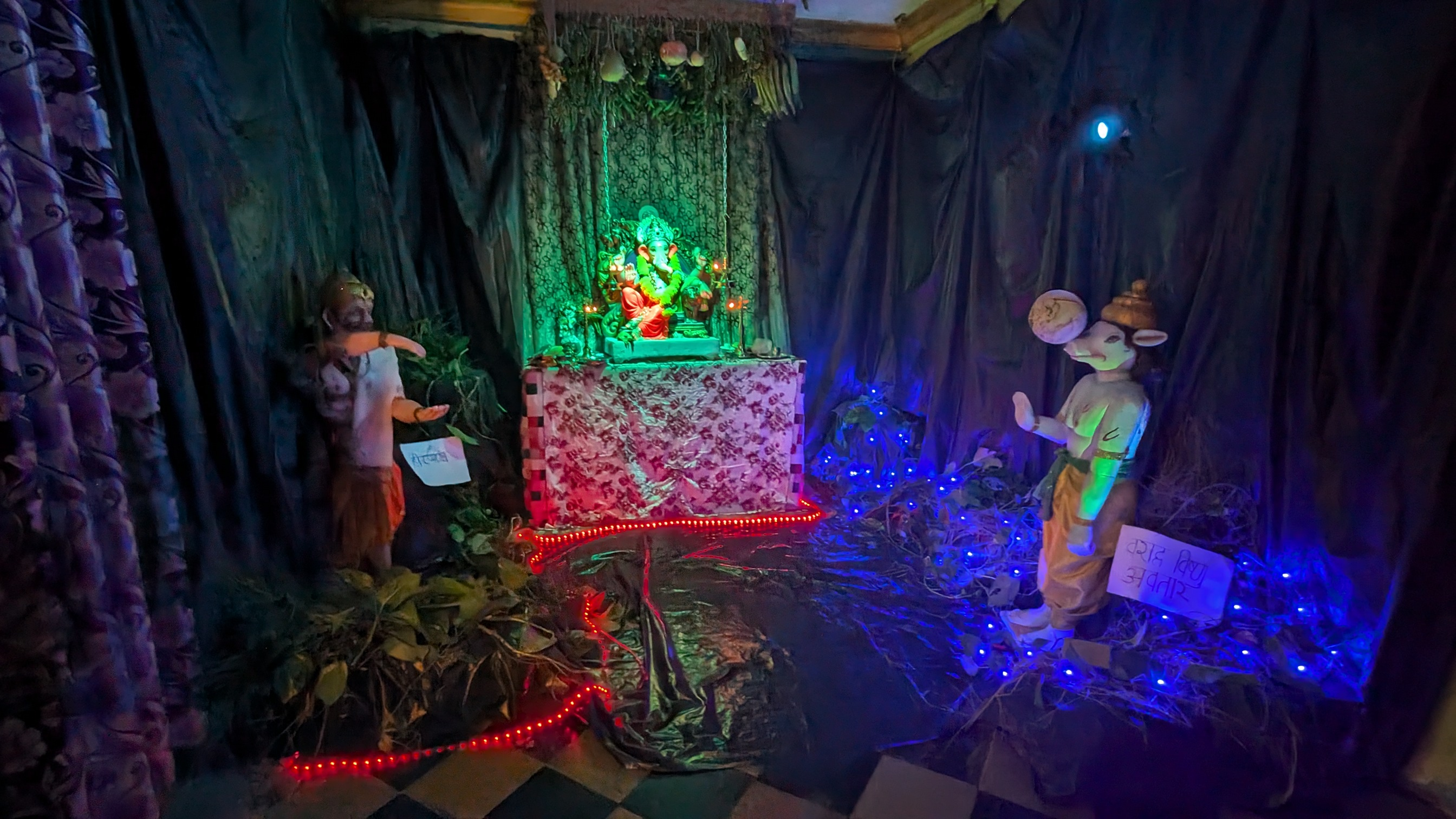
Ganesh Chaturthi in a house at Raneache Zuvem, featuring a 'chitra'

In the annual celebration of Ganesh Chaturthi, the inhabitants of the island welcome visitors by inviting them into their homes. As part of this festive tradition, they showcase artistic tableaux known as chitras. These displays portray significant scenes from the Hindu religion and narratives related to Ganesha. These chitras are crafted with materials such as clay, paper, wood and cloth.
