= Mahatma Gandhi Marine National Park =

National park on the Andaman Islands in India

Mahatma Gandhi Marine National Park (M.G.M.N.P)
- IUCN category II (national park)
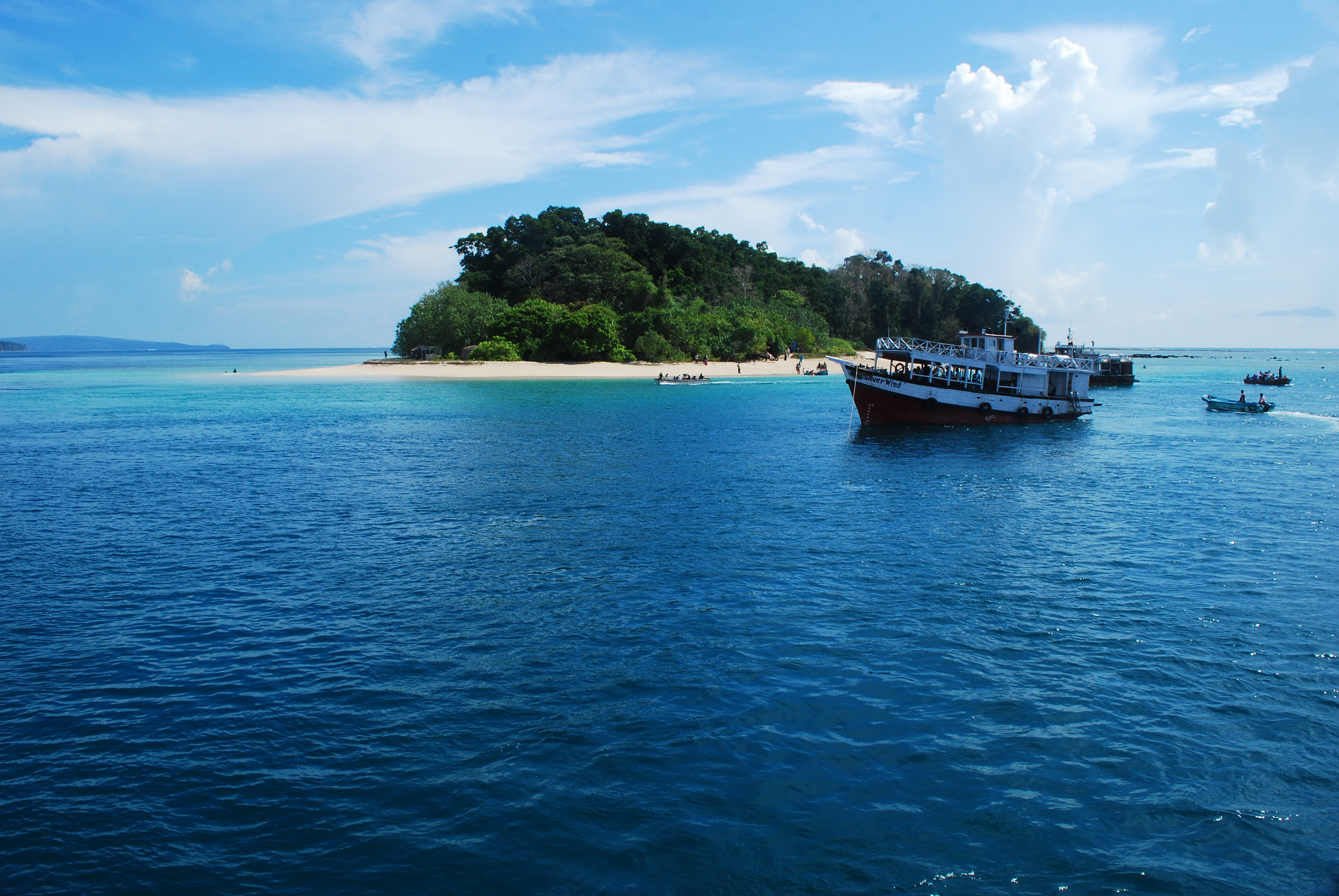
- Jolly Buoy Island in Mahatma Gandhi Marine National Park near Port Blair, Andaman Islands.
- Interactive map of Mahatma Gandhi Marine National Park (M.G.M.N.P)
- Location: Andaman Islands, India
- Nearest city: Wandur
- Area: 281.5 km^{2} (108.7 sq mi)
- Established: 1983

Labyrinth Islands
Nickname: North Mahatma Gandhi Islands
- Location within Andaman and Nicobar Islands

Geography
- Location: Bay of Bengal
- Coordinates: 11.53°N 92.60°E
- Archipelago: Andaman Islands
- Adjacent to: Indian Ocean
- Total islands: 17
- Major islands: Boat; Red Skin
- Area: 29.043 km^{2} (11.214 sq mi)land area
- Highest elevation: 78 m (256 ft)
- Highest point: Tarmugli Island

Administration
- India
- District: South Andaman
- Island group: Andaman Islands
- Island sub-group: Rutland Archipelago
- Tehsil: Port Blair Tehsil
- Largest settlement: Jolly Buoy Beach

Demographics
- Population: 0 (2011)

Additional information
- Time zone: IST (UTC+5:30)
- PIN: 744103
- Telephone code: 031927
- Official website: www.andamans.gov.in/Brochures/ef/MGMNP.pdf
- Census Code: 35.639.0004
- Official Languages: Hindi, English

Mahatma Gandhi Marine National Park is a national park in India, near Wandoor on the Andaman Islands. It belongs to the South Andaman administrative district, part of the Indian union territory of the Andaman and Nicobar Islands.

== History ==
The park was created on 24 May 1983 under the Wildlife Protection Act of 1972 to protect marine life such as the corals and nesting sea turtles prevalent in the area. It was placed under the protection of the Chief Wildlife Warden of the forest department of the Andaman and Nicobar Islands. The open creeks running through the park area were a special attraction.

== Gallery ==
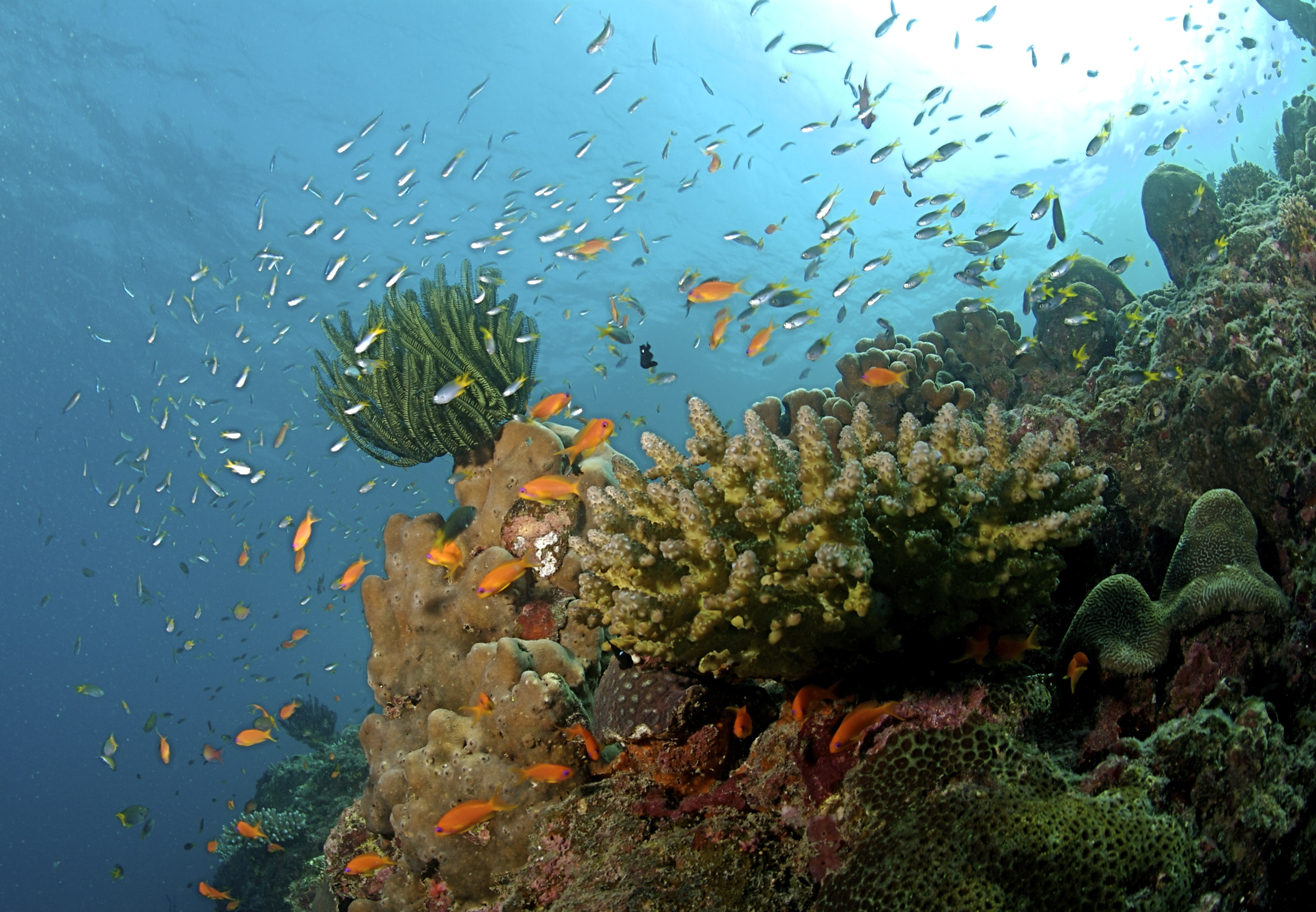
Coral reef

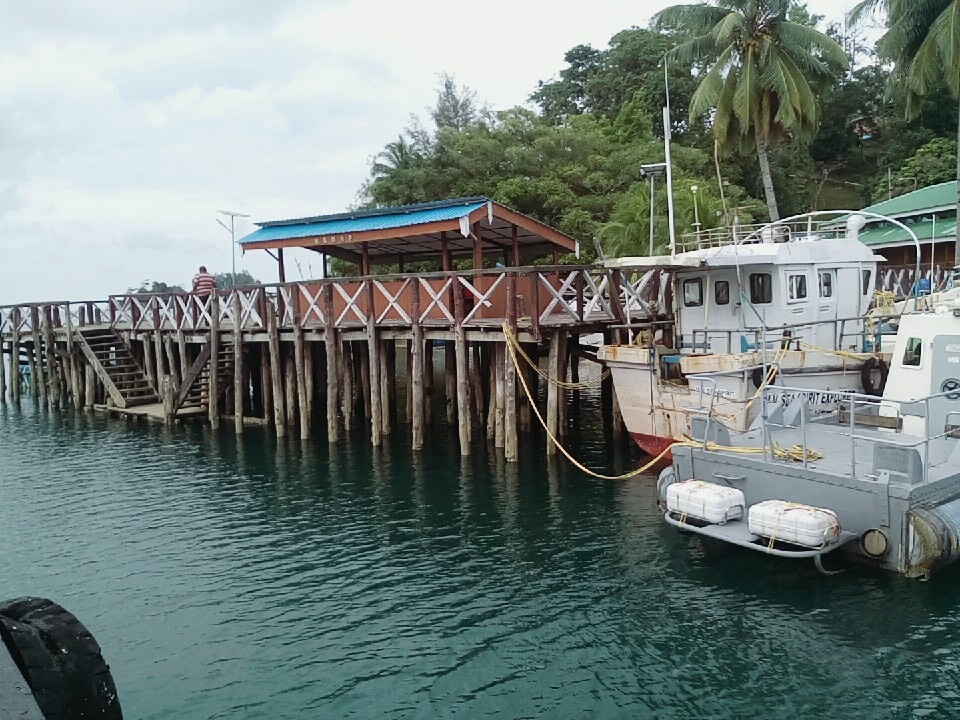
Island dock

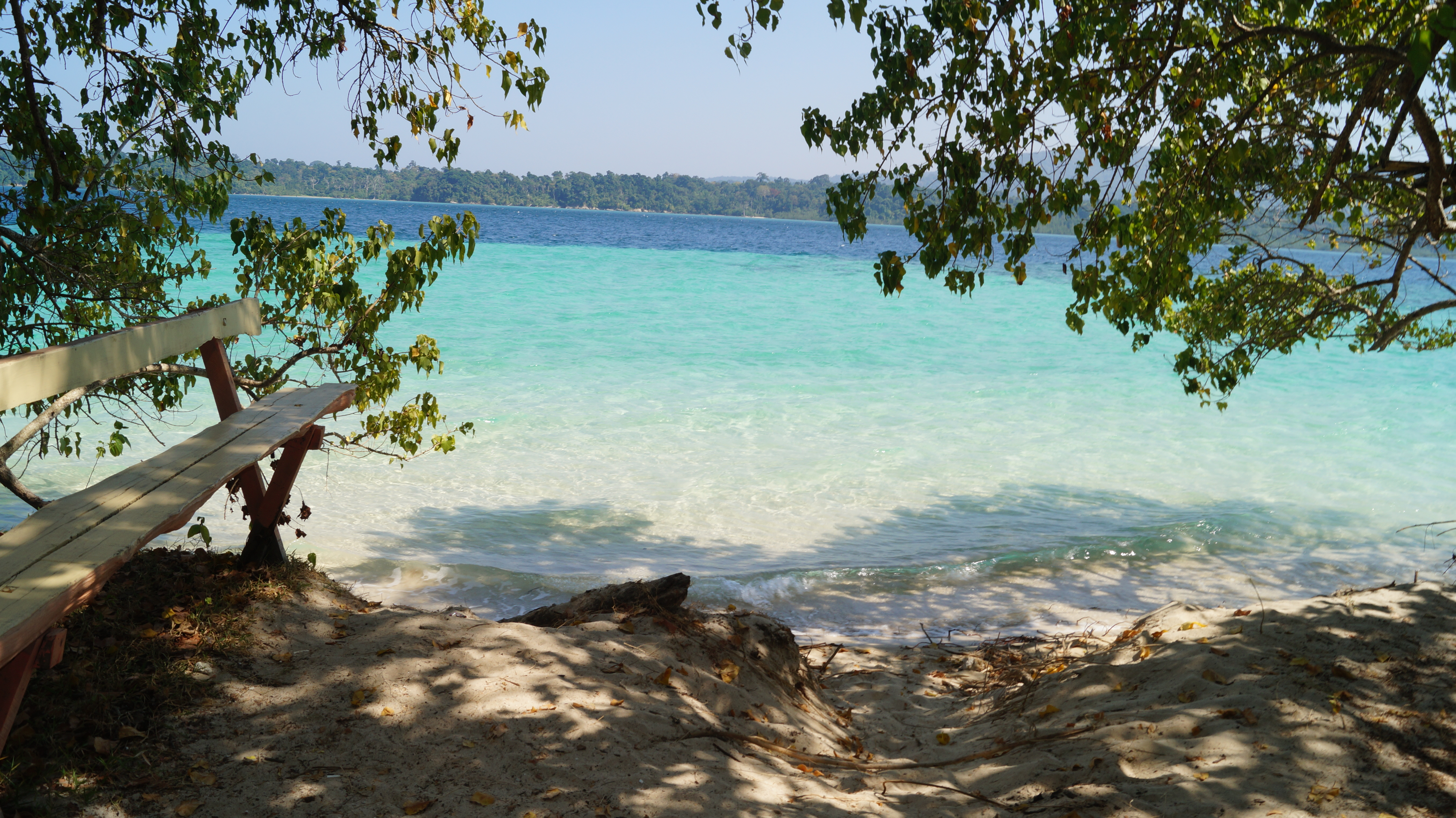
Beach on Jolly Buoy Island

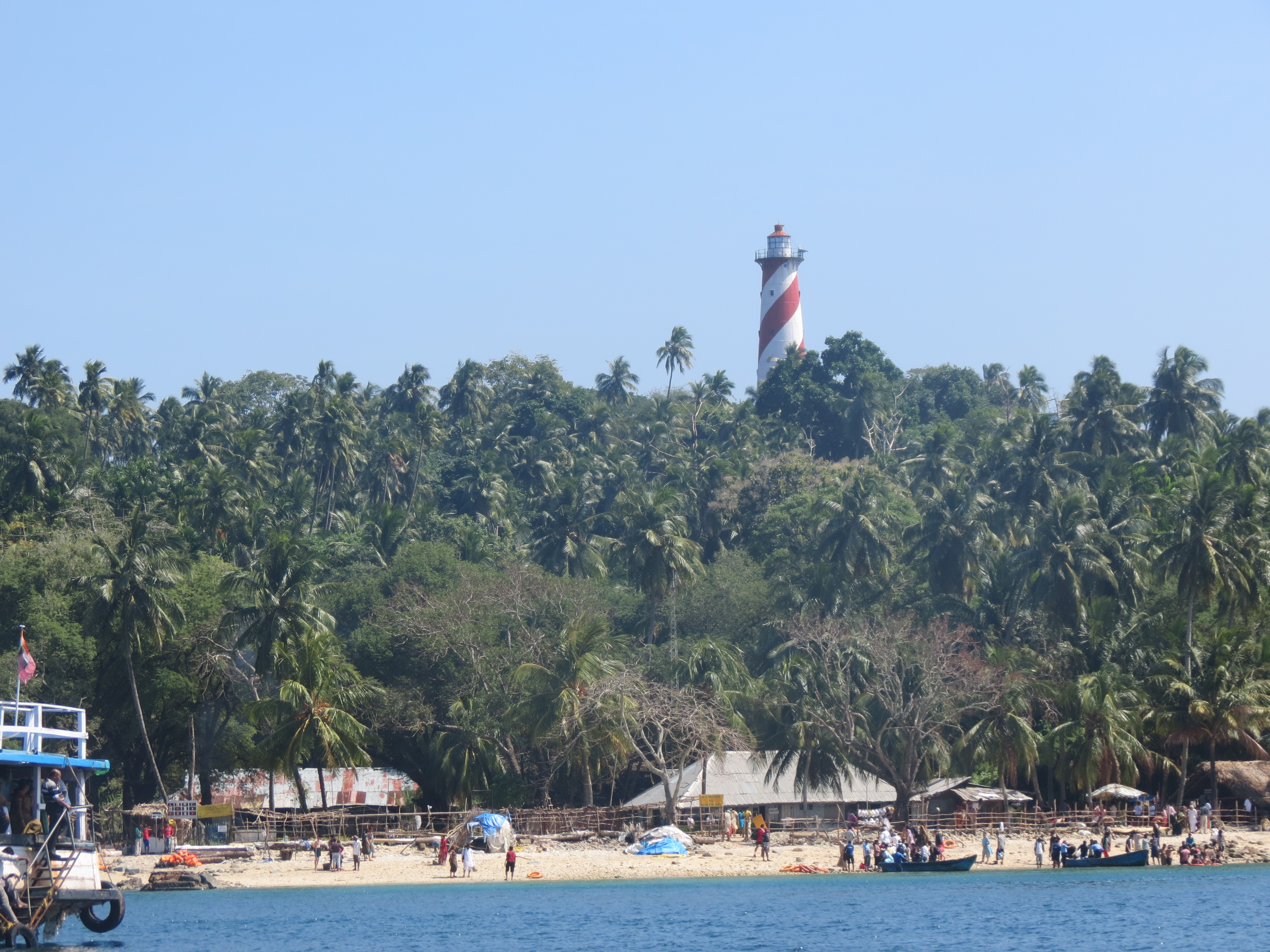
Beachside view

== Geography ==
The park is located about 20 km southwest of Port Blair, in the marine area west of the islands of South Andaman and Rutland. There are two major island groups in the park: the Labyrinth Islands and the Twin Islands.

The marine park covers 281.5 km^{2} made up of 17 islands and the sea channels running through the area. There are ecotourism businesses operating to the islands of Jolly Buoy and Red Skin.

=== Ecosystems of the islands ===
Most of the coral reefs in the park are fringing reefs. The type and composition of vegetation varies from island to island. Most notably there you can see a difference between the tourist islands which suffer more anthropocentric change and others which do not. There are also some islands more isolated or protected from the effects of weather in the Bay of Bengal. Tarmugli, the largest island, is covered with thick mangrove vegetation, sand covered beaches, uprooted trees and sheet rocks. Twin Islands are an important breeding ground for turtles within the park.

=== List of islands ===
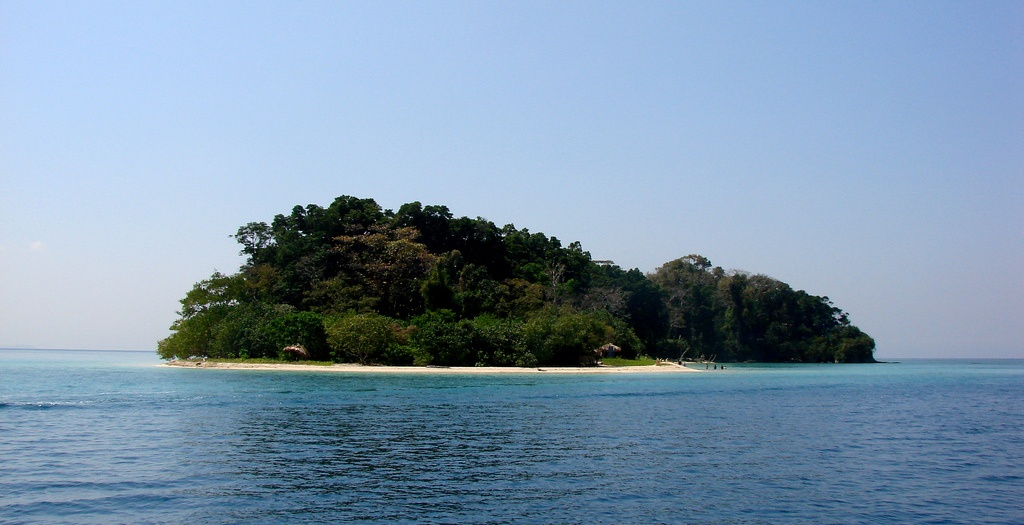
Jolly Buoy Island, one of the 20 islands in the national park

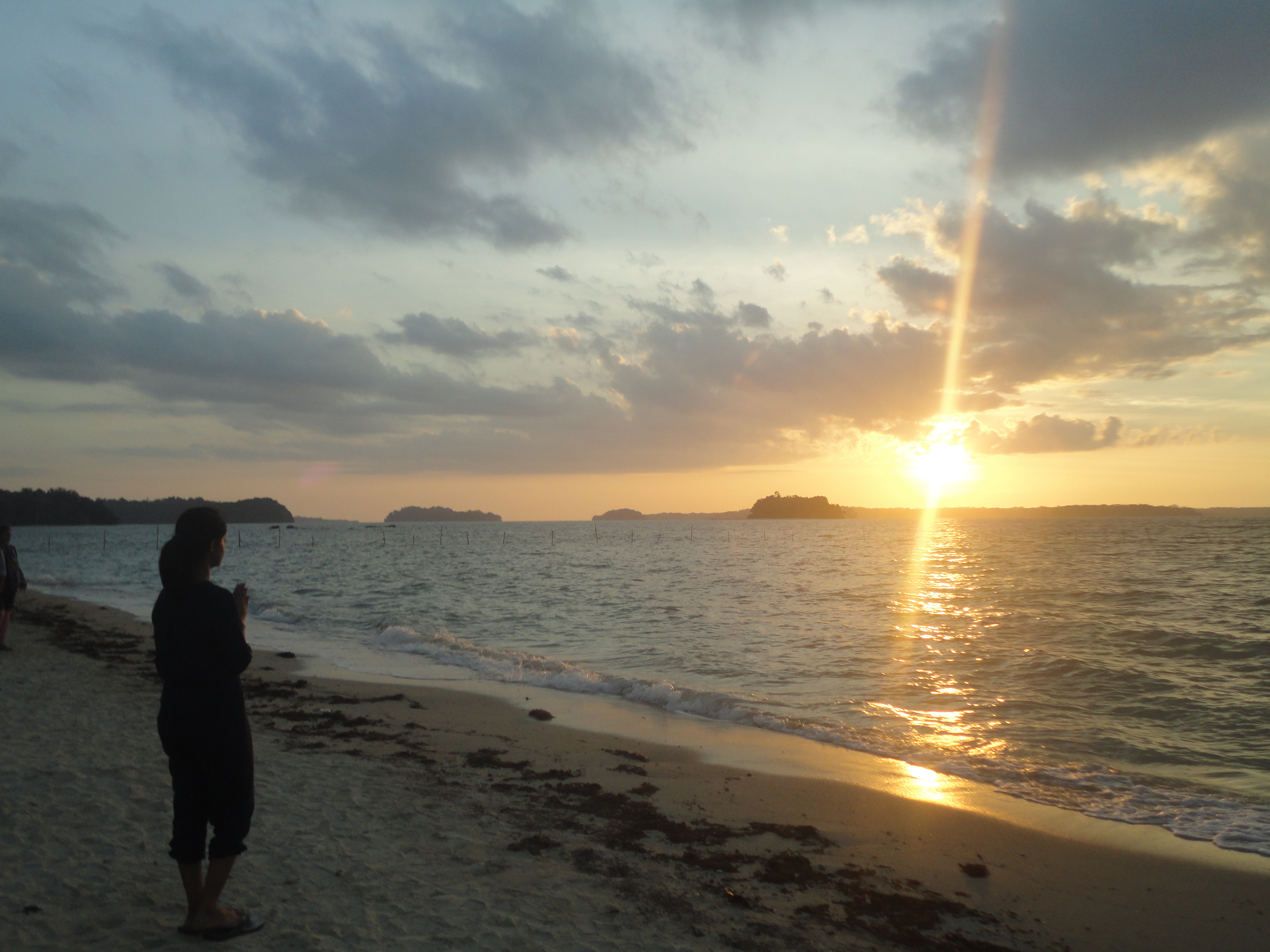
Mahatma Gandhi Marine National Park during sunset

Mahatma Gandhi Marine National Park has some 20 islands and rocks, with a total land area of 2,904.5 hectares (7,177 acres). The islands are uninhabited.

	Name	Location	Area (hectares)	Coastline (km)	Length (km)	Width (km)	elevation (m)
1	Alexandra Island	11°34′36″N 92°36′38″E	408.8	9.3	2.5	2.00	
2	Bell Island	11°34′08″N 92°33′57″E	6.7	1	0.38	0.21	
3	Boat Island	11°31′35″N 92°33′38″E	247.6	7.71	2.7	1.3	27.00
4	Chester Island	11°33′06″N 92°35′10″E	6.6	1.00	0.33	0.33	
5	Grub Island	11°33′06″N 92°35′10″E	2.3	0.7	0.13	0.25	24.00
6	Hobday Island	11°32′40″N 92°36′42″E	367.80	10.50	3.23	1.91	
7	Jolly Buoy Island	11°30′26″N 92°36′41″E	18.80	2.50	1.10	0.20	45.00
8	Malay Island	11°31′48″N 92°36′12″E	80.20	4.25	1.71	0.61	68.00
9	Pluto Island	11°33′06″N 92°35′10″E	13.3	1.81	0.75	0.22	49.00
10	Red Skin Island	11°33′00″N 92°35′30″E	428.20	12.39	4.9	1.4	46.00
11	Riflemen Island	11°30′50″N 92°38′40″E	2.40	0.70	0.27	0.15	0.00
12	Snob Island	11°35′55″N 92°34′27″E	17.65	2.18	0.96	0.26	75.00
13	Tarmugli Island	11°34′30″N 92°33′00″E	1216.70	20.00	5.5	3.8	78.00
14	West Twin Island	11°33′06″N 92°35′10″E	38.70				48.00
15	East Twin Island	11°33′06″N 92°35′10″E	20.00				44.00
16	North Hobday Island	11°33′30″N 92°36′30″E	17.80	1.93			
17	Rutland Island	11°33′38″N 92°35′55″E					

== Administration ==
Politically, all islands are part of Port Blair Taluk.
