= Nicholson Island (Ritchie's Archipelago) =

Nickname: Sir John Nicholson Island
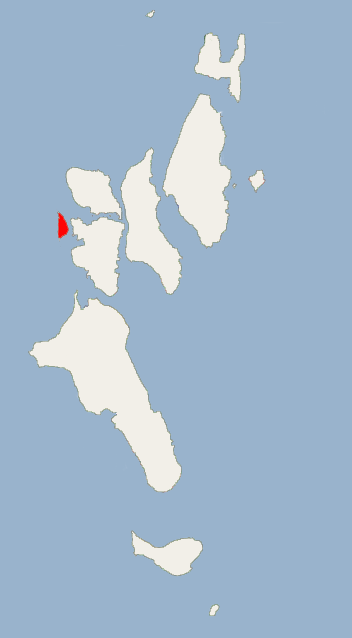
- Location of Nicholson Island in Ritchie's Archipelago

- Location of Nicholson Island in Andaman and Nicobar Islands Nicholson Island (Ritchie's Archipelago) (India)

Geography
- Location: Bay of Bengal
- Coordinates: 12.100°N 92.952°E
- Archipelago: Andaman Islands
- Adjacent to: Indian Ocean
- Area: 1.51 km^{2} (0.58 sq mi)
- Length: 3.5 km (2.17 mi)
- Width: 0.8 km (0.5 mi)
- Coastline: 8 km (5 mi)
- Highest elevation: 97 m (318 ft)
- Highest point: North Hill

Administration
- India
- District: South Andaman
- Island group: Andaman Islands
- Island sub-group: Ritchie's Archipelago
- Tehsil: Port Blair Tehsil

Demographics
- Population: 0 (2011)

Additional information
- Time zone: IST (UTC+5:30)
- PIN: 744202
- Telephone code: 031927
- ISO code: IN-AN-00
- Official website: www.and.nic.in

Nicholson Island is an island of the Andaman Islands. It belongs to the South Andaman administrative district, part of the Indian union territory of Andaman and Nicobar Islands. The island is 52 km (32 mi) northeast from Port Blair.

== Etymology ==
Nicholson is named after Brigadier general John Nicholson (East India Company officer).

== Geography ==
The island belongs to the Ritchie's Archipelago and is located west of Peel Island. The waters surrounding Wall Point in the south of the island is a major tourist diving spot.

== Administration ==
Politically, Nicholson Island is part of Port Blair Taluk.

== Demographics ==
The island is uninhabited.

== Image gallery ==
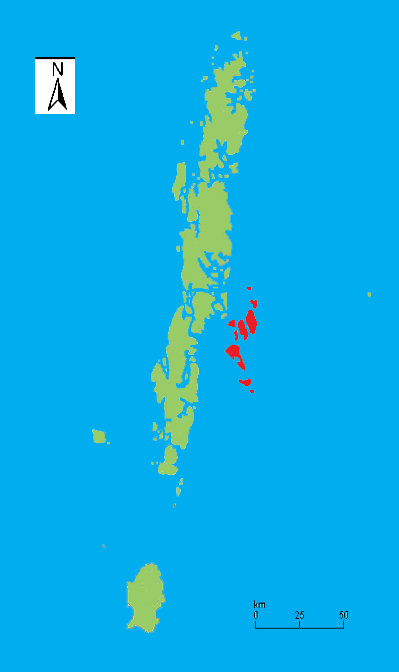
Outline map of the Andaman Islands, with Ritchie's Archipelago highlighted (in red).
