= Stewart Island (Andaman Islands) =

Island in the Bay of Bengal

- Location within Andaman and Nicobar Islands

Geography
- Location: Bay of Bengal
- Coordinates: 13.01°N 92.93°E
- Archipelago: Andaman Islands
- Adjacent to: Indian Ocean
- Area: 7.05 km^{2} (2.72 sq mi)
- Length: 3.9 km (2.42 mi)
- Width: 2.9 km (1.8 mi)
- Coastline: 13.00 km (8.078 mi)
- Highest elevation: 0 m (0 ft)

Administration
- India
- District: North and Middle Andaman
- Island group: Andaman Islands
- Island sub-group: Stewart Sound Group
- Taluk: Diglipur Taluk

Demographics
- Population: 2 (2016)
- Pop. density: 0.28/km^{2} (0.73/sq mi)
- Ethnic groups: Hindu, Andamanese

Additional information
- Time zone: IST (UTC+5:30)
- PIN: 744202
- Telephone code: 031927
- ISO code: IN-AN-00
- Official website: www.and.nic.in
- Literacy: 84.4%
- Avg. summer temperature: 30.2 °C (86.4 °F)
- Avg. winter temperature: 23.0 °C (73.4 °F)
- Sex ratio: 1.2♂/♀
- Census Code: 35.639.0004
- Official Languages: Hindi, English

Stewart Island is an island of the Andaman Islands. It belongs to the North and Middle Andaman administrative district, part of the Indian union territory of Andaman and Nicobar Islands. The island lies 150 km (93 mi) north of Port Blair. Its population only consists of two people.

== Geography ==
The island belongs to the Stewart Sound Group and lies between Dottrel island and Curlew Island. The island is small, having an area of 7.05 km^{2} (2.72 sq mi).

== Administration ==
Politically, Stewart Island, along neighboring Stewart Sound Group Islands, is part of Diglipur Taluk.

== Transportation ==
Ferry service is available from Mayabunder, on demand.

== Demographics ==
There is only 1 village, located at 13.012°N 92.939°E. According to the 2011 census of India, the Island has 1 households. The effective literacy rate (i.e. the literacy rate of population excluding children aged 6 and below) is 100%.

Demographics (2011 Census)
	Total	Male	Female
Population	2	2	0
Children aged below 6 years	0	0	0
Scheduled caste	0	0	0
Scheduled tribe	2	2	0
Literates	2	2	0
Workers (all)	2	2	0
Main workers (total)	2	2	0
