= Paget Island (Andaman Islands) =

- Location within Andaman and Nicobar Islands

Geography
- Location: Bay of Bengal
- Coordinates: 13.43°N 92.83°E
- Archipelago: Andaman Islands
- Adjacent to: Indian Ocean
- Total islands: 1
- Major islands: Paget
- Area: 4.80 km^{2} (1.85 sq mi)
- Length: 2.23 km (1.386 mi)
- Width: 2.72 km (1.69 mi)
- Coastline: 9.84 km (6.114 mi)

Administration
- India
- District: North and Middle Andaman
- Island group: Andaman Islands
- Island sub-group: Temple Sound Group
- Taluk: Diglipur Taluk

Demographics
- Population: 0 (2016)
- Pop. density: 0/km^{2} (0/sq mi)
- Ethnic groups: Hindu, Andamanese

Additional information
- Time zone: IST (UTC+5:30)
- PIN: 744202
- Telephone code: 031927
- ISO code: IN-AN-00
- Official website: www.and.nic.in
- Avg. summer temperature: 30.2 °C (86.4 °F)
- Avg. winter temperature: 23.0 °C (73.4 °F)
- Sex ratio: 15.0♂/♀
- Census Code: 35.639.0004

Paget Island is an island of the Andaman Islands. It belongs to the North and Middle Andaman administrative district, part of the Indian union territory of Andaman and Nicobar Islands. the island is lying 195 km (121 mi) north from Port Blair.

== Geography ==
The island is in the Temple Sound area of North Andaman shores. It is 76 m high to the tops of the trees. Point Island lies 0.5 nmi (0.93 km) to its southwest.

== Administration ==
Politically, Paget Island, along neighboring Temple Sound Islands, is part of Diglipur Tehsil.
