= Kattupalli (Ervadi) =

- place
- Location in Tamil Nadu, India
- Coordinates: 9.213°N 78.715°E
- Country: India
- State: Tamil Nadu
- District: Ramanathapuram district

Languages
  - Official: Tamil
- Time zone: UTC+5:30 (IST)
- Website: www.ervadi.com

Kattupalli is a separate area in Ervadi, Ramanathapuram district where the graves of the followers who came along with Badhusha Sultan Syed Ibraaheem Shaheed are found. Kattupalli is one of the main places where the war between Pandyas and Arabs was held. It is also the graveyard of Arabs where the Dargah's of all the important ministers of Sulthan Syed Ibrahim Shaheed badhusha are found. It is in the Northern side of the main dargah within 0.5 km. Kattupalli is very spacious and it accommodates millions of people who gather during the Sandanakoodu urus festival.
