= Twin Islands (Andaman Islands) =

- Location within Andaman and Nicobar Islands

Geography
- Location: Bay of Bengal
- Coordinates: 11.395°N 92.555°E
- Archipelago: Andaman Islands
- Adjacent to: Indian Ocean
- Total islands: 2
- Major islands: West Twin; East Twin
- Area: 0.587 km^{2} (0.227 sq mi)
- Highest elevation: 48 m (157 ft)
- Highest point: West Twin

Administration
- India
- District: South Andaman
- Island group: Andaman Islands
- Island sub-group: Mahatma Gandhi
- Tehsil: Port Blair Tehsil

Demographics
- Population: 0 (2011)

Additional information
- Time zone: IST (UTC+5:30)
- PIN: 744202
- Telephone code: 031927
- ISO code: IN-AN-00
- Official website: www.and.nic.in

Twin Islands is an island of the Andaman Islands. It belongs to the South Andaman administrative district, part of the Indian union territory of Andaman and Nicobar Islands. The islands are 35 km (22 mi) south from Port Blair.

== Geography ==
The islands belongs to the Rutland Archipelago and are located west of Bada Khari. West Twin has an area of 20.5 ha (51 acres) and a coastline of 1.73 km (1 mi), East Twin has an area of 38.2 ha (94 acres) and a coastline of 2.6 km (2 mi).

== Administration ==
Politically, Twin Islands are part of Port Blair Taluk.

== Demographics ==
The islands are uninhabited.
