= Pullivasal Island =

Island in Tamil Nadu

- Interactive map of Pullivasal Island

Geography
- Coordinates: 9.20°N 79.13°E
- Area: 0.3 km^{2} (0.12 sq mi)

Administration
- India
- State: Tamil Nadu
- District: Ramanathapuram
- Taluk: Rameswaram

Pullivasal Island is an uninhabited island in the Gulf of Mannar situated south of Pamban Island. The island belongs to India and forms a part of the Gulf of Mannar Marine National Park. The area of sea grass beds along the coast is 5.89 square kilometres.
