= Perumal Par =

Indian uninhabited coral atoll

- Location within Lakshadweep

Geography
- Location: Arabian Sea
- Coordinates: 11.164°N 72.05°E
- Type: Atoll
- Archipelago: Lakshadweep
- Adjacent to: Indian Ocean
- Total islands: 3
- Major islands: North; Middle; South
- Area: 0.0172 km^{2} (0.0066 sq mi)
- Highest elevation: 0 m (0 ft)

Administration
- India
- Territory: Union territory of Lakshadweep
- District: Lakshadweep
- Island group: Aminidivi
- Tehsils of India: Aminidivi
- Subdivisions of India: Bitra

Demographics
- Population: 0 (2014)
- Pop. density: 0/km^{2} (0/sq mi)
- Ethnic groups: Malayali, Mahls

Additional information
- Time zone: IST (UTC+5:30)
- ISO code: IN-LD-01
- Official website: www.lakshadweep.gov.in
- Avg. summer temperature: 32.0 °C (89.6 °F)
- Avg. winter temperature: 28.0 °C (82.4 °F)

Perumal Par, also known as Peremul Par, is an uninhabited coral atoll belonging to the Amindivi Subgroup of islands of the Union Territory of Lakshadweep, India. It has a distance of 2,001 km (1,243 mi) south of the city of Delhi.

== Geography ==
Perumal Par is located at 11.164°N 72.05°E, 33 km south of Bitra Par and 25 km to the northwest of Bangaram Atoll.

The atoll is very similar in appearance to Cherbaniani Reef further north. It has a large lagoon devoid of islands in the encircling reef, except for 3 small sandy islets located at the eastern area. The lagoons area is 83.02 km^{2} (32.05 sq mi). the Islands of Perumal Par are:

- North Island, located at 11.2088°N 72.1041°E, with an area of 0.1 hectares (0.25 acres).
- Middle Island, located at 11.1977°N 72.0955°E, with an area of 0.64 hectares (1.6 acres).
- South Island, located at 11.15°N 72.0875°E, with an area of 0.98 hectares (2.4 acres).

== Ecology ==
Terns of different species visit this atoll. Some damage to the corals of this atoll caused by Acanthaster planci crown-of-thorns starfish was observed in the 1990s.

Its surrounding waters are a good fishing area for baitfish and the place is often visited by fishermen from inhabited islands nearby. Tourists from nearby Bangaram Island resort often make excursions to this lonely atoll.
