= Sinoy Hill =

Sinoy Hill is an island in the Mumbai harbour. In 2005, Chief Minister Vilasrao Deshmukh had inspected the location as a site for the location of a statue in honour of Shivaji, a revered Maratha emperor.
