= Napier Bay Islands =

Archipelago of the Andaman Islands

- Location within Andaman and Nicobar Islands Location within Bay of Bengal

Geography
- Location: Bay of Bengal
- Coordinates: 11.95°N 92.75°E
- Archipelago: Andaman Islands
- Adjacent to: Indian Ocean
- Total islands: >1
- Major islands: Kyd
- Area: 6.63 km^{2} (2.56 sq mi)
- Highest elevation: 237 m (778 ft)

Administration
- India
- District: South Andaman
- Island group: Andaman Islands
- Island sub-group: Great Andaman
- Tehsil: Ferrargunj Tehsil

Demographics
- Population: 0 (2016)
- Pop. density: 0.00/km^{2} (0/sq mi)
- Ethnic groups: Hindu, Andamanese

Additional information
- Time zone: IST (UTC+5:30)
- PIN: 744206
- Telephone code: 031927
- ISO code: IN-AN-00
- Official website: www.and.nic.in
- Literacy: 84.4%
- Avg. summer temperature: 30.2 °C (86.4 °F)
- Avg. winter temperature: 23.0 °C (73.4 °F)
- Sex ratio: 1.2♂/♀
- Census Code: 35.639.0004
- Official Languages: Hindi, English

Napier Bay Islands is a group of islands of the Andaman Islands. It belongs to the South Andaman administrative district, part of the Indian union territory of Andaman and Nicobar Islands. The islands are 30 km (19 mi) north of Port Blair.

== Geography ==
The islands are situated north of Shoal Bay. The northern islands of this group form part of a natural harbour called Port Meadow.
