= Spike Island (Andaman Islands) =

- Location within Andaman and Nicobar Islands

Geography
- Location: Bay of Bengal
- Coordinates: 12.27°N 92.71°E
- Archipelago: Andaman Islands
- Adjacent to: Indian Ocean
- Area: 9.763 km^{2} (3.770 sq mi)
- Length: 7.3 km (4.54 mi)
- Width: 2.0 km (1.24 mi)
- Coastline: 20.18 km (12.539 mi)
- Highest elevation: 136 m (446 ft)

Administration
- India
- District: North and Middle Andaman
- Island group: Andaman Islands
- Island sub-group: West Baratang Group
- Taluk: Rangat Taluk

Demographics
- Population: 0 (2016)

Additional information
- Time zone: IST (UTC+5:30)
- PIN: 744202
- Telephone code: 031927
- ISO code: IN-AN-00
- Official website: www.and.nic.in
- Literacy: 84.4%
- Avg. summer temperature: 30.2 °C (86.4 °F)
- Avg. winter temperature: 23.0 °C (73.4 °F)
- Sex ratio: 1.2♂/♀
- Census Code: 35.639.0004
- Official Languages: Hindi, English

Spike Island is an island of the Andaman Islands. It belongs to the North and Middle Andaman administrative district, part of the Indian union territory of Andaman and Nicobar Islands. The island lies 63 km (39 mi) north from Port Blair.

== Geography ==
The island belongs to the West Baratang Group and lies north of Bluff Island.

== Administration ==
Politically, Spike Island, along neighboring Baratang Islands, is part of Rangat Taluk.

== Transportation ==
you can travel by Dinghy through Port Anson from Mayabunder, on demand.

== Demographics ==
The island was previously inhabited.
