= Aves Island (Andaman Islands) =

Island of the Andaman Islands

- Location within Andaman and Nicobar Islands

Geography
- Location: Bay of Bengal
- Coordinates: 12.915°N 92.935°E
- Archipelago: Andaman Islands
- Adjacent to: Pacific Ocean
- Area: 0.2 km^{2} (0.077 sq mi)
- Length: 3.9 km (2.42 mi)
- Width: 1.2 km (0.75 mi)
- Coastline: 2.0 km (1.24 mi)
- Highest elevation: 63 m (207 ft)

Administration
- India
- District: North and Middle Andaman
- Island group: Andaman Islands
- Island sub-group: Stewart Sound Group
- Taluk: Diglipur Taluk

Demographics
- Population: 2 (2016)
- Pop. density: 10.00/km^{2} (25.9/sq mi)
- Ethnic groups: Hindu, Andamanese

Additional information
- Time zone: IST (UTC+5:30)
- PIN: 744202
- Telephone code: 031927
- ISO code: IN-AN-00
- Official website: www.and.nic.in
- Literacy: 84.4%
- Avg. summer temperature: 30.2 °C (86.4 °F)
- Avg. winter temperature: 23.0 °C (73.4 °F)
- Sex ratio: 1.2♂/♀
- Census Code: 35.639.0004
- Official Languages: Hindi, English

Aves Island is an island of the Andaman Islands. It belongs to the North and Middle Andaman administrative district, part of the Indian union territory of Andaman and Nicobar Islands. The island lies 140 km (87 mi) north from Port Blair.

== History ==
Aves Lighthouse, was established in 2008.

== Geography ==
The island belongs to the Stewart Sound Group and lies 3.5 km (2 mi) east of Mayabunder. The island is small, having an area of 0.2 km^{2} (0.077 sq mi).

== Administration ==
Politically, Aves Island is part of Mayabunder Taluk. The island is privately owned by the Co-op Society Ltd. plantation.

== Transportation ==
Aves Island is about 20 mins ride away by Dinghy from Mayabunder jetty.

== Demographics ==
There is only 1 village. According to the 2011 census of India, the Island has 1 household. The effective literacy rate (i.e. the literacy rate of population excluding children aged 6 and below) is 100%.

Demographics (2011 Census)
	Total	Male	Female
Population	2	2	0

The residents are farmers growing Paddy, vegetables, coconuts, horticultural crops, spices.
