= Cherbaniani Reef =

Coral atoll in the Amindivi Subgroup of islands of India

Cherbaniani Atoll
- Location within India

Geography
- Location: Arabian Sea
- Coordinates: 12°18′N 71°53′E
- Type: Atoll
- Archipelago: Lakshadweep
- Adjacent to: Indian Ocean
- Total islands: 3
- Major islands: North; South; Middle
- Area: 0.015 km^{2} (0.0058 sq mi)
- Highest elevation: 2 m (7 ft)

Administration
- India
- Territory: Union territory of Lakshadweep
- District: Lakshadweep
- Island group: Aminidivi
- Tehsils of India: Aminidivi
- Subdivisions of India: Bitra

Demographics
- Population: 0 (2014)
- Pop. density: 0/km^{2} (0/sq mi)
- Ethnic groups: Malayali, Mahls

Additional information
- Time zone: IST (UTC+5:30)
- ISO code: IN-LD-01
- Official website: www.lakshadweep.gov.in
- Avg. summer temperature: 32.0 °C (89.6 °F)
- Avg. winter temperature: 28.0 °C (82.4 °F)

Cherbaniani Reef, also known as Beleapani Reef (Malayalam: Valiyapanniyam), is a coral atoll belonging to the Amindivi Subgroup of islands of the Union Territory of Lakshadweep, India. It has a distance of 1,880 km (1,170 mi) south of the city of Delhi.

== Geography ==
Cherbaniani Reef is located 33 km north of Byramgore Reef and at 12°18′N 71°53′E it is the northwesternmost feature of Lakshadweep. The atoll has a roughly oval shape and was first described by ornithologist Allan Hume in 1876; its total lagoon area is 57.46 km^{2} (22.19 sq mi). The 14 km long coral reef that encloses the lagoon has three small uninhabited islands on it.

== Ecology ==
They are composed of accumulated coral sand, shingle, cuttle-bones and sea shells. There are many land hermit crabs under the boulders and among the detritus. The atoll used to be a breeding ground for pelagic birds, including the sooty tern (Sterna fuliginosa) and brown noddy (Anous stolidus), which were formerly found in great numbers.

== Demographics ==
North Islet has a small mosque built and maintained by local fishermen from Bitra, Chetlat, Kiltan and Agatti islands. The fishermen came here and camp for fishing in a seasonal manner during the period between both monsoons.

== Economics ==
Lakshadweep islanders from Chetlat and Bitra sometimes visit the islands to collect guano for the gardens of the inhabited islands, gathering eggs, dumping garbage and disturbing the nestlings of pelagic birds in the process. The beaches are strewn with marine litter composed mainly of oceanic flotsam deposited by currents, such as plastic bottles, glass bulbs, polystyrene foam and cans.

== Administration ==
The Atoll belongs to the township of Bitra of Aminidivi Tehsil.

== Image gallery ==
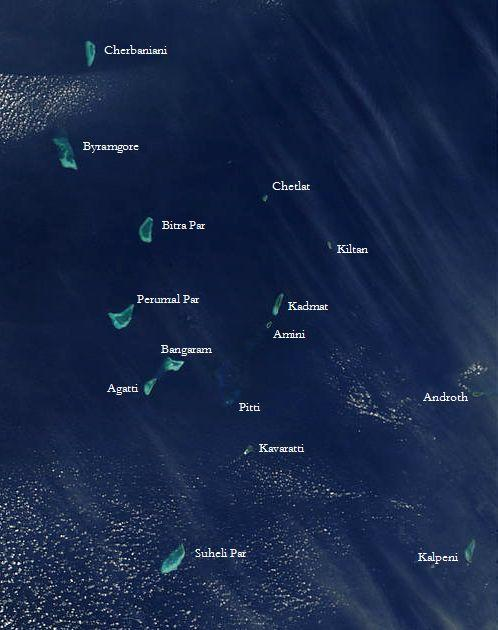
Satellite picture showing the atolls of the Lakshadweep except for Minicoy.

Map of Lakshadweep Islands.
