= Lohachara Island =

Islet in West Bengal, India

Coordinates: 21.90°N 88.11°E

- Location within West Bengal Location within India

Geography
- Location: Bay of Bengal
- Archipelago: Sundarbans

Administration
- India
- State: West Bengal
- District: South 24 Parganas

Demographics
- Population: none

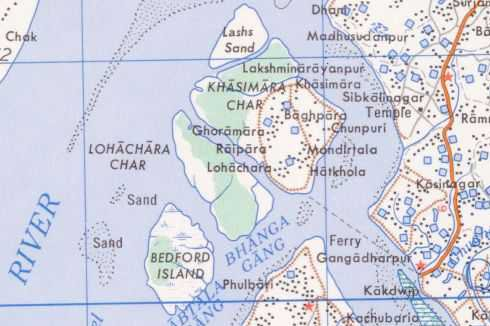
1954 map showing Lohachara Char (Hindi for Island) in Hoogly River

Lohachara Island was an islet in the Hooghly River's Sundarban delta that eroded away. It was part of the Sundarban National Park in the Indian state of West Bengal. The disappearance of the island was reported by Indian researchers in December 2006, which led to international press coverage. No specific study was ever done to prove that the island was permanently inundated (and not eroded away) because of sea level rise. In April 2009 local newspapers announced that Lochara Island had risen from the water again.

== Overview ==
The islet is one of a number of "vanishing islands" in the delta: in the past two decades, four islands – Bedford (or Suparibhanga), Lohachara, South Talpatti Island (disputed island between Bangladesh and India), and Kabasgadi – have been permanently flooded. Of them, only Lohachara was an inhabited island where more than 6,000 people used to live. The loss of land has displaced thousands of people who were forced to move to the mainland.

There are multiple causes of the disappearances of islands in the delta, including sea level rise, coastal erosion, cyclones (while the number of cyclones has decreased, their intensity has increased), mangrove destruction and coastal flooding.

In 1974 the Farakka Barrage began diverting water into the Hoogly River during its dry season. During each monsoon season almost all the Bengali delta is submerged, much of it for half a year. The sediment of the lower delta plain is primarily advected inland by monsoonal coastal setup and cyclonic events. One of the greatest challenges people living on the Ganges Delta may face in coming years is the threat of rising sea waters caused by subsidence (sinking) in the region. Residents have to be careful building on the river delta, as severe flooding sometimes occurs.

A 1990 study noted "There is no evidence that environmental degradation in the Himalayas or a 'greenhouse'-induced rise in sea level have aggravated floods in Bangladesh." The Bengal Basin is slowly tilting towards the east due to neo-tectonic movement. As a result, the salinity of Bangladesh Sunderbans is much lower than that of the Indian Sunderbans.

Overall population of the Sundarbans has risen 200% to nearly 4.3 million.

== See also ==
- South Talpatti Island
- Ganges Delta
