= Kattupalli Island =

Island on the southern periphery of the Pulicat Lake

Kattupalli Island, also referred to sometimes as the Ennore Island is an island on the southern periphery of the Pulicat Lake and separated from the mainland by backwaters. The Kattupalli Shipyard is located on the island. The island is covered by scrub jungle and has some casuarina and coconut plantations. Many varieties of animals and birds are found here. The island is 25 kilometres (16 mi) north of Fort St. George and 5 kilometres (3.1 mi) from Ennore.
