= Byramgore Reef =

Cheriyapani
- Location within India

Geography
- Location: Arabian Sea
- Coordinates: 11°54′N 71°49′E
- Type: Atoll
- Archipelago: Lakshadweep
- Adjacent to: Indian Ocean
- Total islands: 1
- Major islands: south 11.8279°N 71.8392°E; middle
- Area: 0.1 ha (0.25 acres)
- Length: 21.5 km (13.36 mi)
- Width: 6.3 km (3.91 mi)
- Highest elevation: 2 m (7 ft)

Administration
- India
- Territory: Union territory of Lakshadweep
- District: Lakshadweep
- Island group: Aminidivi
- Tehsils of India: Aminidivi
- Subdivisions of India: Bitra

Demographics
- Population: 0 (2014)
- Pop. density: 0/km^{2} (0/sq mi)
- Ethnic groups: Malayali, Mahls

Additional information
- Time zone: IST (UTC+5:30)
- ISO code: IN-LD-01
- Official website: www.lakshadweep.gov.in
- Avg. summer temperature: 32.0 °C (89.6 °F)
- Avg. winter temperature: 28.0 °C (82.4 °F)

Byramgore Reef, also known as Chereapani Reef (Malayalam: Cheriyapanniyam), is a coral atoll belonging to the Amindivi Subgroup of islands of the Union Territory of Lakshadweep, India. It has a distance of 1,940 km (1,210 mi) south of the city of Delhi.

== Geography ==
Byramgore Reef is located 33 km south of Cherbaniani Reef and 41 km to the northwest of Bitrā Par, in the northwestern area of Lakshadweep at 11°54′N 71°49′E. The whole northern part of the atoll is submerged. The total length of the atoll, including the submerged part, is 21.5 km, with a maximum width of 6.3 km. The lagoon area is 172.59 km^{2} (66.64 sq mi).

== Ecology ==
There are a few sandbanks on the reefs, but little land is above the surface at high tide. The atoll is visited by pelagic birds, including the lesser crested tern (Sterna bengalensis) and greater crested tern (Sterna bergii).

== Administration ==
The bank belongs to the township of Bitra of Aminidivi Tehsil.

== Image gallery ==
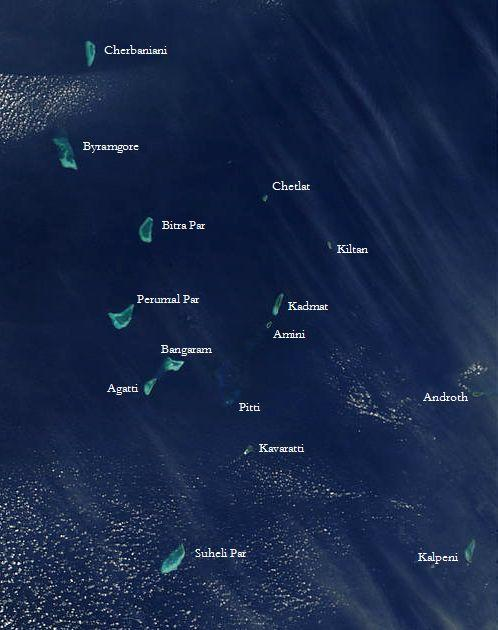
Satellite picture showing the atolls of the Lakshadweep except for Minicoy

Map
