= Curlew Island (Andaman Islands) =

Island of the Andaman Islands

- Location within Andaman and Nicobar Islands

Geography
- Location: Bay of Bengal
- Coordinates: 13.003°N 92.912°E
- Archipelago: Andaman Islands
- Adjacent to: Indian Ocean
- Area: 0.043 km^{2} (0.017 sq mi)
- Length: 0.31 km (0.193 mi)
- Width: 0.12 km (0.075 mi)
- Coastline: 0.80 km (0.497 mi)
- Highest elevation: 0 m (0 ft)

Administration
- India
- District: North and Middle Andaman
- Island group: Andaman Islands
- Island sub-group: Stewart Sound Group
- Taluk: Diglipur Taluk

Demographics
- Population: 0 (2016)
- Ethnic groups: Hindu, Andamanese

Additional information
- Time zone: IST (UTC+5:30)
- PIN: 744202
- Area code: 031927
- ISO code: IN-AN-00
- Official website: www.and.nic.in
- Literacy: 84.4%
- Avg. summer temperature: 30.2 °C (86.4 °F)
- Avg. winter temperature: 23.0 °C (73.4 °F)
- Sex ratio: 1.2♂/♀
- Census Code: 35.639.0004
- Official Languages: Hindi, English

Curlew Island is an island of the Andaman Islands. It belongs to the North and Middle Andaman administrative district, part of the Indian union territory of Andaman and Nicobar Islands. The island lies 150 km (93 mi) north of Port Blair.

== History ==
Curlew Island had a wildlife station to monitor birds, with permanent inhabitants. The station was evacuated at the end of 2015 due to budget discontinued. The island is now uninhabited.

== Geography ==
The island belongs to the Stewart Sound Group.

== Administration ==
Politically, Curlew Island, along neighboring Stewart Sound Group, is part of Diglipur Taluk. The village was located on the northern tip of the islet.

== Demographics ==
The island is now uninhabited. According to the 2011 census of India, the Island had 2 households. The effective literacy rate (i.e. the literacy rate of population excluding children aged 6 and below) is 50%.

Demographics (2011 Census)
	Total	Male	Female
Population	2	2	0
Children aged below 6 years	0	0	0
Scheduled caste	0	0	0
Scheduled tribe	2	2	0
Literates	1	1	0
Workers (all)	2	2	0
Main workers (total)	2	2	0
