= Bitra =

Coral atoll in India

- Location within India

Geography
- Location: Arabian Sea
- Coordinates: 11°33′N 72°09′E
- Type: coral atoll
- Archipelago: Lakshadweep
- Adjacent to: Indian Ocean
- Total islands: 2
- Major islands: Bitra; South Cay
- Area: 0.187 km^{2} (0.072 sq mi)
- Highest elevation: 2 m (7 ft)

Administration
- India
- Territory: Union territory of Lakshadweep
- District: Lakshadweep
- Island group: Aminidivi
- Tehsils of India: Aminidivi
- Subdivisions of India: Bitra

Demographics
- Population: 278 (2016)
- Pop. density: 1,570/km^{2} (4070/sq mi)
- Ethnic groups: Malayali, Mahls

Additional information
- Time zone: IST (UTC+5:30)
- PIN: 682555
- Telephone code: 04890
- ISO code: IN-LD-07
- Official website: lakshadweep.nic.in/island_web/Bitra/index.htm
- Literacy: 84.4%
- Avg. summer temperature: 32.0 °C (89.6 °F)
- Avg. winter temperature: 28.0 °C (82.4 °F)
- Sex ratio: 57%♂/♀

Bitra, also known as Bitrā Par, is a coral atoll belonging to the Amindivi Subgroup of islands of the Union Territory of Lakshadweep in India. It is 483 km (300 mi) west of the city of Kochi.

== History ==
Prior to the 20th century, islanders from Kiltan and Chetlat visited the island to collect the eggs of pelagic birds breeding there. Until 1945, when a woman from Chetlat made this island her home, there were no attempts to settle this island permanently. There is a small shrine dedicated to an old Arab saint by the name of Malik Mulla who was buried on the island. The shrine has become a pilgrimage site.

== Geography ==
The atoll of Bitra encompasses two islands. The main Bitra Island 0.177 km^{2} (0.068 sq mi) is located at the northern end of the Bitrā Par coral reef 11.598°N 72.187°E. The small south cay 0.009 km^{2} (0.0035 sq mi)is located on the southern part of the coral reef 11.524°N 72.176°E. Bitra is the smallest of the populated islands of Lakshadweep. It is located 33 km to the north of Perumal Par and 41 km to the southeast of Byramgore Reef. The Bitra Par lagoon area is 54.61 km^{2} (21.09 sq mi).

== Population ==
The 2011 census determined that 271 people made this island their home, making it the least populated among the inhabited islands in Lakshadweep.

== Administration ==
The atoll belongs to the township of Bitra of Aminidivi Tehsil.

== Transportation ==
The main island has a small jetty on the south shore and a helipad on the westpoint.

== Economics ==
The inhabitants on the island are engaged in very small scale farming and fishing which are mainly for the island's consumption.

== Image gallery ==
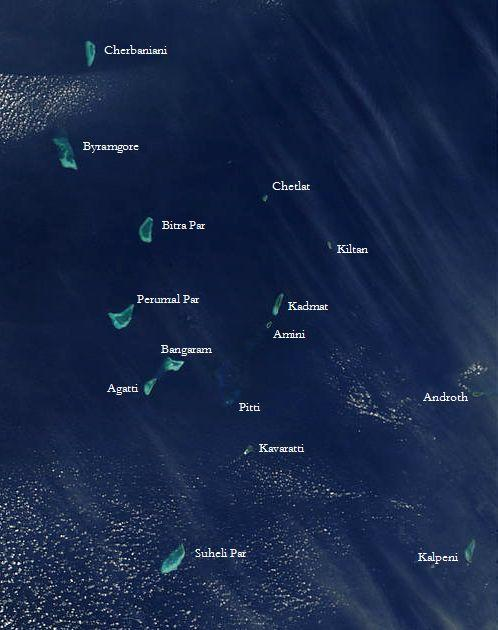
Satellite picture showing the atolls of the Lakshadweep except for Minicoy

Map
