= Jirkatang =

Village in South Andaman, India

Jirkatang is a small village in the South Andaman District of the Andaman and Nicobar Islands union territory in India. Jirkatang is located along the National Highway 4 (India) and has a check post. Jirkatang on Google Maps is shown as 'Jirkatang Camp No. 7'. Jirkatang, following the National Highway 4, is about 44 kilometres (27 miles) away from the capital of the Andaman and Nicobar Islands, Port Blair. A regular trip between the two places would take around 40 minutes.
