= West Baratang Group =

West Baratang Islands
- Location within Andaman and Nicobar Islands

Geography
- Location: Bay of Bengal
- Coordinates: 12.20°N 92.74°E
- Archipelago: Andaman Islands
- Adjacent to: Indian Ocean
- Total islands: 20
- Major islands: Belle; Spike; Bluff; Boning
- Area: 40.05 km^{2} (15.46 sq mi)
- Highest elevation: 136 m (446 ft)

Administration
- India
- District: North and Middle Andaman
- Island group: Andaman Islands
- Island sub-group: Great Andaman
- Taluk: Rangat Taluk

Demographics
- Population: 0 (2016)

Additional information
- Time zone: IST (UTC+5:30)
- PIN: 744202
- Telephone code: 031927
- ISO code: IN-AN-00
- Official website: www.and.nic.in
- Literacy: 84.4%
- Avg. summer temperature: 30.2 °C (86.4 °F)
- Avg. winter temperature: 23.0 °C (73.4 °F)
- Sex ratio: 1.2♂/♀
- Census Code: 35.639.0004
- Official Languages: Hindi, English

West Baratang Group are an island group of the Andaman Islands, located west of Baratang Island.

== Administration ==
Politically, the Baratang Islands, are part of Rangat Taluk. The islands are also known as Port Anson Islands.

== Fauna ==
Parrot island is a famous tourist spot. It is a small uninhabited island located near Baratang Jetty. What makes it attractive for tourists is the mystery that this island holds which calls thousands of parrots every evening.
