= Stewart Sound Group =

- Location within Andaman and Nicobar Islands

Geography
- Location: Bay of Bengal
- Coordinates: 12.97°N 92.93°E
- Archipelago: Andaman Islands
- Adjacent to: Indian Ocean
- Total islands: 20
- Major islands: Aves; Stewart; Sound
- Area: 24.88 km^{2} (9.61 sq mi)
- Highest elevation: 147 m (482 ft)

Administration
- India
- District: North and Middle Andaman
- Island group: Andaman Islands
- Island sub-group: Stewart Sound Group
- Taluk: multiple
- Largest settlement: Aves Island

Demographics
- Population: 4 (2011)
- Pop. density: 0.16/km^{2} (0.41/sq mi)
- Ethnic groups: Hindu, Andamanese

Additional information
- Time zone: IST (UTC+5:30)
- PIN: 744202
- Telephone code: 031927
- ISO code: IN-AN-00
- Official website: www.and.nic.in
- Literacy: 84.4%
- Avg. summer temperature: 30.2 °C (86.4 °F)
- Avg. winter temperature: 23.0 °C (73.4 °F)
- Sex ratio: 1.2♂/♀
- Census Code: 35.639.0004
- Official Languages: Hindi, English

Stewart Sound Islands are a group of islands of the Andaman Islands. It belongs to the North and Middle Andaman administrative district, part of the Indian union territory of Andaman and Nicobar Islands.

== Geography ==
Important islands: Aves, Stewart, Sound (the largest and highest island, at 147 metres), Curlew, Blister, Gurjan, Dottrel, Oliver, Orchid, Egg, Gander, Oyster, Square, Swamp, Karlo, Goose.

== Demographics ==
There are 2 villages, on Stewart and Aves.
