= Ferrargunj =

Tehsil of Andaman and Nicobar Islands

Ferrargunj is one of five local administrative divisions of the Indian district of South Andaman, which is a part of the Indian union territory of Andaman and Nicobar Islands. The place was named after Michael Lloyd Ferrar, a commissioner and butterfly collector.

It is a division known locally as a tehsil, roughly equivalent to a county in its range of administrative powers. It is located in the Andaman Islands.

Ferrargunj's population according to 2011 Census of India figures was 53,565.

== Demographics ==
Bengali is the most spoken language in Ferrargunj tehsil. As of 2011 census, Bengali is spoken as the first language by 24.23 percent of the tehsil's population. Largest language's populations are

Bengali 12,981

Malayalam 9,211

Hindi 8,768

Tamil 7,634

Telugu 7,040

Sadri 3,359

Kurukh 2,416

Kharia 545

Munda 377.

Ferrarganj tehsil in 2011 census
1. Bengali (24.2%)
2. Malalyalam (17.2%)
3. Hindi (16.4%)
4. Tamil (14.2%)
5. Telugu (13.1%)
6. Sadri (6.27%)
7. Kurukh (4.51%)
8. Kharia (1.02%)
9. Munda (0.70%)
10. Others (2.13%)

== See also ==
- Administrative divisions of India
