= Murga Island =

Island of the Andaman Islands

- Location within Andaman and Nicobar Islands Location within Bay of Bengal

Geography
- Location: Bay of Bengal
- Coordinates: 12.90°N 92.79°E
- Archipelago: Andaman Islands
- Adjacent to: Indian Ocean
- Area: 3.775 km^{2} (1.458 sq mi)
- Length: 2.2 km (1.37 mi)
- Width: 2.6 km (1.62 mi)
- Coastline: 11.20 km (6.959 mi)
- Highest elevation: 0 m (0 ft)

Administration
- India
- District: North and Middle Andaman
- Island group: Andaman Islands
- Island sub-group: Interview Group
- Taluk: Mayabunder Taluk

Demographics
- Population: 0 (2011)

Additional information
- Time zone: IST (UTC+5:30)
- PIN: 744202
- Telephone code: 031927
- ISO code: IN-AN-00
- Official website: www.and.nic.in
- Literacy: 84.4%
- Avg. summer temperature: 30.2 °C (86.4 °F)
- Avg. winter temperature: 23.0 °C (73.4 °F)
- Sex ratio: 1.2♂/♀
- Census Code: 35.639.0004
- Official Languages: Hindi, English

Murga Island is an island of the Andaman Islands. It belongs to the North and Middle Andaman administrative district, part of the Indian union territory of Andaman and Nicobar Islands. The island lies 117 km (73 mi) north from Port Blair.

== History ==
Murga is the only historical island of the Interview group. It holds a gravesite for several British sailors.

== Geography ==
The island belongs to the Interview Group and is situated to the west of Austen Strait which separates North Andaman Island and Middle Andaman Island. it is the biggest island in Interview Sound.

== Administration ==
Politically, Murga Island, along neighboring Interview Group Islands, is part of Mayabunder Taluk.
