= South Reef Island =

Island in Indian Ocean

- Location within Andaman and Nicobar Islands

Geography
- Location: Bay of Bengal
- Coordinates: 12.771°N 92.655°E
- Archipelago: Andaman Islands
- Adjacent to: Indian Ocean
- Area: 0.077 km^{2} (0.030 sq mi)
- Length: 0.7 km (0.43 mi)
- Width: 0.14 km (0.087 mi)
- Coastline: 1.8 km (1.12 mi)
- Highest elevation: 7 m (23 ft)

Administration
- India
- District: North and Middle Andaman
- Island group: Andaman Islands
- Island sub-group: Interview Group
- Taluk: Mayabunder Taluk

Demographics
- Population: 0 (2011)
- Pop. density: 0/km^{2} (0/sq mi)
- Ethnic groups: Hindu, Andamanese

Additional information
- Time zone: IST (UTC+5:30)
- PIN: 744202
- Telephone code: 031927
- ISO code: IN-AN-00
- Official website: www.and.nic.in
- Literacy: 84.4%
- Avg. summer temperature: 30.2 °C (86.4 °F)
- Avg. winter temperature: 23.0 °C (73.4 °F)
- Sex ratio: 1.2♂/♀
- Census Code: 35.639.0004
- Official Languages: Hindi, English

South Reef Island is an island of the Andaman Islands in the Bay of Bengal, Indian Ocean. It belongs to the North and Middle Andaman administrative district, part of the Indian union territory of Andaman and Nicobar Islands. The island lies 117 km (73 mi) north from Port Blair.

== Geography ==
The island belongs to the Interview Group and is situated to the west of Austen Strait which separates North Andaman Island and Middle Andaman Island. The island is low and with a rectangular shape.

== Administration ==
Politically, South Reef Island, along neighboring Interview Group Islands, is part of Mayabunder Taluk.
