= Rangat =

- Village
- Location in Andaman and Nicobar Islands, India Rangat (India)
- Coordinates: 12°30′11″N 92°54′48″E
- Country: India
- Union Territory: Andaman and Nicobar Islands
- District: Andaman

Population (2001 census)
  - Total: 38,824

Languages
  - Official: Hindi, English
- Time zone: UTC+5:30 (IST)
- PIN: 744205
- Telephone code: 03192
- Nearest city: Port Blair
- Climate: Am
- Website: and.nic.in

Rangat is a town on the Middle Andaman Island, Andaman Archipelago. It is also one of the three counties (tehsils) administrative divisions of the North and Middle Andaman district, in the Andaman and Nicobar Islands union territory of India. Its population, according to the 2001 Census of India, was 38,824 people, mainly of Bengalis and Tamils.

Rangat is 210 km from Port Blair and 70 km south of Mayabunder. The town is well connected by road and sea routes.

== People ==
=== Villages ===
As of July 2012, Rangat county included the following villages (panchayats):

- Rangat proper
- Bakultala
- Dashratpur
- Kadamtala
- Kausalyanagar
- Long Island
- Nilambur
- Nimbutala
- Parnasala
- Sabri
- Shivapuram
- Sunderghar
- Urmilapur
- Uttara

=== Demographics ===
Bengali is the most spoken language in Rangat tehsil. As of 2011 census, Bengali is spoken as the first language by 40.97 per cent of the tehsil's population. Largest language's population are:

- Bengali 15,007
- Sadri 4,707
- Hindi 2,221
- Telugu 3,271
- Kurukh 3,215
- Tamil 3,237
- Malayalam 1,824
- Kharia 1,043
- Munda 982
Rangat tehsil in 2011 census
1. Bengali (41.0%)
2. Sadri (12.8%)
3. Telugu (8.93%)
4. Tamil (8.84%)
5. Kurukh (8.78%)
6. Hindi (6.06%)
7. Malalyalam (4.98%)
8. Kharia (2.85%)
9. Munda (2.68%)
10. others (3.06%)

== Education ==
Centrally funded Jawahar Navodaya Vidyalaya, Middle Andaman for North and Middle Andaman district is located in Rangat taluk. Navodaya vidyalaya is well connected via National Highway 4 which lies just 1.5 km away.

== Tourism ==
The tourism landscape in Rangat has evolved from a transit stopover to a curated center of eco-tourism and conservation. It no longer looks like the 2011's "ramshackle sprawl around two rows of chai shops and general stores divided by the ATR Andaman Trunk Road."

- Beaches: To accommodate a rising volume of international and domestic eco-travelers, local authorities have established eco-friendly picnic facilities, waste-wood seating structures, and dedicated viewing points at Amkunj Beach (8 km away) at Dhani Nallah located at outskirts of Rangat, Cutbert Bay Beach (18 km away), and Moricedera Beach.
- Dhani Nallah Mangrove walk: The island's signature attraction is the Dhani Nallah Mangrove Walkway, India's longest wooden boardwalk, which winds through dense mangrove forest ecosystems directly to a sprawling beach.
- Wildlife tourism: Rangat functions as a vital ecological hub for wildlife tourism, with the Cuthbert Bay Wildlife Sanctuary drawing significant seasonal footfall for monitored turtle-nesting excursions, supported by a growing network of localized nature guides and specialized homestays. Cuthbert Bay is an important turtle nesting ground, especially from December to February.

== Transport ==
Rangat’s transportation infrastructure has transitioned away from its historically fragmented and outdated state due to aggressive multi-year modernization initiatives under the Andaman Public Works Department master plan.

- Bus: Ground transit is anchored by the widening and resurfacing of the Andaman Trunk Road (NH-4), which features a standardized fleet of new State Transport Service (STS) deluxe and air-conditioned buses running seamless daily schedules between Port Blair, Rangat, and Diglipur.
- Seaport: Maritime operations have been heavily augmented at the Yerrata Jetty via deep-dredged berthing facilities and modernized passenger terminal blocks that support the continuous, high-frequency transit of government vehicle ferries to Long Island and Havelock.
- Local transport: Additionally, the local administration has systematically introduced newly paved pucca link roads connecting agrarian settlements directly to the town center, eliminating traditional logistics bottlenecks.

== See also ==
- Tourism in the Andaman and Nicobar Islands
- Tourism in India
