= North Reef Island (Andaman Islands) =

Island of the Andaman Islands

- Location within Andaman and Nicobar Islands

Geography
- Location: Bay of Bengal
- Coordinates: 13.08°N 92.70°E
- Archipelago: Andaman Islands
- Adjacent to: Indian Ocean
- Total islands: 1
- Major islands: North Reef
- Area: 3.7 km^{2} (1.4 sq mi)
- Length: 3.0 km (1.86 mi)
- Width: 2.8 km (1.74 mi)
- Coastline: 10.9 km (6.77 mi)
- Highest elevation: 6.1 m (20 ft)

Administration
- India
- District: North and Middle Andaman
- Island group: Andaman Islands
- Island sub-group: North Reef Group
- Taluk: Diglipur Taluk

Demographics
- Population: 0 (2016)
- Pop. density: 0/km^{2} (0/sq mi)
- Ethnic groups: Hindu, Andamanese

Additional information
- Time zone: IST (UTC+5:30)
- PIN: 744202
- Telephone code: 031927
- ISO code: IN-AN-00
- Official website: www.and.nic.in
- Avg. summer temperature: 30.2 °C (86.4 °F)
- Avg. winter temperature: 23.0 °C (73.4 °F)
- Sex ratio: 15.0♂/♀
- Census Code: 35.639.0004

North Reef Island is an island of the Andaman Islands. It belongs to the North and Middle Andaman administrative district, part of the Indian union territory of Andaman and Nicobar Islands. The island lies 156 km (97 mi) north from Port Blair.

== Geography ==
The island is in the North Reef Group of Islands, which also includes Latouche Island and Shark Island. It lies west of North Andaman.

== Administration ==
Politically, North Reef Island, along neighboring North Reef Islands, is part of Diglipur Tehsil.

== Fauna ==
North Reef Sanctuary is located on the island. It is dedicated to the nurturing of a variety of water birds.

== Transportation ==
To arrive at North Reef Island, you have to reach Interview Island. To reach Interview Island, the only way is to charter a private fishing dinghy from Mayabunder jetty. From this island, you can try reaching North Reef Island.
