= North Reef =

North Reef may refer to:

- North Reef, Solomon Islands
- North Reef, Queensland
  - North Reef Light
- North Reef, Paracel Islands
- North Reef, Spratly Islands (in the North Danger Reef)

== See also ==
- in the Spratly Islands:
  - Gaven North Reef
  - Johnson North Reef aka Collins Reef
- North Reef Island (India), one of the Andaman Islands
