= Kataidera =

Kataidera is a village in south-west part of Middle Andaman Island. It belongs to Rangat Tehsil, India. It has mangroves because it is not very far from the sea. It comprises smaller villages including Uttara, Santanu, Attarjee, and Filtala. The population comprises mainly fishermen and farmers. It lies on the Great Andaman Trunk Road. There is a Government Senior Secondary School and a private school, Vivekananda Kendriya Vidyalay. There is one primary health centre.

Mainly Bengali communities are found in the area.
