= Kadamtala, Rangat =

Coordinates: 12.3437°N 92.7798°E

Kadamtala
- Interactive map of Kadamtala
- Country: India
- Union territory: Andaman and Nicobar Islands
- District: North and Middle Andaman

Area
  - Total: 12.2 km^{2} (4.7 sq mi)

Population (2011)
  - Total: 3,008
  - Density: 247/km^{2} (639/sq mi)
- PIN: 744209

Kadamtala is a village in the southwest part of Middle Andaman Island, Andaman Archipelago.

Administratively, it belongs to the Rangat tehsil, North and Middle Andaman district, Andaman and Nicobar Islands territory of India.

Kadamtala is located about 24 km southwest of Rangat and 77 km north of Port Blair. It lies on the Great Andaman Trunk Road and has access to the sea through a winding tidal channel that opens into Homfray Strait.

== See also ==
- Kadamtala, a village in West Bengal, India
