= Interview Group =

Interview Islands
- Location within Andaman and Nicobar Islands

Geography
- Location: Bay of Bengal
- Coordinates: 12.88°N 92.70°E
- Archipelago: Andaman Islands
- Adjacent to: Indian Ocean
- Total islands: 19
- Major islands: Interview; Anderson; Murga
- Area: 128 km^{2} (49 sq mi)
- Highest elevation: 113 m (371 ft)

Administration
- India
- District: North and Middle Andaman
- Island group: Andaman Islands
- Island sub-group: Great Andaman
- Taluk: Mayabunder Taluk
- Largest settlement: Interview village

Demographics
- Population: 16 (2011)
- Pop. density: 0.125/km^{2} (0.324/sq mi)
- Ethnic groups: Hindu, Andamanese

Additional information
- Time zone: IST (UTC+5:30)
- PIN: 744202
- Telephone code: 031927
- ISO code: IN-AN-00
- Official website: www.and.nic.in
- Literacy: 84.4%
- Avg. summer temperature: 30.2 °C (86.4 °F)
- Avg. winter temperature: 23.0 °C (73.4 °F)
- Sex ratio: 1.2♂/♀
- Census Code: 35.639.0004
- Official Languages: Hindi, English

The Interview Islands is a group of islands located in Austin Harbour and Interview sound. These islands belong to the Andaman Islands. They belong to the North and Middle Andaman administrative district, part of the Indian union territory of Andaman and Nicobar Islands.

== Geography ==
The main islands are Interview Island, Anderson Island, Murga Island, Bennett Island and South Reef Island.

== Administration ==
Politically, Interview Group Islands are part of Mayabunder Taluk.

== Demographics ==
There is one village located on the eastern part of Interview Island.
