= Bamboo Island Wildlife Sanctuary =

Wildlife Sanctuary in India

- IUCN category IV (habitat/species management area)
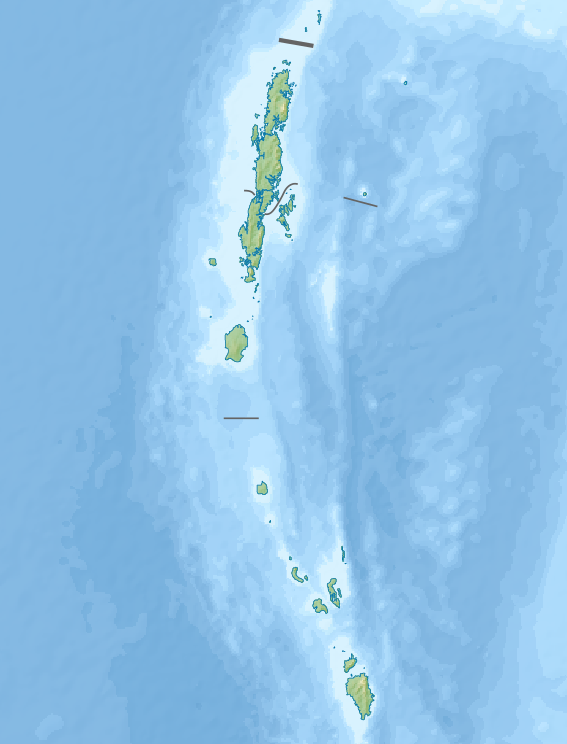
- Location within Andaman and Nicobar Islands Location within India
- Interactive map of Bamboo Island Wildlife Sanctuary
- Nearest city: Port Blair
- Coordinates: 13°03′04″N 92°55′59″E
- Area: 0.05 km^{2} (0.019 sq mi)
- Established: 1987
- Governing body: Andaman & Nicobar Forest Department

Bamboo Island Wildlife Sanctuary is a protected area located in the North and Middle Andaman District in the Indian Union territory of the Andaman and Nicobar Islands. The sanctuary was officially established in 1987 and covers an area of just 0.05 km² (~5 hectares). It forms part of a network of small island wildlife sanctuaries in the Andaman island group aimed at preserving unique coastal ecosystems, including coral reefs, littoral forests, and bamboo groves.

== Habitat and biodiversity ==
The sanctuary's habitat includes littoral bamboo and coastal vegetation, typical of small islands in the Andamans. Although detailed species lists are scarce, the broader region supports a high diversity of marine fish, sea turtles, seabirds, and occasionally visiting mammals.

== Conservation context ==
Bamboo Island is one of several small island sanctuaries declared alongside Arial, Barren, Cinque, and others in 1977–1987 to conserve sensitive coastal and marine environments. These sanctuaries contribute to India's commitment under the Aichi Biodiversity Targets, specifically Target 11, to conserve at least 10 % of coastal and marine areas.
