= Dhani Nallah =

Dhani Nallah is a nature walkway and beach on the outskirts of Rangat, Middle Andaman Island, in the Andaman Islands. It is located 20 km from Rangat adjacent to Andaman trunk road (ATR). Dhani Nallah is named after a mangrove associate locally called as Dhanipatti. The wooden boardwalk meandering through mangrove creek for a distance of 713 m is the main tourist attraction for the place.

The beach is well known for turtle nesting, including Olive ridley sea turtles.

Hawksbill Nest, Cutbert Bay, is a guest house run by the tourism department, 2 km from the entry point of Dhani Nallah walkway.

== Gallery ==
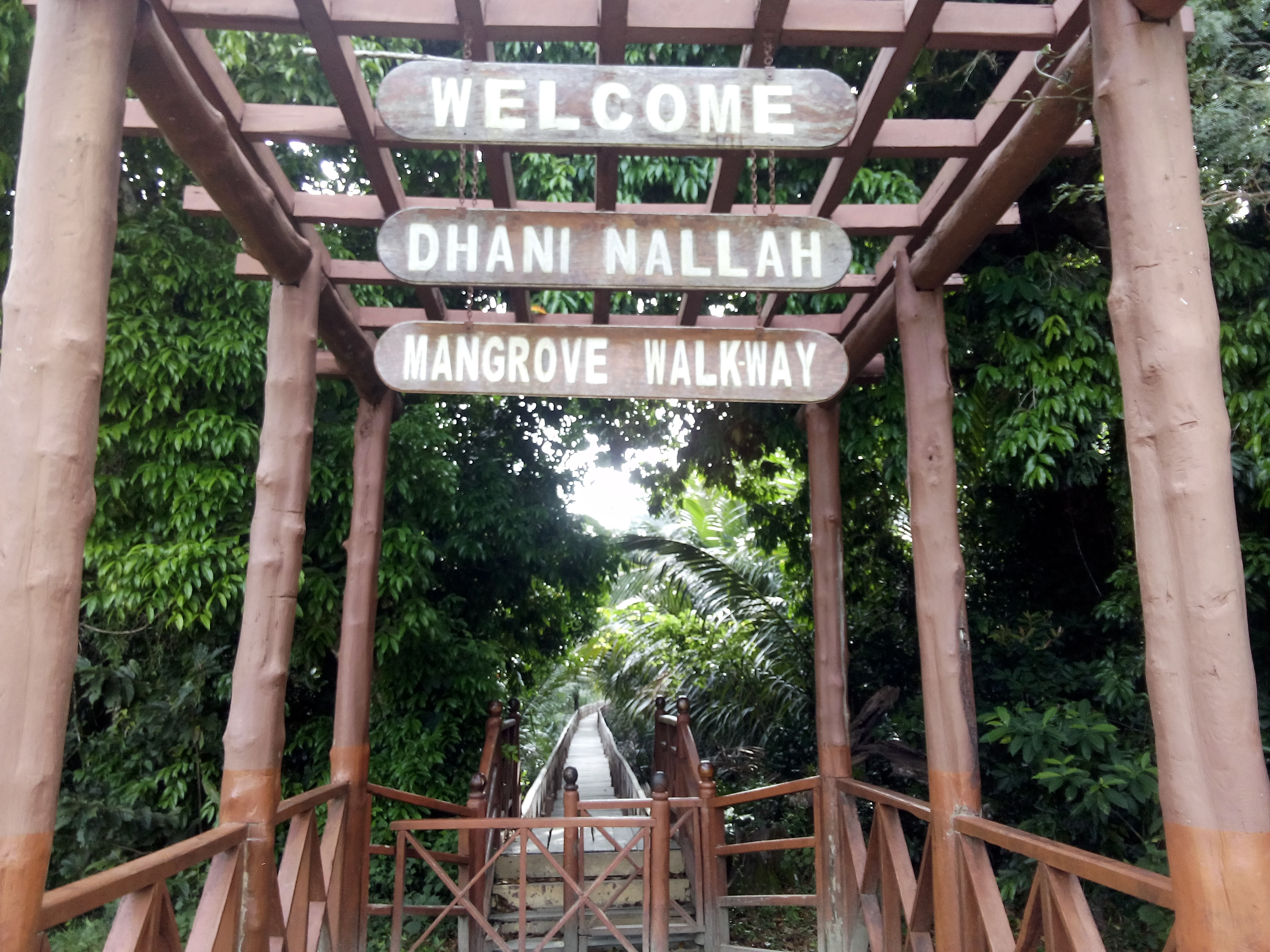
Entrance Gateway to mangrove walkway of Dhani Nallah.

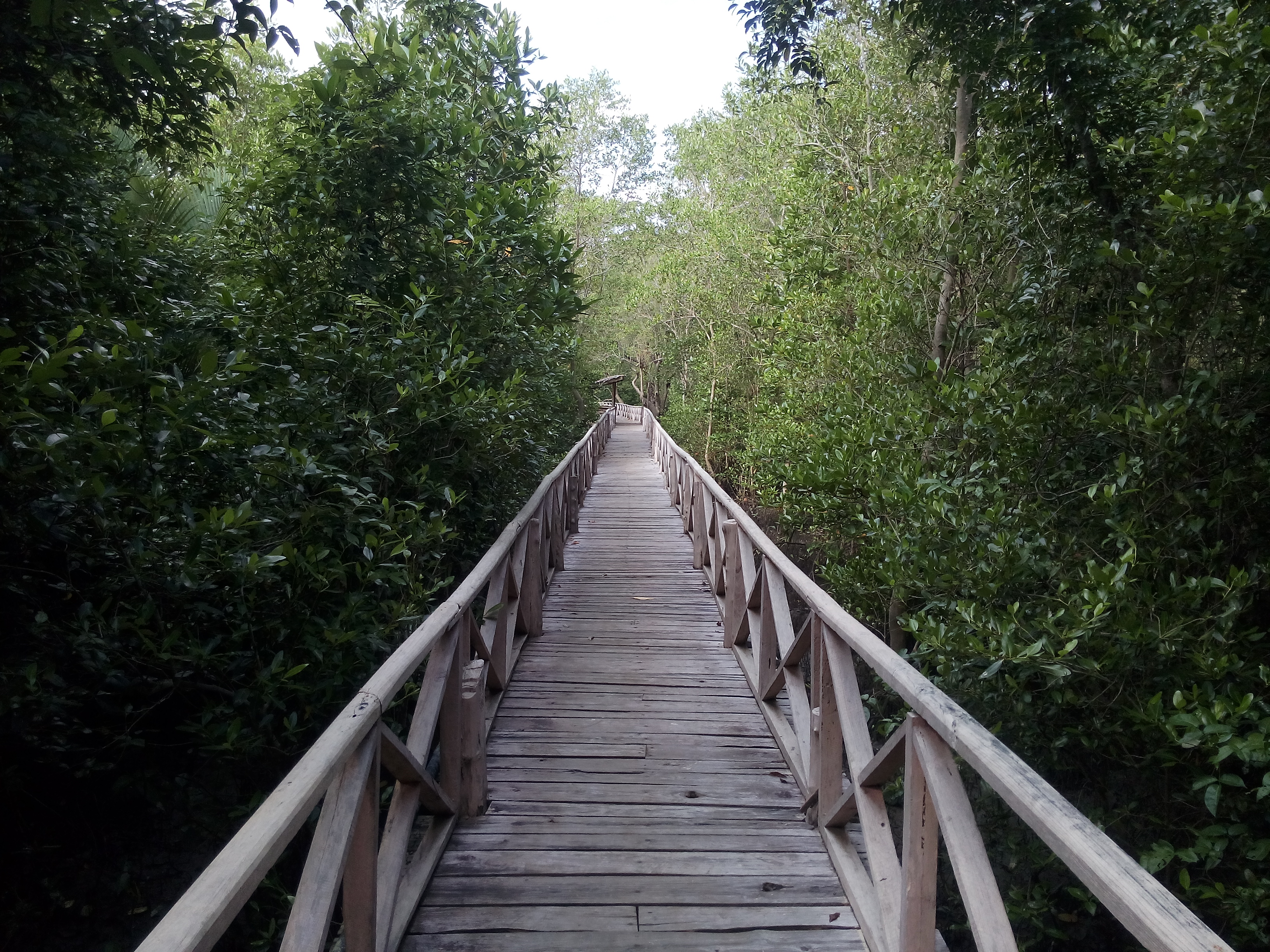
Eco-Friendly Teak Logs broadway using rejected teak logs.
