= List of districts of the Andaman and Nicobar Islands =

Districts of Andaman and Nicobar Islands
- Districts of Andaman and Nicobar Islands
- Category: Districts
- Location: Andaman and Nicobar Islands
- Number: 3 districts
- Populations: Nicobar – 36,819 (lowest); South Andaman – 237,586 (highest)
- Areas: Nicobar – 1,841 km^{2} (711 sq mi) (smallest); North and Middle Andaman –3,227 km^{2} (1,246 sq mi) (largest)
- Government: Government of India
- Subdivisions: Sub Divisions of Andaman and Nicobar Islands

The Indian Union territory of the Andaman and Nicobar Islands consists of three districts.

== Districts ==
Currently, the Union Territory of Andaman and Nicobar Islands comprises 3 districts:

Sl No	Code	Official name	Headquarters	Sub divisions	Talukas	Population	Area (in sq.km)	Density (per sq.km)	Map
1	NI	Nicobar	Malacca	3	7	36,819	1,841	20	
2	NA	North and Middle Andaman	Mayabunder	2	3	105,539	3,227	32	
3	SA	South Andaman	Sri Vijaya Puram	3	5	237,586	3,181	80	

== History ==
On 1 August 1974 Nicobar district was separated from Andaman district. On 18 August 2006, Andaman district was bifurcated into two districts: North and Middle Andaman district and South Andaman district.
