= Manglutan =

- Village
- Location on South Andaman Island in relation to Burma
- Coordinates: 11°35′N 92°39′E
- Country: India
- Territory: Andaman and Nicobar Islands
- District: Andaman District
- Time zone: UTC+5.30

Manglutan is a village in Andaman district on the south coast of South Andaman Island, belonging to India. It is located 14 miles (23 km) to the southwest of Port Blair and contains a school, hospital, and police station. The 60 acre Manglutan Rubber Plantation was established at Manglutan in 1960/61. The Dhanikari Stream flows near here.
