= Interview Island =

Island of the Andaman Islands

- Location of Interview Island

Geography
- Location: Bay of Bengal
- Coordinates: 12.88°N 92.70°E
- Archipelago: Andaman Islands
- Adjacent to: Indian Ocean
- Area: 101 km^{2} (39 sq mi)
- Length: 23 km (14.3 mi)
- Width: 6.9 km (4.29 mi)
- Coastline: 66.0 km (41.01 mi)
- Highest elevation: 113 m (371 ft)

Administration
- India
- District: North and Middle Andaman
- Island group: Andaman Islands
- Island sub-group: Interview Group
- Taluk: Mayabunder Taluk
- Largest settlement: Interview village

Demographics
- Population: 16 (2011)
- Pop. density: 0.158/km^{2} (0.409/sq mi)
- Ethnic groups: Hindu, Andamanese

Additional information
- Time zone: IST (UTC+5:30)
- PIN: 744202
- Telephone code: 031927
- ISO code: IN-AN-00
- Official website: www.and.nic.in
- Literacy: 84.4%
- Avg. summer temperature: 30.2 °C (86.4 °F)
- Avg. winter temperature: 23.0 °C (73.4 °F)
- Sex ratio: 1.2♂/♀
- Census Code: 35.639.0004
- Official Languages: Hindi, English

Interview Island is an island of the Andaman Islands. It belongs to the North and Middle Andaman administrative district, part of the Indian union territory of Andaman and Nicobar Islands. It lies 125 km (78 mi) north of Port Blair.

== History ==
The lighthouse on the island was affected by the tsunami generated by the 2004 Indian Ocean earthquake which inundated much of its area. The lighthouse was reported as "completely destroyed" at the time, but it was later repaired. Until 2015 there was a wildlife station to monitor birds, with permanent inhabitants located on the west coast near the lighthouse. The station is also staffed with a lighthouse keeper (from the police). It was evacuated at the end of 2015 due to its budget being discontinued.

== Geography ==
The island belongs to the Interview Group and is situated to the west of Austen Strait which separates North Andaman Island and Middle Andaman Island. It has an area of 101 km^{2} (39 sq mi). The island is low at its north end, but rises gradually to a height of 113 m (371 ft). The highest part of the island is a wooded plateau. A rocky pinnacle, 7 m (23 ft) high, lies close off a cliff on the south end of the island. Foul ground extends about 2 miles (3.2 km) north-northeast from the island.

== Fauna ==
The island has about 80–90 feral elephants which were brought for forestry works, and still remain on this island.. The more likely number of elephants is probably closer to a dozen or so individuals

== Administration ==
Politically, Interview Island, along with the neighbouring Interview Group of islands, is part of Mayabunder Taluk, a sub-district of India.

== Transportation ==
Travel to the island is by dinghy through Austen Strait from Mayabunder, taking 3 hours.

== Demographics ==
There is only one village, located at the eastern part of the island. According to the 2011 census of India, the island has only one household. The effective literacy rate (i.e. the literacy rate of population excluding children aged 6 and below) is 100%.

Demographics (2011 Census)
	Total	Male	Female
Population	16	15	1
Children aged below 6 years	0	0	0

The island was opened to tourists in the year 1997, it is entirely abandoned. Just a few forest wardens, policemen and coast guards are posted here in order to keep poachers at a safe distance.
