= Indispensable Reefs =

Three atolls in Rennell and Bellona Province, Solomon Islands

Coordinates: 12°40′S 160°25′E

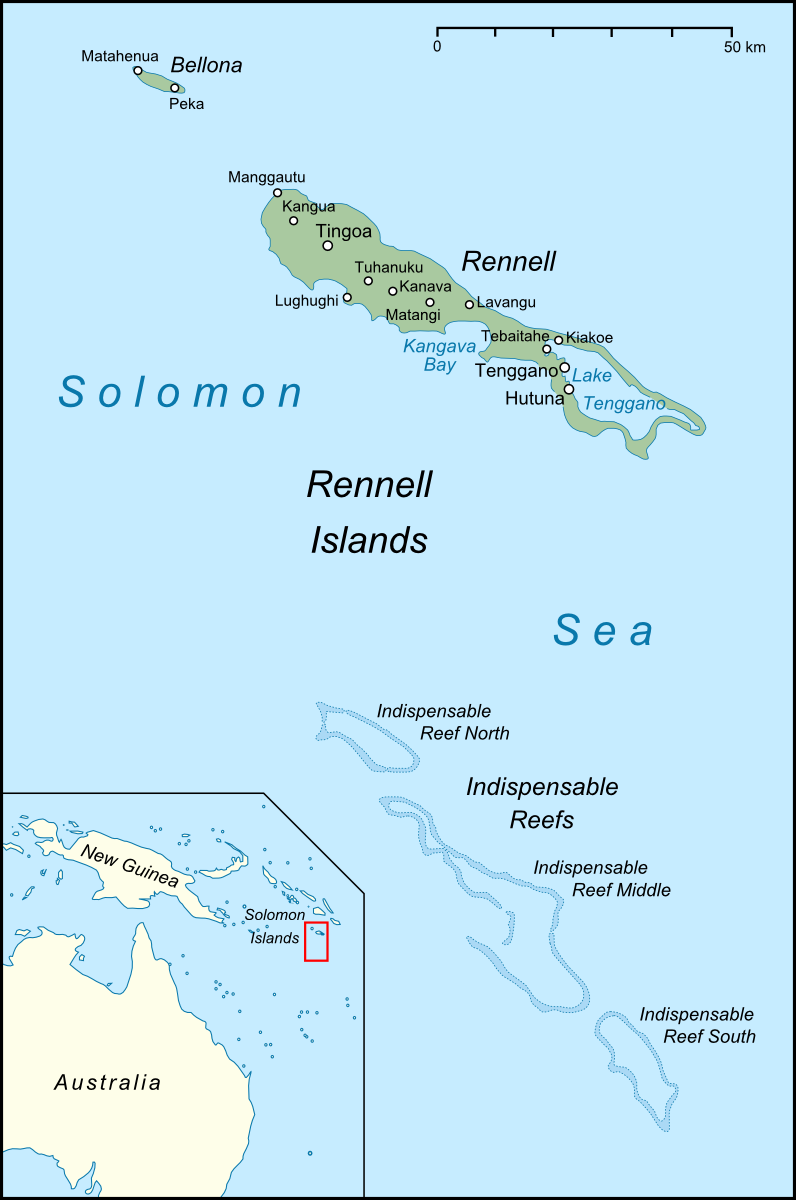
The Indispensable Reefs are located south of Rennell Island

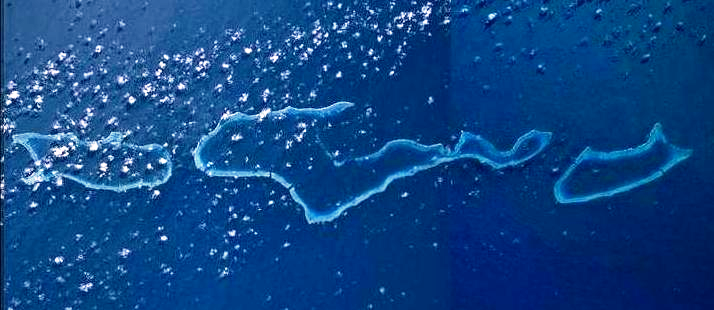
Satellite picture of the three atolls forming the Indispensable Reef, North Reef is to the right.

The Indispensable Reefs are a chain of three large coral atolls in the Coral Sea. They are located about 50 km (30 mi) south of Rennell Island. The chain stretches over a length of 114 km (71 mi) and its average width is 18 km (11 mi).

Administratively the Indispensable Reef belongs to the Rennell and Bellona Province of Solomon Islands. They are locally called "Goto'akau".

The three atolls are steep-to and each encloses a large deep lagoon. They are separated by deep passages two to three km (1.2–1.9 mi) wide. The atolls of the Indispensable Reef are aligned in a NW-SE direction:

- North Reef is 18 km (11 mi) long, and up to 7 km (4.3 mi) wide. The rim of the atoll has two narrow openings in the north and northwest. The reef has a total area of 100 km^{2} (39 sq mi), including lagoon and reef flat. There are no islets.
- Middle Reef is 51 km (32 mi) long. Little Nottingham Islet is a small islet located near the centre of the reef. Besides its main lagoon, Middle Reef has a separate smaller northern lagoon. The total area is about 300 km^{2} (120 sq mi).
- South Reef is 21 km (13 mi) long and up to 8 km (5.0 mi) wide. It encloses a lagoon 18 to 35 metres (59 to 115 ft) deep. The total area exceeds 100 km^{2} (39 sq mi).

== History ==
The ship Neptune struck Indispensable Reef on 3 August 1868, and was lost. The crew was rescued by the SS Boomerang.

During the Battle of the Coral Sea on 7 May 1942, two Japanese carrier attack planes B5N2 (EI-306 and probably EI-302) flying reconnaissance mission from the carrier Shokaku ditched on Indispensable Reef due to lack of fuel.

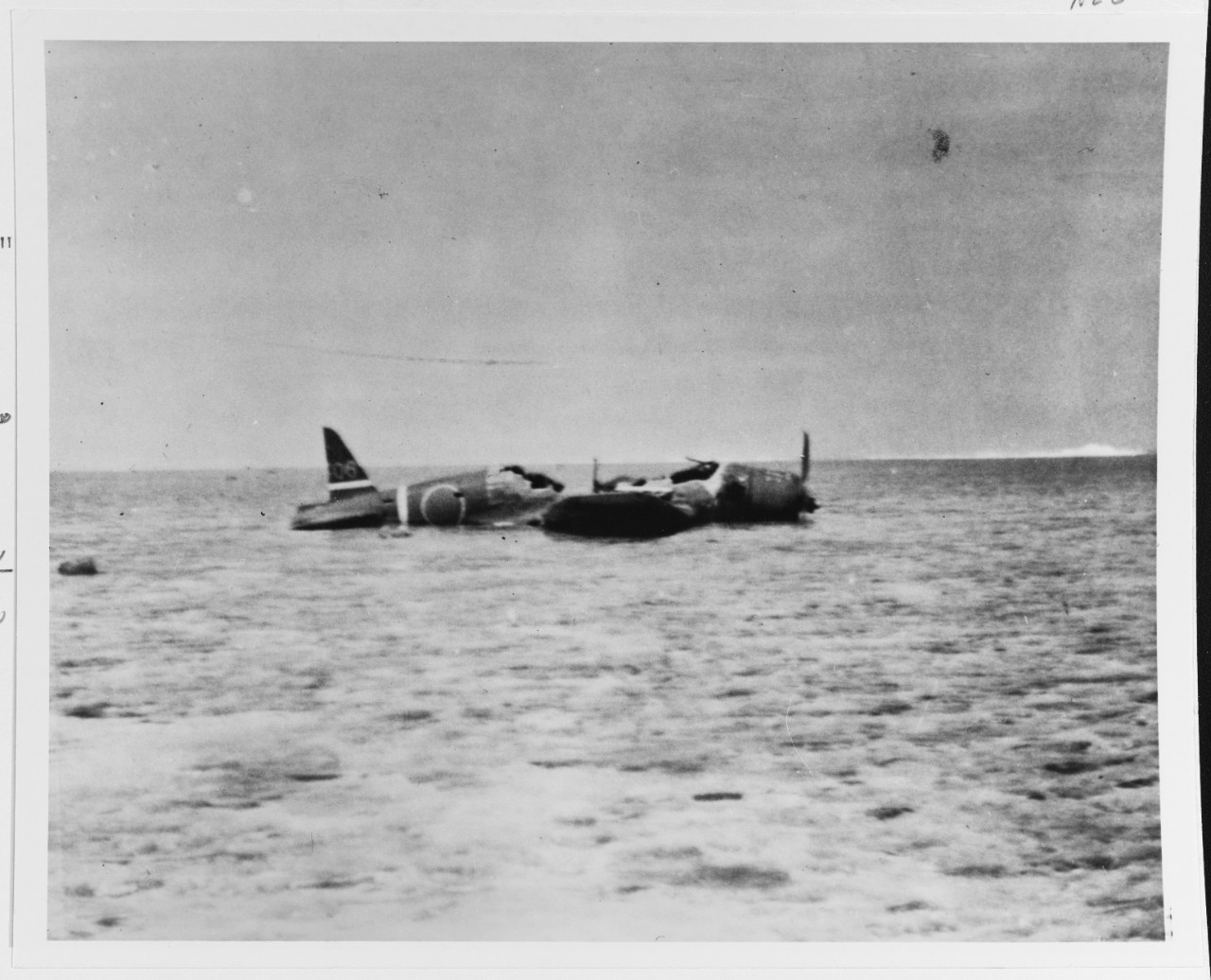
Japanese B5N torpedo bomber (aircraft number EI-306) wrecked on Indispensable Reefs

In 1983, the Solomon Islands Government apprehended a vessel from Taiwan that had been poaching the giant clam stocks around Indispensable Reef. Corals and endangered fish species are also being plundered for the aquarium trade.

== See also ==
- Desert island
- List of islands
