= Bakultala =

Bakultala is a village near Rangat. It has an Industrial Training Institution or ITI. It has mangroves because it is not very far from the sea. It comprises a number of smaller villages such as Shyamkund, Kalshi, Laxmanpur, Shaktigarh, and Kausalya Nagar.

The residents are mainly fishermen and farmers. Farmers cultivate mainly rice, vegetables, and lentils. There is a government senior secondary school and a government health sub-centre.

The area once had a wood industry.

The population is mainly Bengali, having settled decades ago.

The place can be reached by bus from the capital Port Blair in five hours.
