= North Reef, Solomon Islands =

Reef in Solomon Islands

Coordinates: 12°40′S 160°25′E

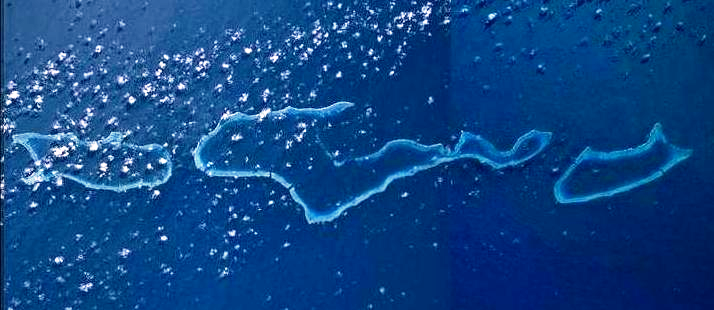
Satellite picture of the three atolls forming the Indispensable Reef, North Reef is to the right.

North Reef is a shallow reef south of Rennell Island. It is one of the three atolls that make up the Indispensable Reefs in the Rennell and Bellona Province of Solomon Islands.

The three atolls are steep-to and each encloses a large deep lagoon. They are separated by deep passages two to three kilometres wide.

North Reef covers an area 18 km long, and up to 7 km wide. The rim of the atoll has two narrow openings in the north and northwest. The reef covers a total area of 100 km², including lagoon and reef flat. There are no islets.

== See also ==
- List of islands of Solomon Islands
