= Kausalya Nagar =

Kaushalya Nagar is a village located in Rangat tehsil, Andaman district. Habitat majority possessed by Bengalis. Its pin code is 744205. The population is considered as Other Backward Class.
