= North Reef Light =

Lighthouse in Queensland, Australia

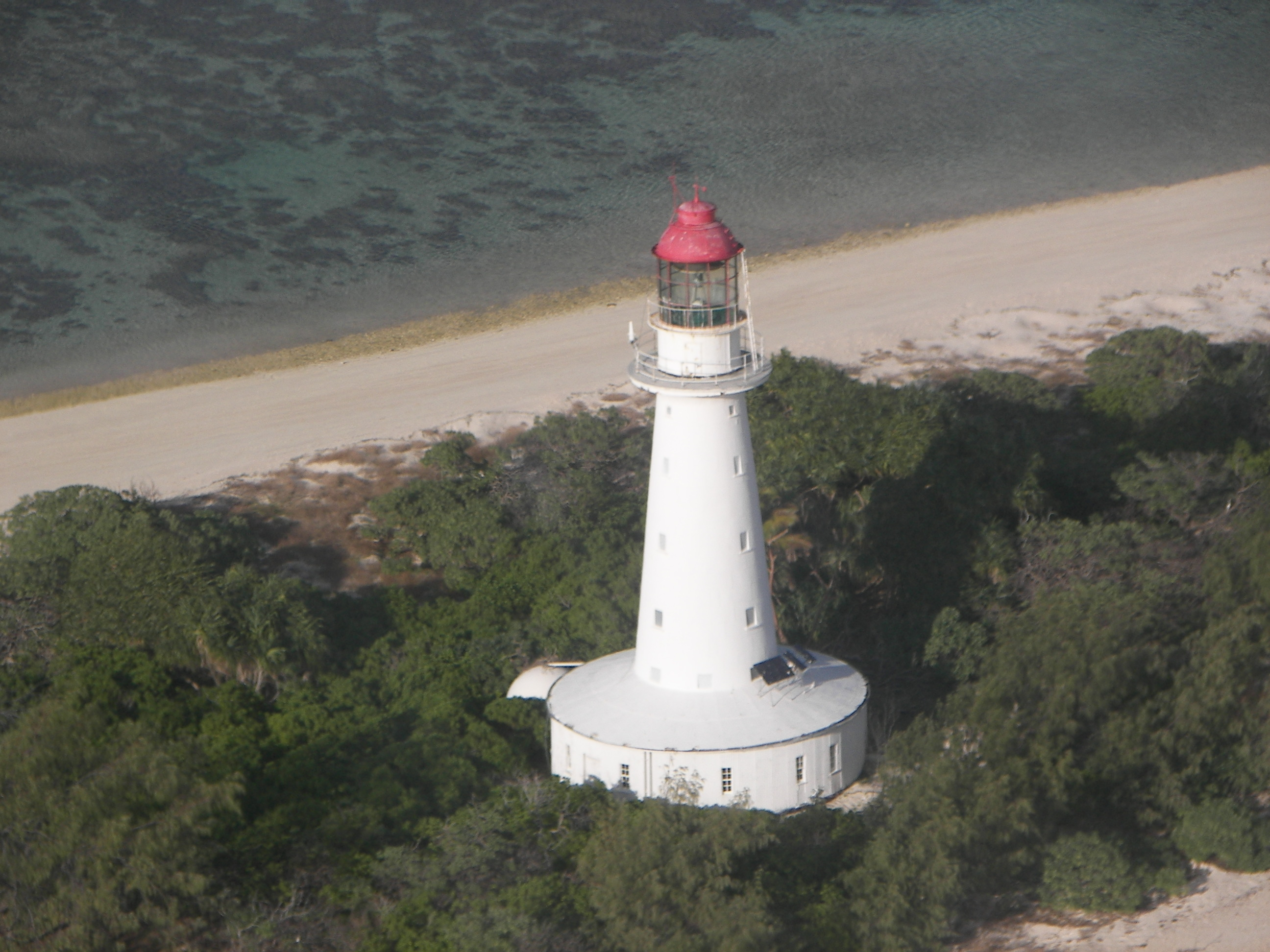
- North Reef Light from the air, 2007
- Location: North Reef; Queensland; Australia
- Coordinates: 23°11′07″S 151°54′11″E

Tower
- Constructed: 1878
- Foundation: cast concrete
- Construction: timber frame clad with galvanised wrought iron
- Height: 80 feet (24 m)
- Shape: conical tower with balcony and lantern
- Markings: white tower, red lantern dome
- Power source: solar power
- Operator: Australian Maritime Safety Authority
- Heritage: listed on the Commonwealth Heritage List
- Racon: Q

Light
- Focal height: 75 feet (23 m)
- Lens: VRB-25
- Intensity: 35,050 cd
- Range: 17 nautical miles (31 km; 20 mi)
- Characteristic: Fl (2) W 15s.

North Reef Light is an active lighthouse located on North Reef, a 5.6 square kilometres (2.2 sq mi) planar reef, about 120 kilometres (75 mi) northeast of Gladstone, Queensland, Australia in the Capricorn and Bunker Group. The lighthouse was constructed on a migratory patch of sand inside a fringing coral reef, which over the years disappeared and reappeared, as sand was washed away and accumulated, and is now a vegetated sandy island. Its construction is unique, having a hollow concrete base that both gives it resistance to the shifting nature of the sandbar and serves as a freshwater tank. As such, it is considered one of the major achievement in Australian lighthouse construction. It is also notable in that due to the harsh conditions, only bachelors were allowed to serve as lighthouse keepers. At 24 metres (79 ft) it is also the tallest of Queensland's timber-framed iron clad lighthouses.

== History ==
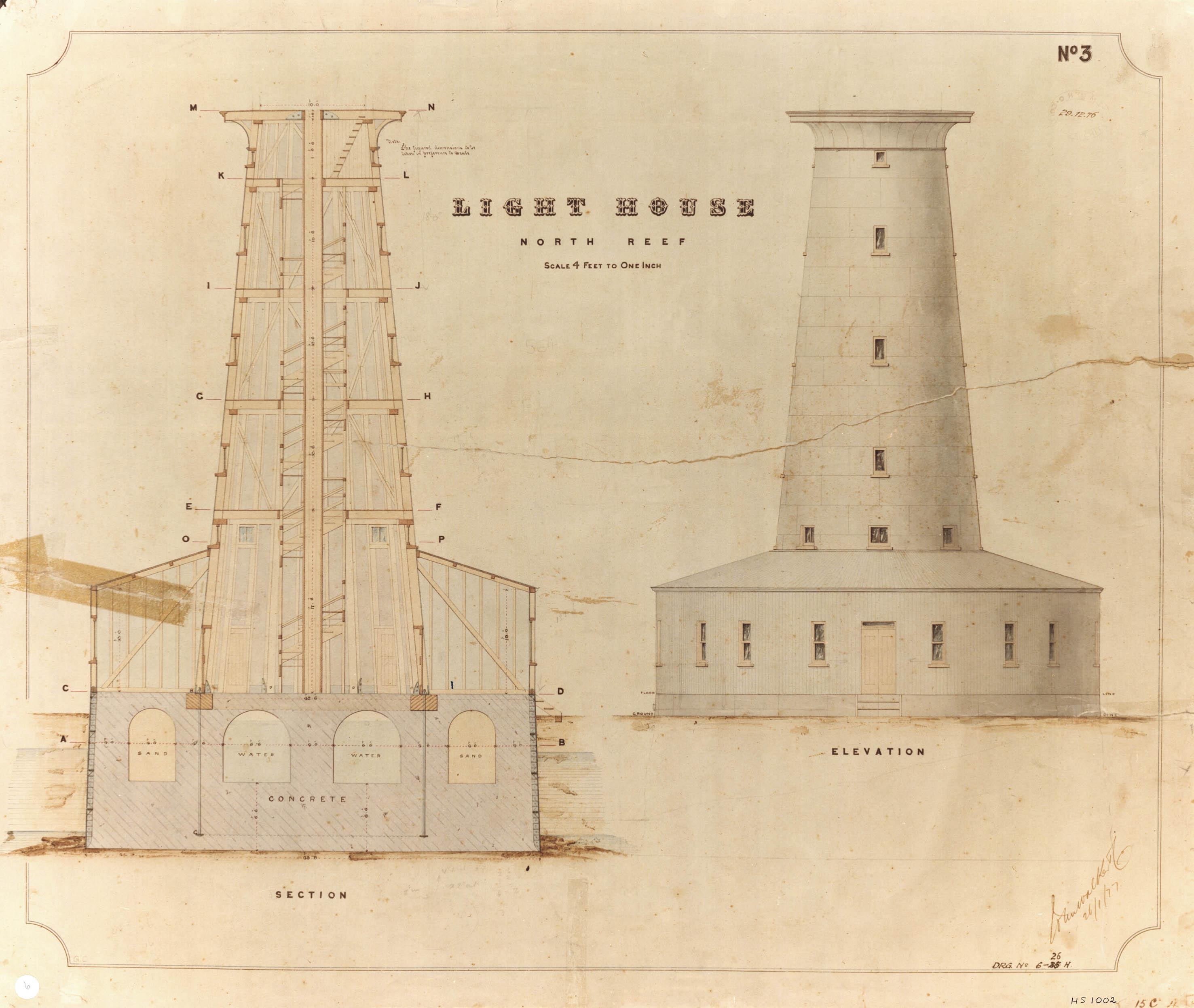
Plan of the lighthouse, 1876

The recommendation to establish a lighthouse on North Reef was made by a select parliamentary committee in 1864. The site was then a small sandbank on a coral reef. The proposal called for a cast iron cylindrical tower, 12 metres (39 ft) in diameter and 15 metres (49 ft) tall, which would rest on the coral, penetrating the sand. A hollow base would be formed by pouring concrete into the cylinder, which would also serve as a freshwater tank, and a residence surrounding it. Tenders were called in January 1876, and the winning offer was for £7,964 by Walker and Company of Maryborough. Construction was to be completed in by July 1877 but delays, first in approval of the money, and then in construction, delayed the completion until November 1878.

The base of the tower, 13 metres (43 ft) in diameter and 4.6 metres (15 ft) high, was constructed of bolted cast iron segments. Both the tower and the residence were constructed of timber frame, clad in galvanized iron. The original optical apparatus was a second order lens.

Conditions at the lighthouse were harsh. The location is remote, the quarters cramped, and the shifting sands sometimes left the lighthouse surrounded by water. The lighthouse keepers chosen were therefore single, unmarried men.

The light source was upgraded twice, in 1923 and in 1929. In 1977 the light was converted to electricity and it was demanned in January 1978. The final upgrade was on 28 September 1987 when the light was converted to solar power and six solar panels were installed on the roof of the quarters, facing north.

== Current display ==
The current light characteristic is two white flashes, separated by five seconds, every 15 seconds (Fl.(2)W. 15s), visible for 17 nautical miles (31 km; 20 mi). A racon on the tower transmits morse code "Q" (– – • –). The apparatus is a VRB-25, rotating at 2 rpm, and the light source is a 12 Volt 35 Watt Halogen lamp with an intensity of 35,050 cd.

== Structure ==
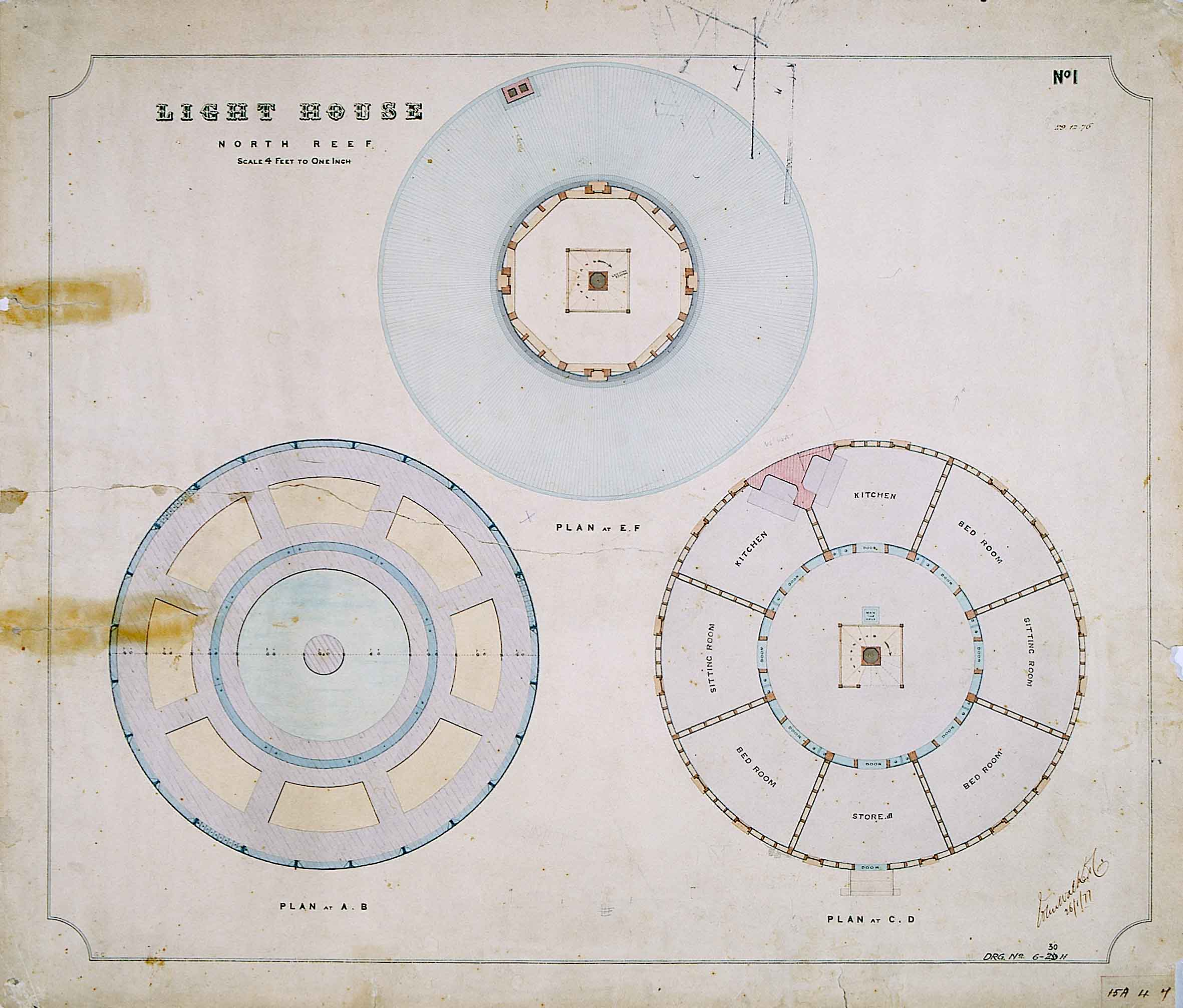
floor plans, note the plan of the keepers' residence

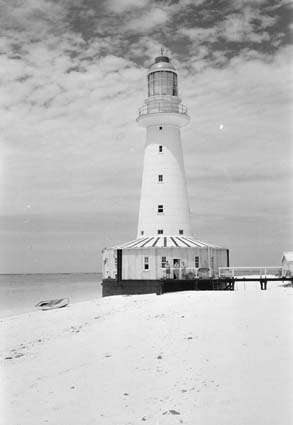
A 1949 photo of the lighthouse

As mentioned above, the lighthouse base is made of bolted cast iron segments, 13 metres (43 ft) in diameter and 4.6 metres (15 ft) high. The tower is 18 metres (59 ft) from the base to the lantern, conical in shape, with four intermediate floor levels. It is built of an internal timber frame, clad with galvanised wrought iron plates, painted white. On top of the tower is a Chance Brothers 10 feet 9 inches (3.28 m) diameter lantern, housing the VRB-25 beacon. The dome of the lantern is painted red.

The lighthouse keepers' residence surrounds the base of the tower. They comprise a ring of eight rooms with three bedrooms, two sitting rooms, two kitchens, and a storeroom. They are constructed of a timber frame with a galvanised iron roof. The external walls are covered with corrugated galvanised iron sheets.

== Site operation and visiting ==
The site and the light are operated by the Australian Maritime Safety Authority. The island is accessible by boat, but both the site and the light are closed to the public.

== See also ==
- List of lighthouses in Australia
