= Cuthbert Bay Wildlife Sanctuary =

Wildlife sanctuary in Andaman and Nicobar Islands

Coordinates: 12°42′33″N 92°58′06″E

- IUCN category IV (habitat/species management area)
- Interactive map of Cuthbert Bay Wildlife Sanctuary
- Location: Middle Andaman Islands
- Area: 5.8 km^{2} (2.2 sq mi)
- Established: 1997

Cuthbert Bay Sanctuary is a wildlife sanctuary situated in the Indian Union territory of Andaman and Nicobar Islands. It is located on the eastern coast of the Middle Andaman Islands. It covers an area of 5.8 square kilometres (2.2 mi^{2}). It was established in 1997.

Despite its smaller size, the sanctuary is among the most significant protected areas in the Andaman & Nicobar Islands. It is a nesting site for three of the four species of marine turtles that visit the islands annually, with hundreds of turtles arriving here each year to lay their eggs.

== Fauna ==
The sanctuary is a nesting ground of Olive Ridley turtles, Leather-back turtles and the Green Sea turtle. Other species like spotted deer, birds, butterflies etc. are also found here.
