= National Highway 4 (India) =

National highway in India

National Highway 4
- Map of National Highway 4 in red

Route information
- Maintained by NHAI
- Length: 333 km (207 mi)

Major junctions
- North end: Lamiya Bay
- South end: Chidytapu

Location
- Country: India
- Primary destinations: Port Blair

Highway system
- Roads in India; Expressways; National; State; Asian
← NH 703A	→ NH 5

National Highway 4, or NH 4, is the major highway in the Indian union territory of Andaman and Nicobar Islands. It is 230.7 km in length. This road running from the capital city of Port Blair to Diglipur connects all the major towns of Ferrargunj, Baratang, Kadamtala, Rangat, Billiground, Nimbudera and Mayabunder. This highway is known as the Great Andaman Trunk Road.

Prior 1970s to early 1990s transportation of men and goods used to take several days by sea route now can be completed in a matter of 10–12 hours. NH-4 facilitates movement of essential commodities, access to health care facilities, etc. year-round.

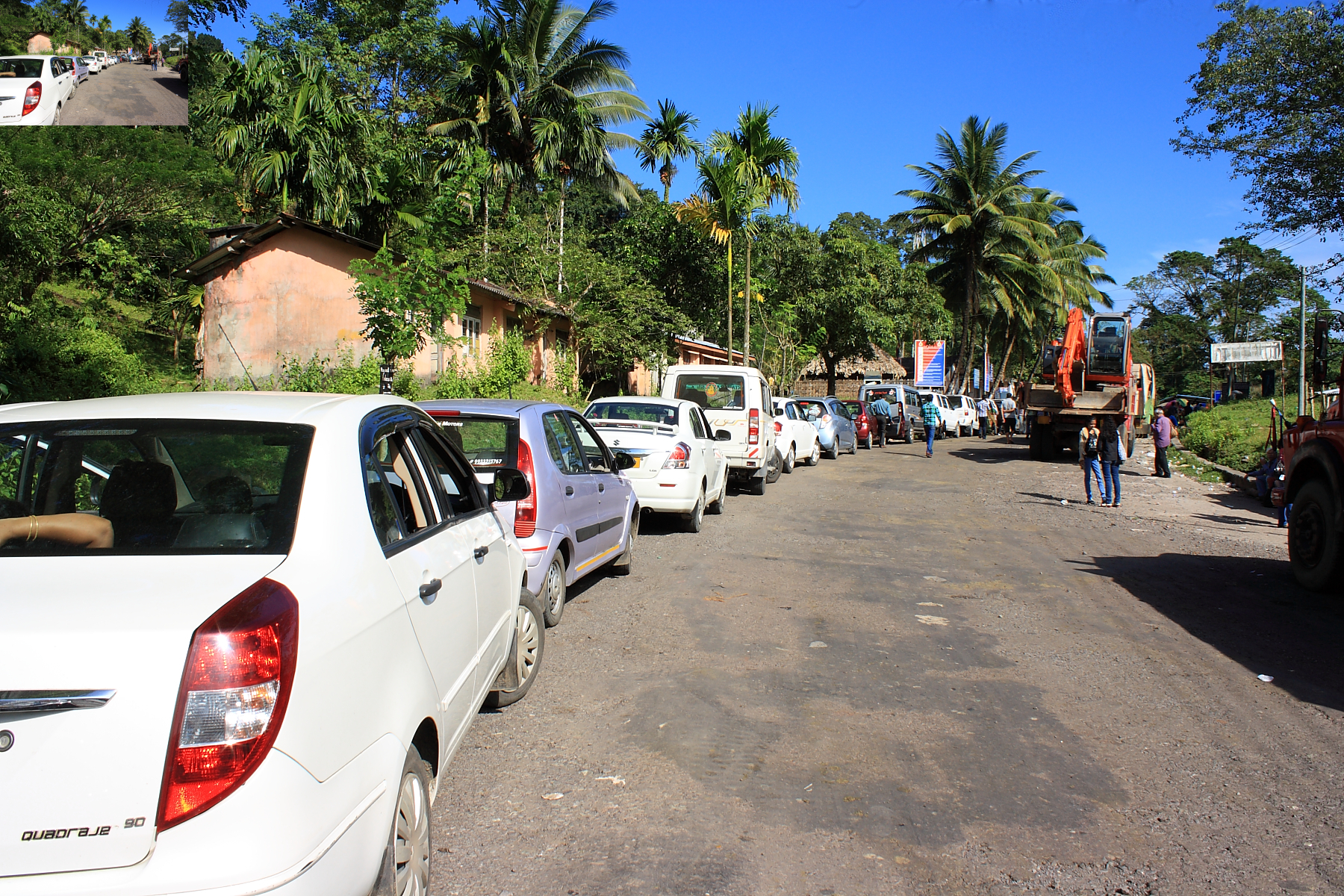
Line of vehicles waiting to enter the Andaman Trunk Road passing through the Jarawa Tribal Reserve (Jirkhatang, South Andaman)

ATR passes through the buffer zone of the Jarwa Reserve between Jirkatang to the Middle Strait where laws are in place to minimize traveler contact with the native tribe of Jarawa. Only vehicle convoys with armed escorts are allowed.

This highway is currently undergoing a major upgrade and construction of two major bridges under NHIDCL of ₹ 1511.22 crores.

Earlier this stretch of highway was numbered as NH-223.

A stretch of national highway from Mumbai to Pune to Belgaum to Bangalore to Chennai was earlier called NH 4 before renumbering of national highways in 2010. The former NH 4 is now renumbered as NH 48.

== See also ==
- List of national highways in India
- National Highways Development Project
