= Andaman district =

- Former district
- Location within Andaman and Nicobar Islands
- Coordinates: 11.6667°N 92.75°E
- Country: India
- Union territory: Andaman and Nicobar Islands

Andaman district was a district in the Indian Union Territory (UT) of the Andaman and Nicobar Islands. The district's administrative territory encompasses all of the Andaman Islands, which are located in the Indian Ocean (Bay of Bengal, bordering with the Andaman Sea). The district government is headed by a Deputy Commissioner, who in turn reports into the Lt. Governor of the Andaman and Nicobar Islands.

The capital of the district is the township of Port Blair, which is also the main town and capital of Andaman and Nicobar Islands UT. The district was severely affected by the tsunami that was caused by the 2004 Indian Ocean earthquake, which led to many deaths and damaged infrastructure.

== Geography ==
There are approximately 550 islands which constituted the Andaman District, out of which 26 are inhabited. The total population of Andaman district as per 2001 Census of India figures was 314,084. The district had a total area of some 6,408 km^{2}. Approximately 90% of the islands are forested or uncultivated; urban area is only 16.6 km^{2}.

== Divisions ==
The district comprised two sub-divisions, North & Middle Andaman (Mayabunder), and South & Little Andaman (Port Blair), which were turned into North and Middle Andaman district and South Andaman district on August 18, 2006.
