= Middle Andaman Island =

Indian island of the Andaman chain

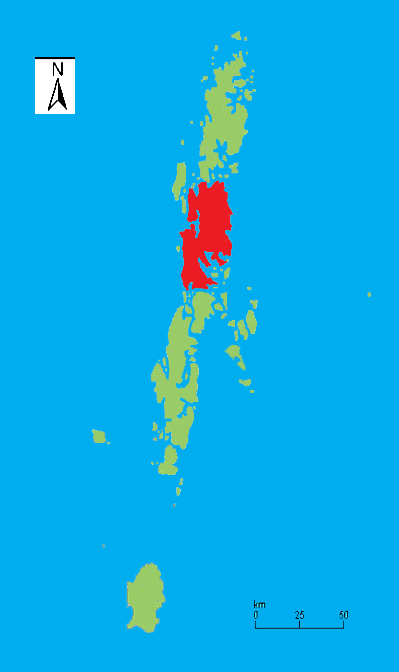
- Outline map of the Andaman Islands, with the location of Middle Andaman Island highlighted (in red).

- Location within Andaman and Nicobar Islands Location within Bay of Bengal

Geography
- Location: Bay of Bengal
- Coordinates: 12.5°N 92.833333°E
- Archipelago: Andaman Islands
- Adjacent to: Indian Ocean
- Total islands: 1
- Major islands: Middle Andaman Island
- Area: 1,523 km^{2} (588 sq mi)
- Length: 70 km (43 mi)
- Width: 28 km (17.4 mi)
- Coastline: 272 km (169 mi)
- Highest elevation: 512 m (1680 ft)
- Highest point: Mount Diavolo

Administration
- India
- District: North and Middle Andaman
- Island group: Andaman Islands
- Island sub-group: Great Andaman
- Taluk: Multiple
- Largest settlement: Rangat Metropolitan (pop 10,000)

Demographics
- Population: 55,632 (2011)^{Only middle andaman villages from the 2011 census}
- Pop. density: 36.5/km^{2} (94.5/sq mi)
- Ethnic groups: Hindu, Andamanese, Jarawa

Additional information
- Time zone: IST (UTC+5:30)
- PIN: 744202
- Telephone code: 031927
- ISO code: IN-AN-00
- Official website: www.and.nic.in
- Literacy: 84.4%
- Avg. summer temperature: 30.2 °C (86.4 °F)
- Avg. winter temperature: 23.0 °C (73.4 °F)
- Sex ratio: 1.2♂/♀
- Census Code: 35.639.0004
- Official Languages: Hindi, English

Middle Andaman Island is an island of the Andaman Islands. It belongs to the North and Middle Andaman administrative district, part of the Indian union territory of Andaman and Nicobar Islands.

== Geography ==
The island belongs to the Great Andaman Chain and is located 73 km (45 mi) north from Port Blair. It is the central island of the Great Andaman archipelago of India, with a total area of 1,536 km^{2}. Middle Andaman is separated from North Andaman Island by Austen Strait, and from Baratang Island at the south by Homfray's Strait, both shallow and narrow channels, a few hundred metres wide; and from Interview Island at its west by the navigable Interview Passage.

The island's coastline was inundated by the tsunami resulting from the 26 December 2004 Indian Ocean earthquake, though the effect was far less severe when compared with other Islands of Andaman and Nicobar Islands.

== Administration ==
Politically, Middle Andaman Island, is part of Mayabunder and Rangat Tehsils.

== Demographics ==
Population of Middle Andaman consists of Bengali, Tamil and Keralite settlers. The island is also home to many of the indigenous Jarawa people. The main occupation of the inhabitants is farming and Agriculture.

Middle Andaman's main towns (Metro population in brackets) are Rangat (10,000), Mayabunder (5,565), Bakultala (4,454), Nimbutala (3,063), and Kadamtala (3,008).

According to the 2011 census of India, the Island has x households. The effective literacy rate (i.e. the literacy rate of population excluding children aged 6 and below) is 76%.

Demographics (2011 Census)
	Total	Male	Female
Population	55,632	28,767	26,865
Children aged below 6 years	2,065	1,039	1,026
Scheduled caste	0	0	0
Scheduled tribe	3	3	3
Literates	42,294	22,946	19,348
Workers (all)	2	2	0
Main workers (total)	2	2	0

== Tourism ==
The island has some immaculate waterfalls and pretty beaches. Camping, trekking, scuba diving, snorkeling, and other water sports are available to visitors.

== See also ==
- Cuthbert Bay Wildlife Sanctuary-Wildlife Sanctuary in the Middle Andaman Island group
