= North and Middle Andaman district =

- District of the Andaman and Nicobar Islands
- Location within Andaman and Nicobar Islands Location within India
- Coordinates: 12°55′12″N 92°54′00″E
- Country: India
- Union territory: Andaman and Nicobar Islands
- Formation: 18 August 2006
- headquarter: Mayabunder

Population (2011)
  - Total: 105,597
- Time zone: UTC+5:30 (IST)
- Website: northmiddle.andaman.nic.in

North and Middle Andaman district is one of the 3 districts of the Indian Union Territory of Andaman and Nicobar Islands located in the Bay of Bengal. Mayabunder town is the district headquarters. The area covered by this district is 3251.85 km^{2}.

== History ==
Historical population
Year	Pop.	±% p.a.
1901	6,999	—
1911	6,807	−0.28%
1921	6,874	+0.10%
1931	7,417	+0.76%
1941	8,225	+1.04%
1951	7,317	−1.16%
1961	18,901	+9.96%
1971	35,605	+6.54%
1981	58,716	+5.13%
1991	84,312	+3.68%
2001	105,613	+2.28%
2011	105,597	−0.00%

This district was created on August 18, 2006, by bifurcating the erstwhile Andaman district, which included all three tehsils of Mayabunder sub-division of this erstwhile district.

== Geography ==
North and Middle Andaman district occupies an area of 3,227 square kilometres (1,246 sq mi), covering North Andaman Island, Middle Andaman Island, Interview Island, Long Island and Baratang Island.

== Demography ==
According to the 2011 census North and Middle Andaman district has a population of 105,597, roughly equal to the nation of Tonga. This gives it a ranking of 614th in India (out of a total of 640). The district has a population density of 32 inhabitants per square kilometre (83/sq mi) . Its population growth rate over the decade 2001-2011 was -0.07%. North And Middle Andaman has a sex ratio of 925 females for every 1000 males, and a literacy rate of 84.25%.

=== Language ===
North and Middle Andaman district in 2011 census
1. Bengali (53.8%)
2. Sadri (11.1%)
3. Telugu (6.47%)
4. Kurukh (6.17%)
5. Hindi (5.99%)
6. Tamil (5.94%)
7. Malalyalam (3.16%)
8. S'gaw Karen (1.89%)
9. Nicobarese (0.57%)
10. Others (4.96%)

Bengali is the most spoken language in North and Middle Andaman Islands. As of 2011 census, Bengali is spoken as the first language by 53.79 per cent of the district's population followed by Sadri (11.06%), Telugu (6.47%), Kurukh (6.17%), Hindi (5.99%), Tamil (5.94%), Malayalam (3.16%), Nicobarese (0.57%) and others.

Karen people, a Sino-Tibetan ethnic group from Kayin State, Myanmar, numbering about 2000 people are also present in eight villages in the Mayabunder and Diglipur tehsils:

=== Religion ===
Religion in North and Middle Andaman district (2011 census)
1. Hinduism (76.9%)
2. Christianity (20.7%)
3. Islam (2.05%)
4. Buddhism (0.08%)
5. Sikhism (0.07%)
6. Others (0.22%)

Hinduism is followed by majority of the people in North and Middle Andaman district. Christianity is followed by a considerable population.

== Divisions ==
The district comprises 3 tehsils, Diglipur, Mayabunder and Rangat.

== Economy ==
As of 2010, the district's chief agricultural products were rice (about 6500 ha), coconuts (3600 ha), rabi pulses (2900 ha), areca nuts (1300 ha), and bananas (650 ha).

== See also ==
- South Andaman district
