= Andaman Islands =

Indian archipelago in the Bay of Bengal

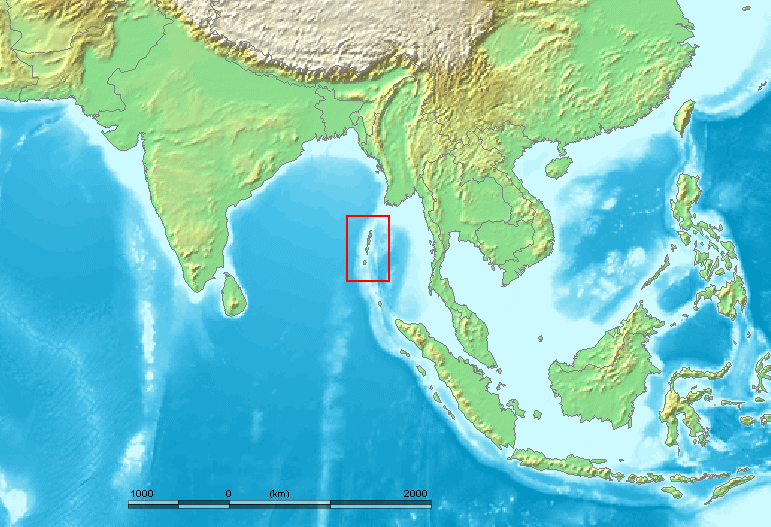
- Location in the Indian Ocean

Geography
- Location: Bay of Bengal
- Coordinates: 12°30′N 92°45′E
- Archipelago: Andaman and Nicobar Islands
- Total islands: 572
- Major islands: North Andaman Island, Little Andaman, Middle Andaman Island, South Andaman Island
- Area: 6,408 km^{2} (2,474 sq mi)
- Highest elevation: 732 m (2402 ft)
- Highest point: Saddle Peak

Administration
- India
- Union territory: Andaman and Nicobar Islands
- Capital city: Port Blair
- Myanmar
- Administrative region: Yangon Region
- Capital city: Yangon

Demographics
- Population: 343,739 (2011)
- Pop. density: 53.64/km^{2} (138.93/sq mi)
- Ethnic groups: Bamar; Indic; Dravidian; Jarawa; Onge; Sentinelese; Great Andamanese

Additional information
- Time zone: IST (UTC+5:30)
  - Summer (DST): not observed (UTC+5:30)
- Official website: www.andaman.nic.in

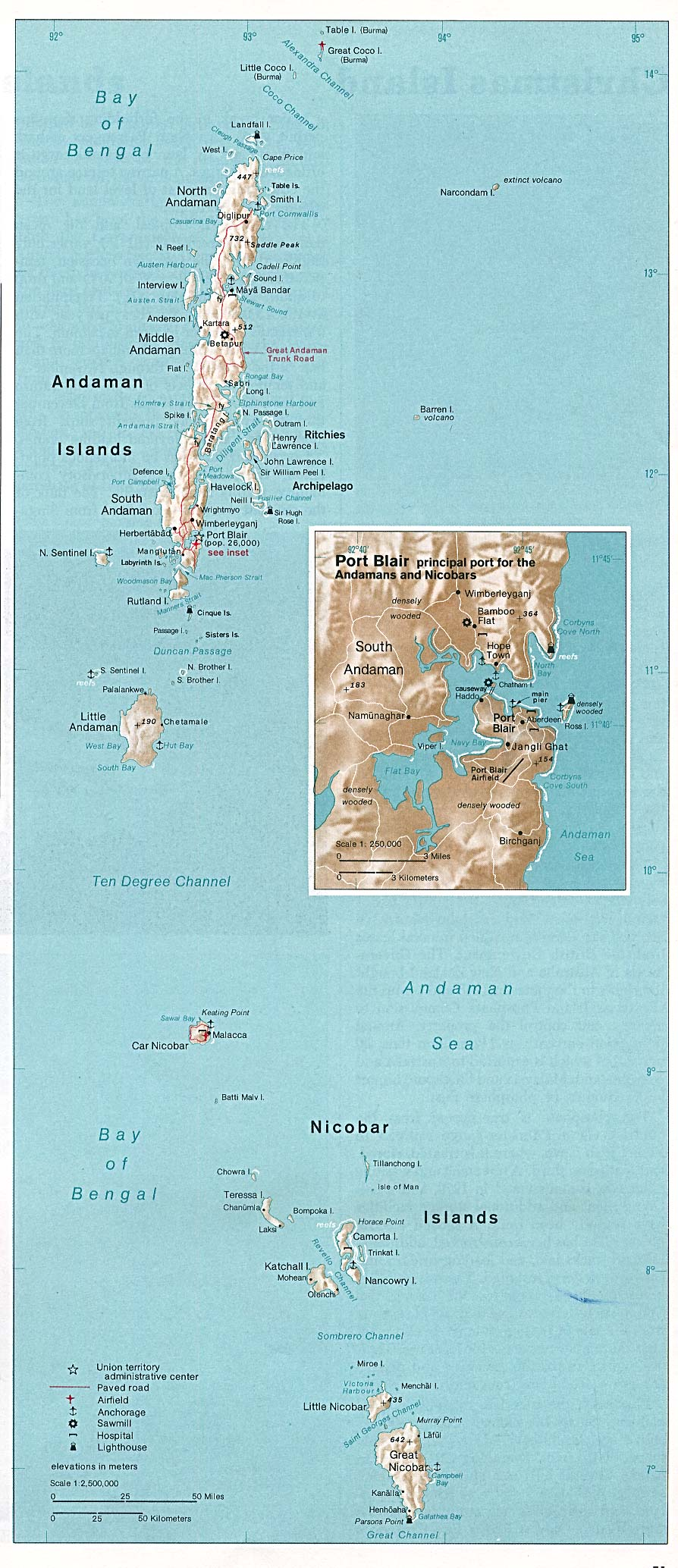
Detailed map of the Andaman and Nicobar Islands

The Andaman Islands (/ˈændəmən/) are an archipelago, made up of 306 islands and 260 islets, in the northeastern Indian Ocean about 130 km (81 mi) southwest off the coasts of Myanmar's Ayeyarwady Region. Together with the Nicobar Islands to their south, the Andamans serve as a maritime boundary between the Bay of Bengal to the west and the Andaman Sea to the east. Most of the islands are part of the Andaman and Nicobar Islands, a Union Territory of India, while the Coco Islands and Preparis Island are part of the Yangon Region of Myanmar.

The Andaman Islands are home to the Andamanese, a group of indigenous people made up of a number of indigenous tribes, including the Jarawa and Sentinelese. While some of the islands can be visited with permits, entry to others, including North Sentinel Island, is banned by law. The Sentinelese are generally hostile to visitors and have had little contact with any other peoples, and the Indian Government and Coast Guard prohibit approaches within 3 nautical miles (5.6 km) from the island to protect the natives' right to privacy.

== History ==
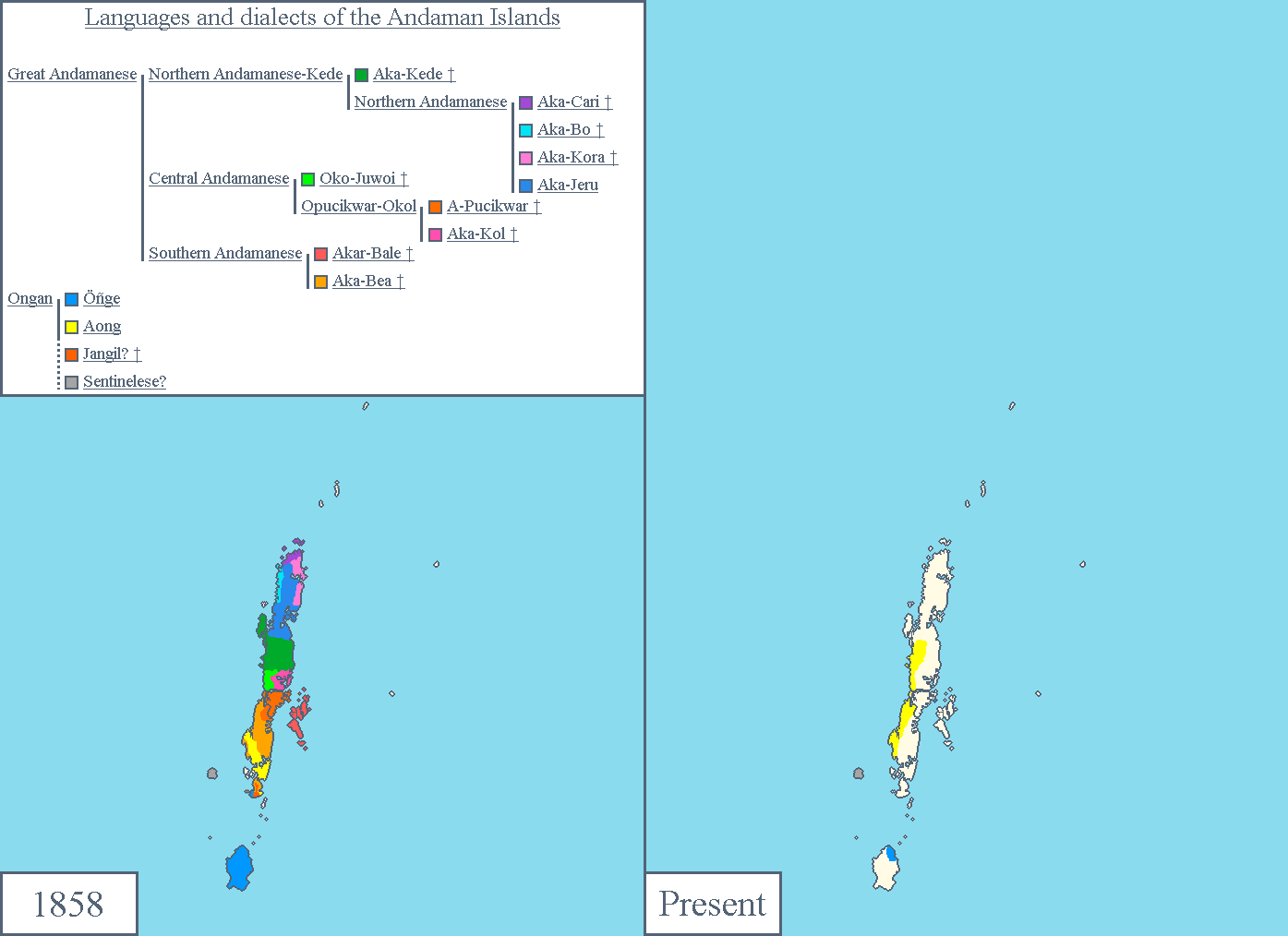
The distributions of different Andamanese peoples, languages, and dialects at the time of British contact compared to the present-day

=== Etymology ===
In the 13th century, the name of Andaman appears in Late Middle Chinese as ʔˠan^{H} dɑ mˠan (晏陀蠻, pronounced yàntuómán in modern Mandarin Chinese) in the book Zhu Fan Zhi by Zhao Rukuo. In Chapter 38 of the book, Countries in the Sea, Zhao Rukuo specifies that going from Lambri (Sumatra) to Ceylon, an unfavourable wind makes ships drift towards the Andaman Islands. In the 15th century, Andaman was recorded as "Andeman Mountain" (安得蠻山, pronounced āndémán shān in modern Mandarin Chinese) during the voyages of Zheng He in the Mao Kun map of the Wu Bei Zhi.

=== Early inhabitants ===
The oldest archaeological evidence for the habitation of the islands dates to the 1st millennium BC. Genetic evidence suggests that the indigenous Andamanese peoples share a common origin, and that the islands were settled sometime after 26,000 years ago, possibly at the end of the Last Glacial Period, when sea levels were much lower, reducing the distance between the Andaman Islands and the Asian mainland, with genetic estimates suggesting that the two main linguistic groups diverged around 16,000 years ago. Andamanese peoples are a genetically distinct group highly divergent from other Asian peoples.

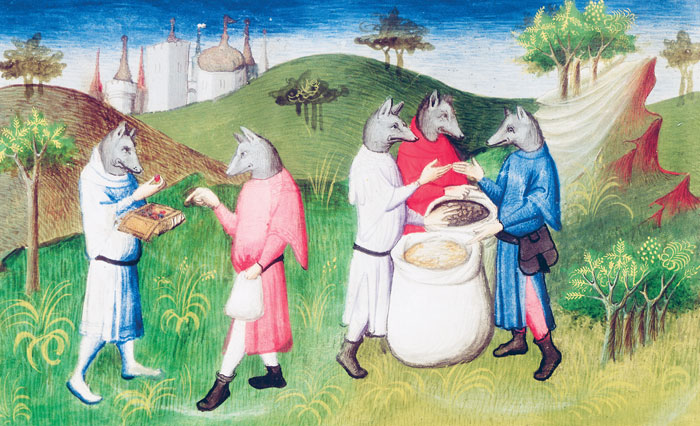
The Andaman Islands in the Bay of Bengal were said to be inhabited by wolf-headed people, who were depicted in a "book of wonders" produced in Paris in the early 15th century.

=== Chola empire ===
Rajendra I took over the Andaman and Nicobar Islands. He used the Andaman and Nicobar Islands as a strategic naval base to launch an expedition against the Sriwijaya Empire. The Cholas called the island Ma-Nakkavaram ("great open/naked land"), found in the Thanjavur inscription of 1050 CE. European traveller Marco Polo (12th–13th century) also referred to this island as 'Necuverann' and a corrupted form of the Tamil name Nakkavaram would have led to the modern name Nicobar during the British colonial period.

=== British colonial era ===
In 1789, the Bengal Presidency established a naval base and penal colony on Chatham Island in the southeast bay of Great Andaman. The settlement is now known as Port Blair (after the Bombay Marine lieutenant Archibald Blair who founded it). After two years, the colony was moved to the northeast part of Great Andaman and was named Port Cornwallis after Admiral William Cornwallis. However, there was much disease and death in the penal colony and the government ceased operating it in May 1796.

In 1824, Port Cornwallis was the rendezvous of the fleet carrying the army to the First Burmese War. In the 1830s and 1840s, shipwrecked crews who landed on the Andamans were often attacked and killed by the natives and the islands had a reputation for cannibalism. The loss of the Runnymede and the Briton in 1844 during the same storm, while transporting goods and passengers between India and Australia, and the continuous attacks launched by the natives, which the survivors fought off, alarmed the British government. In 1855, the government proposed another settlement on the islands, including a convict establishment, but the Indian Rebellion of 1857 forced a delay in its construction. However, because the rebellion led to the British holding a large number of prisoners, it made the new Andaman settlement and prison urgently necessary. Construction began in November 1857 at Port Blair using inmates' labour, avoiding the vicinity of a salt swamp that seemed to have been the source of many of the earlier problems at Port Cornwallis.

The Battle of Aberdeen was fought on 17 May 1859 between the Great Andamanese tribe and the British. Today, a memorial stands in Andaman water sports complex as a tribute to the people who died in the battle. Fearful of British intentions and with help from an escaped convict from Cellular Jail, the Great Andamanese attacked the British settlement, but they were outnumbered and soon suffered heavy casualties. Later, it was identified that an escaped convict named Dudhnath Tewari had changed sides and informed the British about the tribe's plans.

In 1867, the merchantman Nineveh was wrecked on the reef of North Sentinel Island. The 86 survivors reached the beach in the ship's boats. On the third day, they were attacked with iron-tipped spears by naked islanders. One person from the ship escaped in a boat and the others were later rescued by a British Royal Navy ship.

For some time, sickness and mortality were high, but swamp reclamation and extensive forest clearance continued. The Andaman colony became notorious with the murder of the Viceroy Richard Southwell Bourke, 6th Earl of Mayo, on a visit to the settlement (8 February 1872), by a Pathan from Afghanistan, Sher Ali Afridi. In the same year, the two island groups Andaman and Nicobar, were united under a chief commissioner residing at Port Blair.

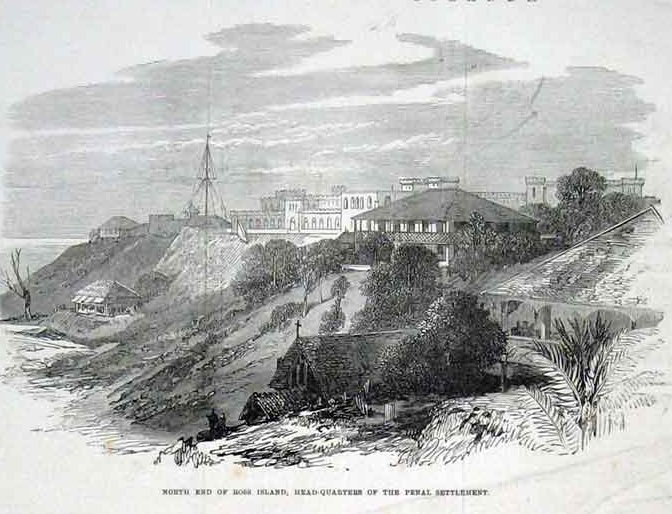
The Ross Island prison headquarters, 1872

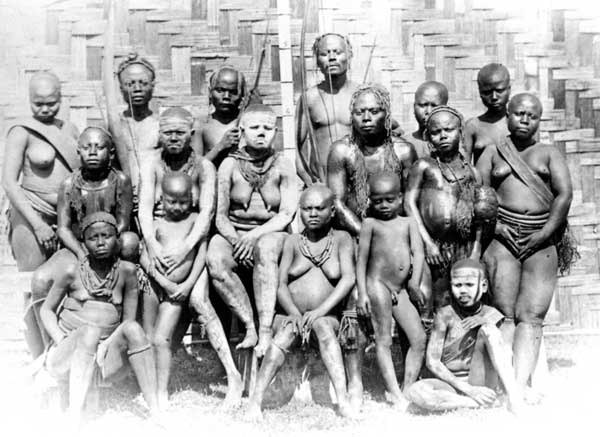
Great Andamanese women, children, and one man, 1876

From the time of its development in 1858 under the direction of James Pattison Walker, and in response to the mutiny and rebellion of the previous year, the settlement was first and foremost a repository for political prisoners. The Cellular Jail at Port Blair, when completed in 1910, included 698 cells designed for solitary confinement; each cell measured 4.5 by 2.7 m (15 by 9 ft) with a single ventilation window 3 metres (10 ft) above the floor.

The Indians imprisoned here referred to the island and its prison as Kala Pani ("black water"), named for kala pani, the Hindu proscription against travelling across the open sea. Incarceration on the Andamans thus threatened prisoners with the loss of their caste, and resultant social exclusion; a 1996 film set on the island took that term as its title, Kaalapani. The number of prisoners who died in this camp is estimated to be in the thousands. Many more died of harsh treatment and the strenuous living and working conditions in this camp.

The Viper Chain Gang Jail on Viper Island was reserved for extraordinarily troublesome prisoners and was also the site of hangings. In the 20th century, it became a convenient place to house prominent members of India's independence movement.

=== Japanese occupation ===
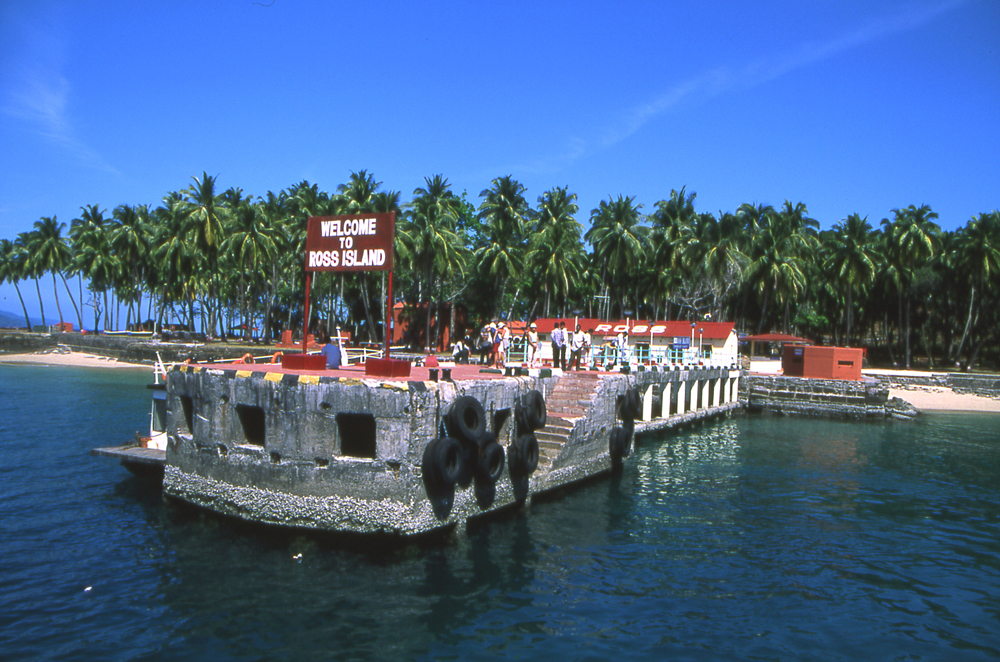
Netaji Subhash Chandra Bose Island in 2004

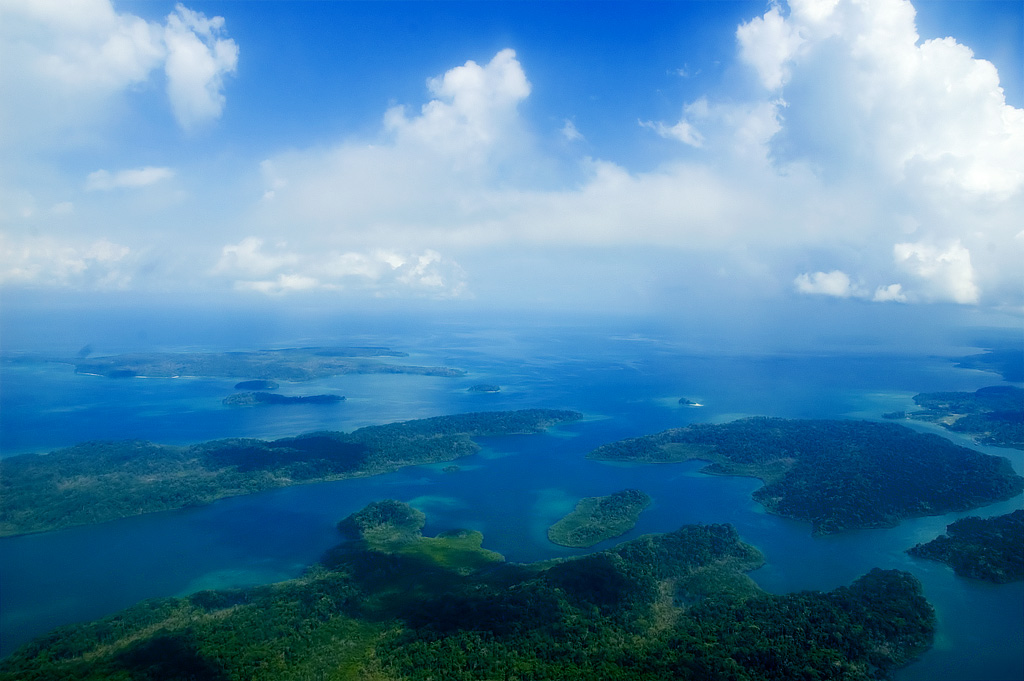
Andaman Islands

The Andaman and Nicobar Islands were occupied by Japan during World War II. The islands were nominally put under the authority of the Arzi Hukumat-e-Azad Hind (Provisional Government of Free India) headed by Subhas Chandra Bose, who visited the islands during the war, and renamed them as Shaheed (Martyr) & Swaraj (Self-rule). On 30 December 1943, during the Japanese occupation, Bose, who was allied with the Japanese, first raised the flag of Indian independence. General Loganathan, of the Indian National Army, was Governor of the Andaman and Nicobar Islands, which had been annexed to the Provisional Government. According to Werner Gruhl: "Before leaving the islands, the Japanese rounded up and executed 750 innocents."

=== Post-World War II ===
At the close of World War II, the British government announced its intention to shut down the penal settlement. The government proposed to employ former inmates in an initiative to develop the island's fisheries, timber, and agricultural resources. In exchange, inmates would be granted return passage to the Indian mainland, or the right to settle on the islands. J H Williams, one of the Bombay Burma Company's senior officials, was dispatched to perform a timber survey of the islands using convict labor. He recorded his findings in 'The Spotted Deer' (published in 1957 by Rupert Hart-Davis).

The penal colony was eventually closed on 15 August 1947 when India gained independence. It has since served as a museum to the independence movement.

Most of the Andaman Islands became part of the Republic of India in 1950 and was declared as a union territory of the nation in 1956, while the Preparis Island and Coco Islands became part of the Yangon Region of Myanmar in 1948.

=== Late 20th Century – 21st century ===
==== Outside visits ====
In April 1998, American photographer John S. Callahan organised the first surfing project in the Andamans, starting from Phuket in Thailand with the assistance of Southeast Asia Liveaboards (SEAL), a UK owned dive charter company. With a crew of international professional surfers, they crossed the Andaman Sea on the yacht Crescent and cleared formalities in Port Blair. The group proceeded to Little Andaman Island, where they spent ten days surfing several spots for the first time, including Jarawa Point near Hut Bay and the long right reef point at the southwest tip of the island, named Kumari Point. The resulting article in Surfer Magazine, "Quest for Fire" by journalist Sam George, put the Andaman Islands on the surfing map for the first time. Footage of the waves of the Andaman Islands also appeared in the film Thicker than Water, shot by documentary filmmaker Jack Johnson. Callahan went on to make several more surfing projects in the Andamans, including a trip to the Nicobar Islands in 1999.

In November 2018, John Allen Chau, an American missionary, traveled illegally with the help of local fishermen to the North Sentinel Island off the Andaman Islands chain group on several occasions, despite a travel ban to the island. Despite some relaxation introduced earlier in 2018 to the stringent visit permit system for the islands, North Sentinel Island was still highly protected from outside contact. Special permission to allow researchers and anthropologists to visit could be sought. Chau had no special clearance and knew that his visit was illegal. He is reported to have been killed.

Although a less restrictive system of approval to visit some of the islands now applies, with non-Indian nationals no longer required to obtain pre-approval with a Restricted Area Permit (RAP), foreign visitors must still show their passport at Immigration at Port Blair Airport and Seaport for verification. Citizens of Afghanistan, China and Pakistan, or other foreign nationals whose origin is any of these countries, are still required to obtain a RAP to visit Andaman and Nicobar Islands. Similarly, citizens of Myanmar who wish to visit Mayabunder or Diglipur must also apply for a RAP. In these cases, the permits must be pre-approved prior to arrival in Port Blair.

==== Natural disasters ====
On 26 December 2004, the coast of the Andaman Islands was devastated by a 10-metre-high (33 ft) tsunami following the 2004 Indian Ocean earthquake, which is the longest recorded earthquake, lasting for between 500 and 600 seconds. Strong oral tradition in the area warned of the importance of moving inland after a quake and is credited with saving many lives. In the aftermath, more than 2,000 people were confirmed dead and more than 4,000 children were orphaned or had lost one parent. At least 40,000 residents were rendered homeless and were moved to relief camps. On 11 August 2009, a magnitude 7 earthquake struck near the Andaman Islands, causing a tsunami warning to go into effect. On 30 March 2010, a magnitude 6.9 earthquake struck near the Andaman Islands.

== Geography and geology ==
The Andaman Archipelago is an oceanic continuation of the Burmese Arakan Yoma range in the north and of the Indonesian Archipelago in the south. It has 325 islands which cover an area of 6,408 km^{2} (2,474 sq mi), with the Andaman Sea to the east between the islands and the coast of Burma. North Andaman Island is 285 kilometres (177 mi) south of Burma, although a few smaller Burmese islands are closer, including the three Coco Islands.

The Ten Degree Channel separates the Andamans from the Nicobar Islands to the south. The highest point is located in North Andaman Island (Saddle Peak at 732 m (2,402 ft)).

The geology of the Andaman islands consists essentially of Late Jurassic to Early Eocene ophiolites and sedimentary rocks (argillaceous and algal limestones), deformed by numerous deep faults and thrusts with ultramafic igneous intrusions. There are at least 11 mud volcanoes on the islands. There are two volcanic islands, Narcondam Island and Barren Island, which have produced basalt and andesite. Barren Island is the only active volcano in the Indian sub-continent, with the latest eruption reported in December 2022, leading to the potential for geotourism.

== Climate ==
The climate is typical of tropical islands of similar latitude. It is always warm, but with sea breezes. Rainfall is irregular, usually dry during the north-east monsoons, and very wet during the south-west monsoons.

== Flora ==
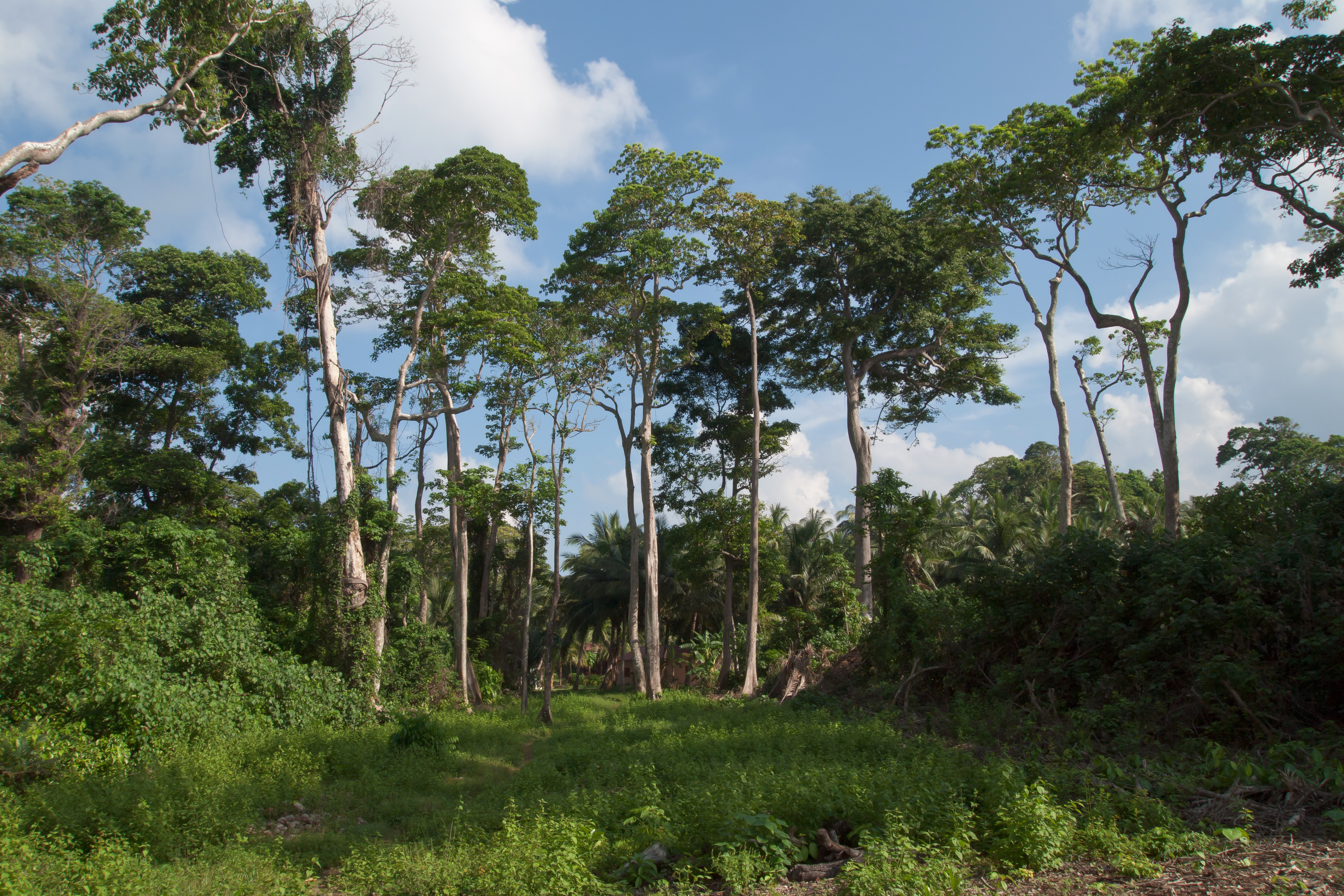
Tropical forest, Shaheed Dweep, (Neil Island)

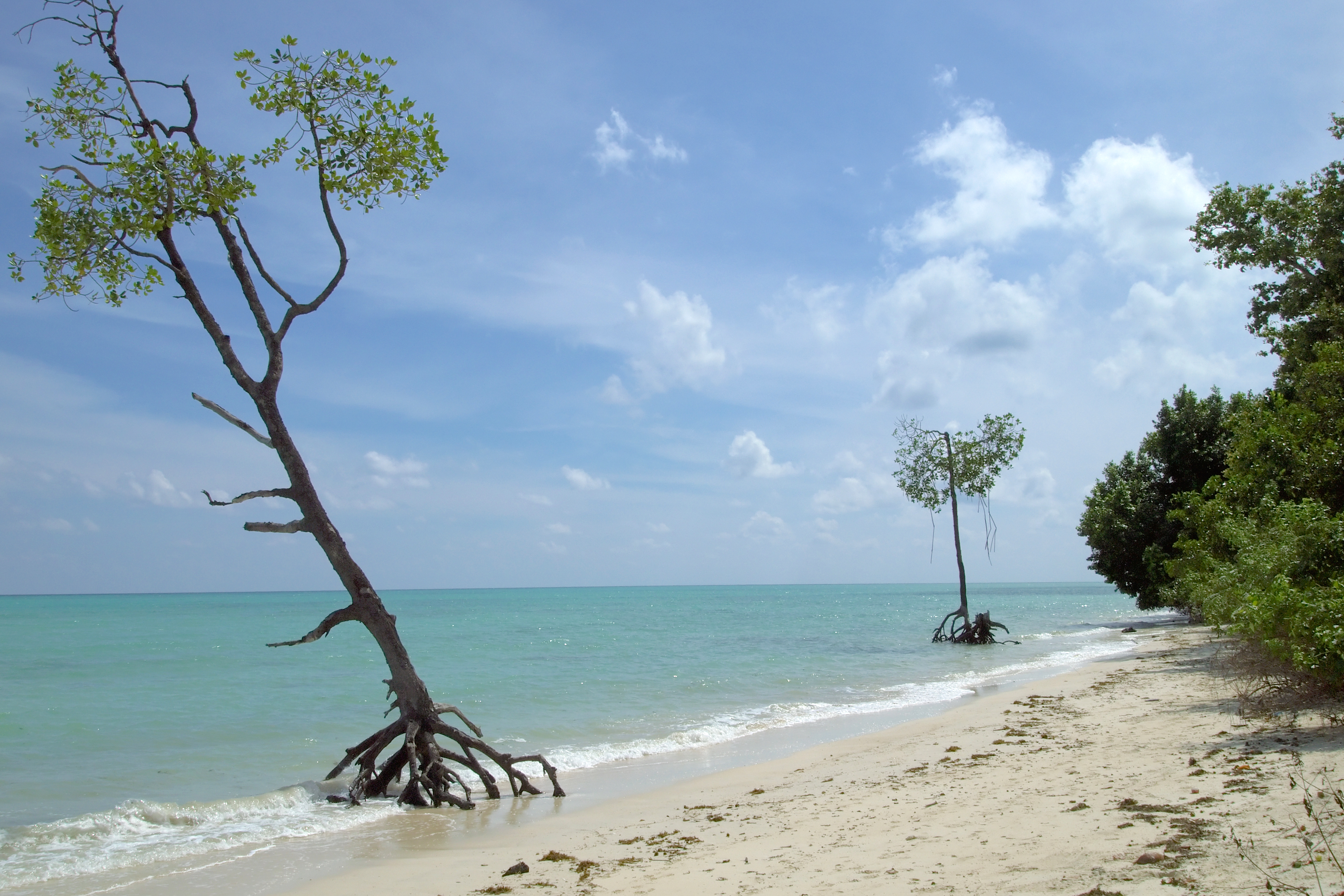
Mangrove trees on the beach, Havelock Island

The Middle Andamans harbour mostly moist deciduous forests. North Andamans is characterised by the wet evergreen type, with plenty of woody climbers.

The natural vegetation of the Andamans is tropical forest, with mangroves on the coast. The rainforests are similar in composition to those of the west coast of Burma. Most of the forests are evergreen, but there are areas of deciduous forest on North Andaman, Middle Andaman, Baratang and parts of South Andaman Island. The South Andaman forests have a profuse growth of epiphytic vegetation, mostly ferns and orchids.

The Andaman forests are largely unspoiled, despite logging and the demands of the fast-growing population driven by immigration from the Indian mainland. There are protected areas on Little Andaman, Narcondam, North Andaman and South Andaman, but these are mainly aimed at preserving the coast and the marine wildlife rather than the rainforests. Threats to wildlife come from introduced species including rats, dogs, cats and the elephants of Interview Island and North Andaman.

Scientists discovered a new species of green algae species in the Andaman archipelago, naming it Acetabularia jalakanyakae. "Jalakanyaka" is a Sanskrit word that means "mermaid".

=== Timber ===
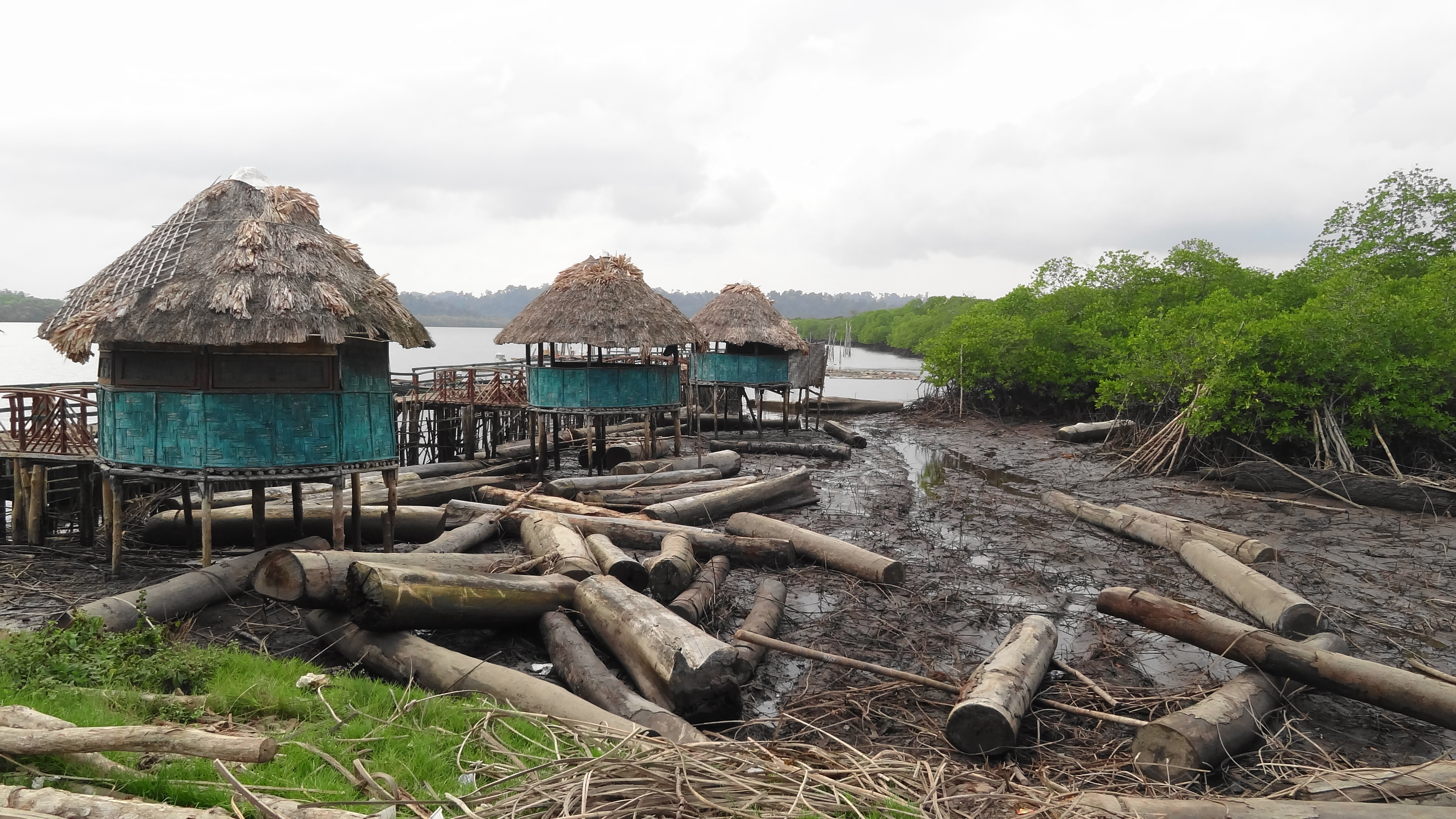
Stilt houses in an Andamanese timber operation

Andaman forests contain 200 or more timber producing species of trees, out of which about 30 varieties are considered to be commercial. Major commercial timber species are Gurjan (Dipterocarpus spp.) and Padauk (Pterocarpus dalbergioides). The following ornamental woods are noted for their pronounced grain formation:

- Marble wood (Diospyros marmorata)
- Andaman Padauk (Pterocarpus dalbergioides)
- Silver grey (a special formation of wood in white utkarsh)
- Chooi (Sageraea elliptica)
- Kokko (Albizzia lebbeck)

Padauk wood is sturdier than teak and is widely used for furniture making.

There are burr wood and buttress root formations in Andaman Padauk. The largest piece of buttress known from Andaman was a dining table of 13 ft × 7 ft (4.0 m × 2.1 m). The largest piece of burr wood was made into a dining table for eight.

The Rudraksha (Elaeocarps sphaericus) and aromatic Dhoop-resin trees also are found here.

== Fauna ==
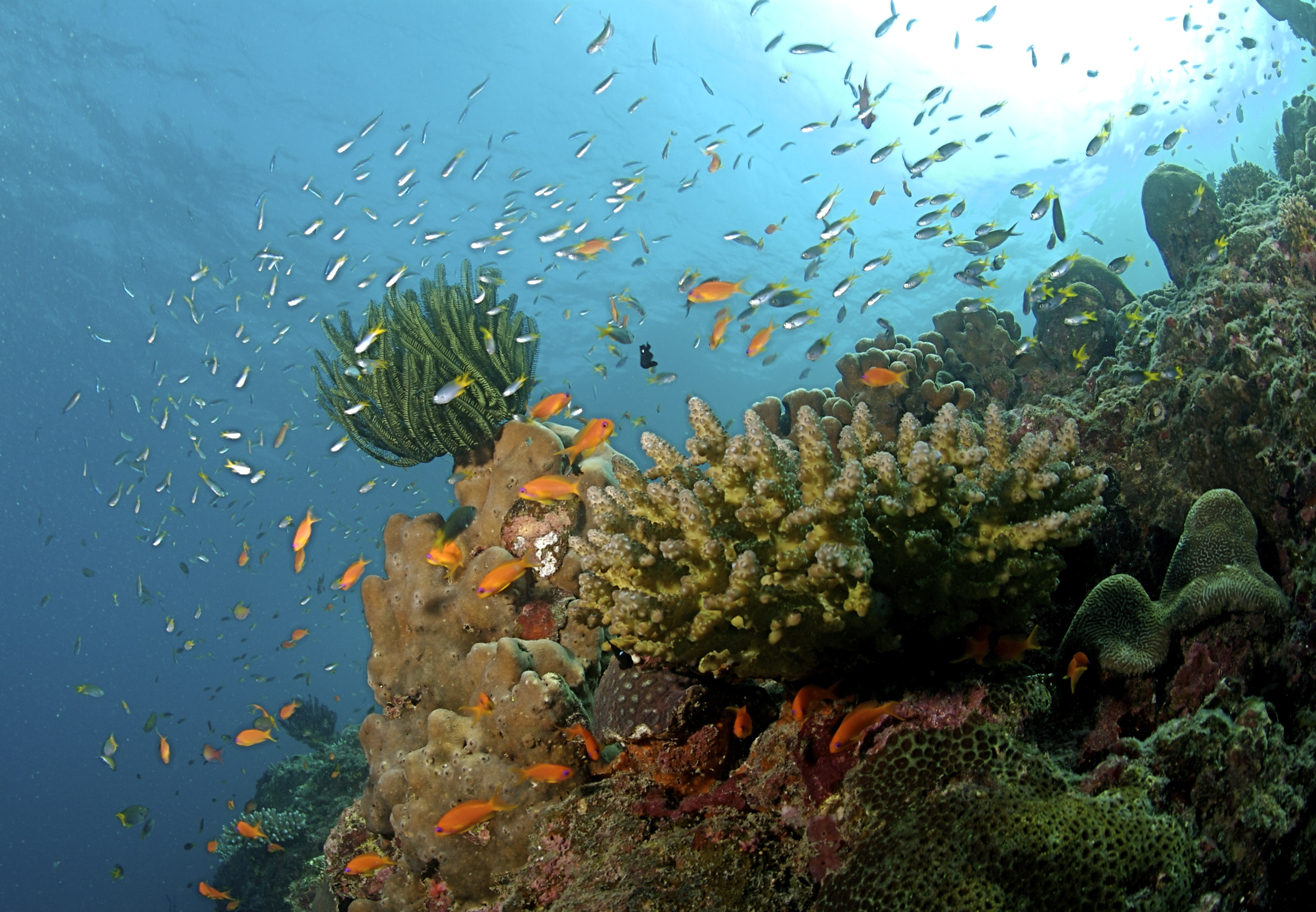
The coral reef at Havelock in Andaman

The Andaman Islands are home to a number of animals, many of them endemic. Andaman & Nicobar islands are home to 10% of all Indian fauna species. The islands are only 0.25% of the country's geographical area, but has 11,009 species, according to a publication by the Zoological Survey of India.

=== Mammals ===
The island's endemic mammals include

- Andaman spiny shrew (Crocidura hispida)
- Andaman shrew (Crocidura andamanensis)
- Jenkins's shrew (Crocidura jenkinsi)
- Andaman horseshoe bat (Rhinolophus cognatus)
- Andaman rat (Rattus stoicus)

The banded pig (Sus scrofa vittatus), also known as the Andaman wild boar and once thought to be an endemic subspecies, is protected by the Wildlife Protection Act 1972 (Sch I). The spotted deer (Axis axis), the Indian muntjac (Muntiacus muntjak) and the sambar (Rusa unicolor) were all introduced to the Andaman islands, though the sambar did not survive.

Interview Island (the largest wildlife sanctuary in the territory) in Middle Andaman holds a population of feral elephants, which were brought in for forest work by a timber company and released when the company went bankrupt. This population has been subject to research studies.

=== Birds ===
Endemic or near endemic birds include

- Spilornis elgini, a serpent-eagle
- Rallina canningi, a crake (endemic; data-deficient per IUCN 2000)
- Columba palumboides, a wood-pigeon
- Macropygia rufipennis, a cuckoo dove
- Centropus andamanensis, a subspecies of brown coucal (endemic)
- Otus balli, a scops owl
- Ninox affinis, a hawk-owl
- Rhyticeros narcondami, the Narcondam hornbill
- Dryocopus hodgei, a woodpecker
- Dicrurus andamanensis, a drongo
- Dendrocitta bayleyii, a treepie
- Sturnus erythropygius, the white-headed starling
- Collocalia affinis, the plume-toed swiftlet
- Aerodramus fuciphagus, the edible-nest swiftlet

The islands' many caves, such as those at Chalis Ek are nesting grounds for the edible-nest swiftlet, whose nests are prized in China for bird's nest soup.

=== Reptiles and amphibians ===
The islands also have a number of endemic reptiles, toads and frogs, such as the Andaman cobra (Naja sagittifera), South Andaman krait (Bungarus andamanensis) and Andaman water monitor (Varanus salvator andamanensis).

There is a sanctuary 72 km (45 mi) from Havelock Island for saltwater crocodiles. Over the past 25 years there have been 24 crocodile attacks with four fatalities, including the death of American tourist Lauren Failla. The government has been criticised for failing to inform tourists of the crocodile sanctuary and danger, while simultaneously promoting tourism. Crocodiles are not only found within the sanctuary, but throughout the island chain in varying densities. They are habitat restricted, so the population is stable but not large. Populations occur throughout available mangrove habitat on all major islands, including a few creeks on Havelock. The species uses the ocean as a means of travel between different rivers and estuaries, thus they are not as commonly observed in open ocean. It is best to avoid swimming near mangrove areas or the mouths of creeks; swimming in the open ocean should be safe, but it is best to have a spotter around.

== Demographics ==
The Andaman Islands forms 90.32% of the Union Territory's population.

Historical population
Year	Pop.	±%
1901	18,138	—
1911	17,641	−2.7%
1921	17,814	+1.0%
1931	19,223	+7.9%
1941	21,316	+10.9%
1951	18,962	−11.0%
1961	48,985	+158.3%
1971	93,468	+90.8%
1981	158,287	+69.3%
1991	241,453	+52.5%
2001	314,084	+30.1%
2011	343,739	+9.4%
Source: Census of India

As per 2011 census, Andaman had a population of 343,739 people, with 182,144 being males and 161,595 being females, making the sex ratio of 887 females per 1000 males. The population density is 53.64 inhabitants per square kilometre (138.9/sq mi). The average literacy is 87.5%, while male literacy is 91.0% and female literacy is 83.5%. 143,488 people live in urban areas.

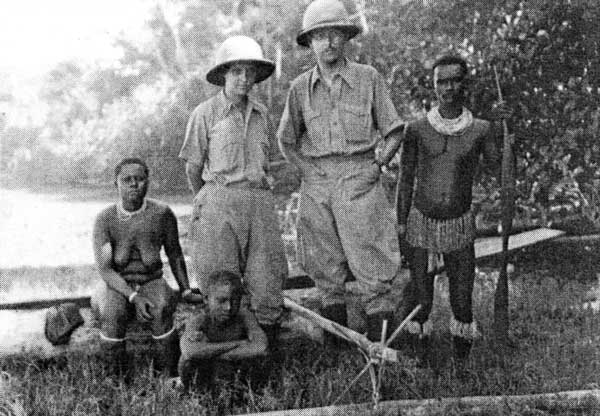
The von Eickstedts with some Andamanese people in 1926

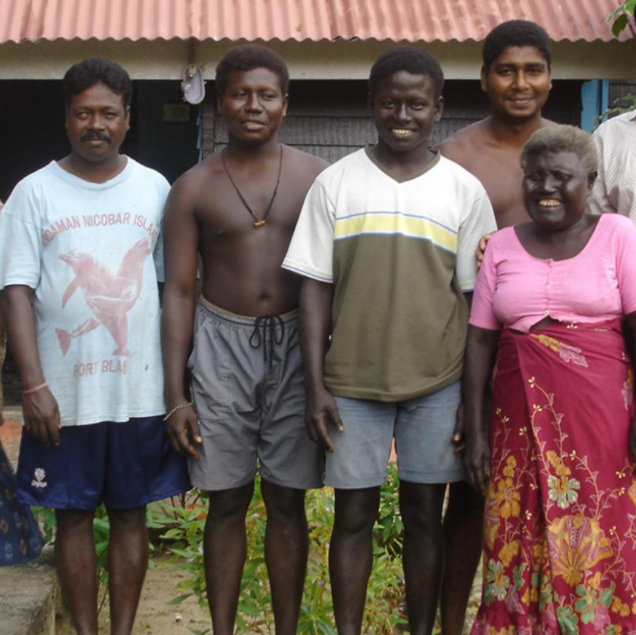
An Andamanese family on the Great Andaman island in 2006

As of 2011, the population of the Andaman Islands was 343,125, having grown from 50,000 in 1960. The bulk of the population originates from immigrants who came to the islands since the start of colonial times, mainly of Bengali, Hindustani, Telugu, Tamil, and Malayalam backgrounds.

A small minority of the population are the Andamanese, the aboriginal inhabitants (adivasi) of the islands. When they first came into sustained contact with outside groups in the 1850s, there were an estimated 7,000 Andamanese, divided into the Great Andamanese, Jarawa (or Aong), Jangil (or Rutland Jarawa/Onge), Onge, and the Sentinelese (an uncontacted people).. The Great Andamanese originally formed 10 tribes of 5,000 people total. As the number of settlers from the mainland increased (at first mostly prisoners and involuntary indentured labourers, later purposely recruited farmers), the Andamanese suffered an extreme population decline due to the introduction of outside infectious diseases, land encroachment from settlers, and conflict.

Some demographic figures from the end of the 20th century estimate there remain only approximately 400–450 ethnic Andamanese still on the islands, and as few as 50 speakers of Andamanese languages. The Jangil people are extinct. Most of the Great Andamanese tribes are extinct, and the survivors, now just 52, speak mostly Hindi. The Onge are reduced to less than 100 people. Only the Jarawa and Sentinelese still maintain a steadfast independence and refuse most attempts at contact; their numbers are uncertain but estimated to be in the low hundreds.

Due to their isolated island location, the Andamanese peoples have mostly avoided contact with the outside world. Their languages are a reflection of this, with distinct linguistics that have strong morphological features, such as root words, prefixes, and suffixes, with very little relation to surrounding geographic regions. The indigenous languages are collectively referred to as the Andamanese languages, but they make up at least two independent families (Great Andamanese and Ongan, as well as two presumed but unattested languages, Sentinelese and Jangil), and the dozen or so attested languages are either extinct or endangered.

=== Religion ===
Source: Census of India
1. Hinduism (75.1%)
2. Christianity (17.3%)
3. Islam (7.09%)
4. Sikhism (0.21%)
5. Buddhism (0.07%)
6. Jainism (0.01%)
7. Other Religion^ (0.07%)
8. Not stated (0.18%)
^Includes Animism religion.

Most of the tribal people in Andaman and Nicobar Islands believe in a religion that can be described as a form of monotheistic animism. The tribal people of these islands believe that Puluga is the only deity and is responsible for everything happening on Earth. The faith of the Andamanese teaches that Puluga resides on the Andaman and Nicobar Islands' Saddle Peak. People try to avoid any action that might displease Puluga. People belonging to this religion believe in the presence of souls, ghosts, and spirits. They put a lot of emphasis on dreams. They let dreams decide different courses of action in their lives.

Andamanese mythology held that human males emerged from split bamboo, whereas women were fashioned from clay. One version found by Alfred Reginald Radcliffe-Brown held that the first man died and went to heaven, a pleasurable world, but this blissful period ended due to breaking a food taboo, specifically eating the forbidden vegetables in the Puluga's garden. Thus catastrophe ensued, and eventually the people grew overpopulated and didn't follow Puluga's laws. Hence, there was a Great Flood that left four survivors, who lost their fire.

Other religions practiced in the Andaman and Nicobar Islands are, in order of size, Hinduism, Christianity, Islam, Sikhism, Buddhism, Jainism and Baháʼí Faith.

== Government ==
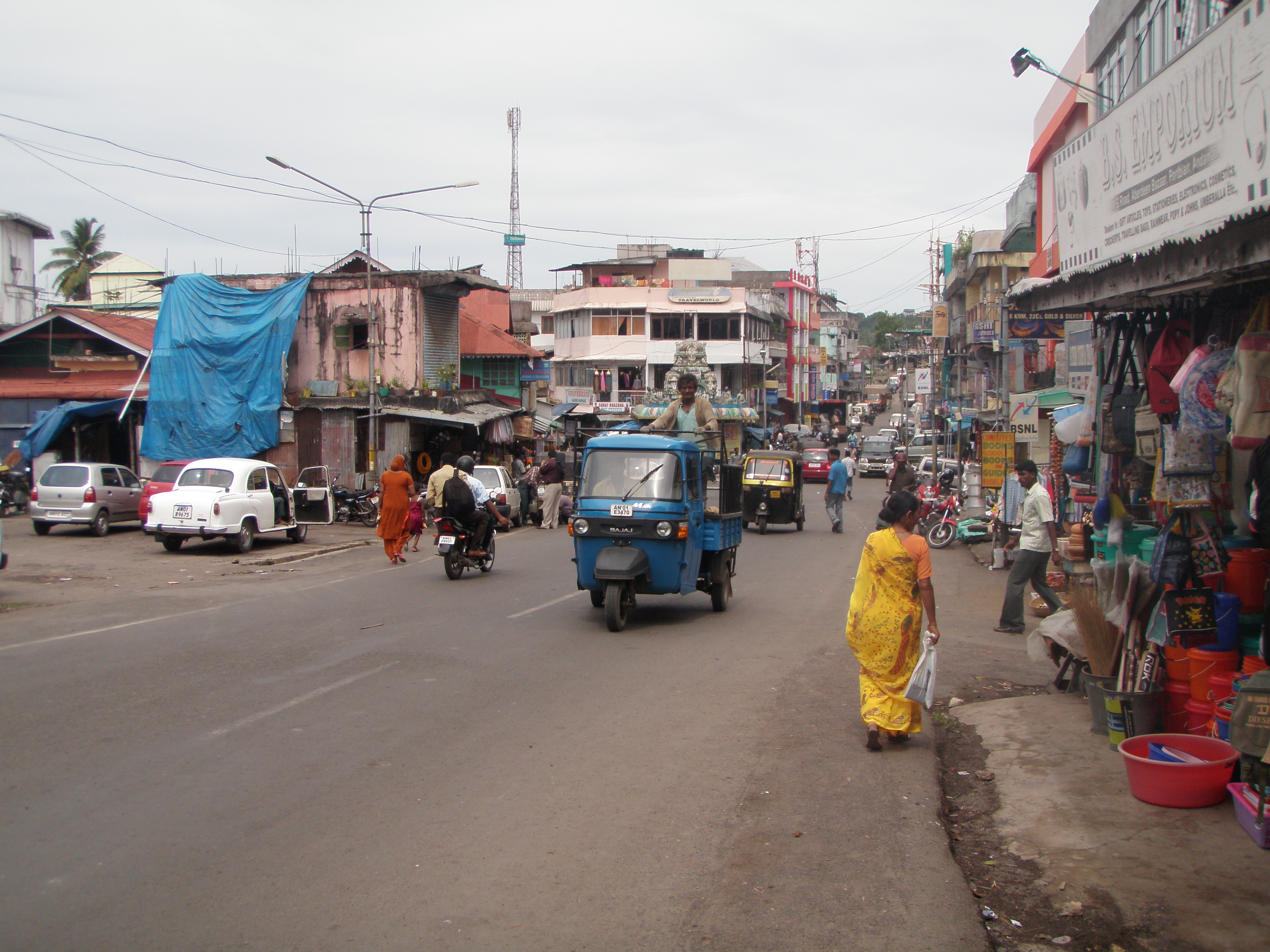
The capital city of the Andaman Islands, Port Blair

Port Blair, also known as Sri Vijaya Puram is the chief community on the islands, and the administrative centre of the Union Territory. The Andaman Islands form a single administrative district within the Union Territory, the Andaman district (the Nicobar Islands were separated and established as the new Nicobar district in 1974).

== Transportation ==
The only commercial airport is Veer Savarkar International Airport in Port Blair. The airport is under the control of the Indian Navy. Prior to 2016 only daylight operations were allowed; since 2016 night flights have also operated. A small airstrip, about 1,000 metres (3,300 ft) long, is located near the eastern shore of North Andaman near Diglipur.

There are also ships from Chennai, Visakhapatnam and Kolkata.

== Cultural references ==
=== Literature ===
The islands are prominently featured in Arthur Conan Doyle's Sherlock Holmes 1890 mystery The Sign of the Four. The magistrate in Lady Gregory's play Spreading the News had formerly served in the islands.

M. M. Kaye's 1985 novel Death in the Andamans and Marianne Wiggins' 1989 novel John Dollar are set in the islands. The latter begins with an expedition from Burma to celebrate King George's birthday, but turns into a grim survival story after an earthquake and tsunami.

A principal character in the novel Six Suspects by Vikas Swarup is from the Andaman Islands. The main protagonist of William Boyd's 2018 novel Love is Blind, spends time in the Andaman Islands at the turn of the 20th century. The Andaman Islands in the period before, during and just after the Second World War are the setting for Uzma Aslan Khan's The Miraculous True History of Nomi Ali.

=== Film and television ===
Priyadarshan's 1996 film Kaalapani (Malayalam; Sirai Chaalai in Tamil) depicts the Indian freedom struggle and the lives of prisoners in the Cellular Jail in Port Blair.

In 2023, Andaman islands were featured in a Netflix series named Kaala Paani based on a fictional disease outbreak in 2027.

== See also ==
- Andaman and Nicobar Islands
- List of endemic birds of the Andaman and Nicobar Islands
- List of reptiles and amphibians of the Andaman and Nicobar Islands
- List of mammals of the Andaman and Nicobar Islands
- List of trees of the Andaman Islands
- Lists of islands
- North and Middle Andaman
- South Andaman
- South Andaman island
