= Mayabunder =

Mayabunder Ret Phor Mayabandar
- Location in the Andaman and Nicobar Islands, and in the Bay of Bengal Mayabunder (Bay of Bengal)
- Coordinates: 12.9333°N 92.9333°E
- Country: India
- Union Territory: Andaman and Nicobar Islands
- District: North and Middle Andaman

Population (2001)
  - Total: 23,912

Languages
  - Official: English and Hindi
- Time zone: UTC+5:30 (IST)
- PIN: 744204
- Vehicle registration: AN 01
- Sex ratio: 925 ♂/♀
- Literacy: 84.25%
- Climate: Am

Mayabunder is a town and a tehsil in the northern part of Middle Andaman Island, Andaman Archipelago, India. The name is also spelled Maya Bunder or Maya Bandar. As of 2001, the county had 23,912 inhabitants, of which 3182 were in the town. It was settled in the British colonial period by immigrants from Myanmar and ex-convicts from Mainland India.

Administratively, Mayabunder is the headquarters of the North and Middle Andaman district, which is part of the Andaman and Nicobar Islands territory.

== Demographics ==
Bengali is the most spoken language in Mayabunder tehsil. As of 2011 census, Bengali is spoken as the first language by 41.42 per cent of the tehsil's population. Largest language's population are

Bengali 10,682

Sadri 2,787

Hindi 2,343

Telugu 2,224

Kurukh 1,686

Tamil 1,735

Malayalam 718

Kharia 665

Munda 520.

Mayabunder tehsil in 2011 census
1. Bengali (41.4%)
2. Sadri (10.8%)
3. Hindi (9.08%)
4. Telugu (8.62%)
5. Tamil (6.73%)
6. Kurukh (6.54%)
7. Malalyalam (2.78%)
8. Kharia (2.58%)
9. Munda (2.02%)
10. others (9.42%)

== Geography ==
Mayabunder is linked with Port Blair by the Andaman Trunk Road (242 km) and by ferry (136 km).

Climate data for Mayabunder (1991–2020, extremes 1952–2020)
| Month | Jan | Feb | Mar | Apr | May | Jun | Jul | Aug | Sep | Oct | Nov | Dec | Year |
|---|---|---|---|---|---|---|---|---|---|---|---|---|---|
| Record high °C (°F) | 33.9 (93.0) | 34.7 (94.5) | 35.6 (96.1) | 39.0 (102.2) | 38.8 (101.8) | 36.2 (97.2) | 35.4 (95.7) | 35.6 (96.1) | 35.2 (95.4) | 33.6 (92.5) | 37.5 (99.5) | 38.5 (101.3) | 39.0 (102.2) |
| Mean daily maximum °C (°F) | 29.2 (84.6) | 29.8 (85.6) | 31.4 (88.5) | 32.7 (90.9) | 31.7 (89.1) | 30.0 (86.0) | 29.8 (85.6) | 29.5 (85.1) | 29.3 (84.7) | 30.1 (86.2) | 30.3 (86.5) | 29.4 (84.9) | 30.3 (86.5) |
| Mean daily minimum °C (°F) | 22.2 (72.0) | 22.3 (72.1) | 23.1 (73.6) | 24.9 (76.8) | 24.9 (76.8) | 24.4 (75.9) | 24.0 (75.2) | 24.3 (75.7) | 23.8 (74.8) | 23.9 (75.0) | 24.3 (75.7) | 23.5 (74.3) | 23.8 (74.8) |
| Record low °C (°F) | 16.8 (62.2) | 16.7 (62.1) | 18.2 (64.8) | 18.8 (65.8) | 17.2 (63.0) | 19.4 (66.9) | 19.2 (66.6) | 20.1 (68.2) | 20.5 (68.9) | 20.0 (68.0) | 19.8 (67.6) | 19.3 (66.7) | 16.7 (62.1) |
| Average rainfall mm (inches) | 37.4 (1.47) | 1.7 (0.07) | 10.6 (0.42) | 71.6 (2.82) | 343.4 (13.52) | 541.8 (21.33) | 511.3 (20.13) | 540.6 (21.28) | 568.6 (22.39) | 306.2 (12.06) | 175.2 (6.90) | 76.9 (3.03) | 3,185.5 (125.41) |
| Average rainy days | 0.9 | 0.4 | 1.1 | 2.5 | 13.0 | 18.0 | 18.8 | 19.3 | 18.3 | 12.8 | 7.2 | 3.2 | 115.5 |
| Average relative humidity (%) (at 17:30 IST) | 79 | 77 | 74 | 76 | 82 | 87 | 87 | 88 | 89 | 87 | 84 | 81 | 83 |
Source: India Meteorological Department

== Economy and facilities ==
Mayabunder is a waystation for several tourist attractions, such as mangrove lined tidal creeks, the beach at Aves Island (Andaman and Nicobar Islands) (30 minutes by boat), and Karamatang Beach (13 km), a sea turtle nesting ground. Port Blair and Mayabunder are the only ports that can harbour passenger ships from mainland India.

Mayabunder has a public college named Mahatma Gandhi Government College.

On 24 December 2012, Indian Coast Guard Station Mayabunder, the first CG Station in the North Andaman Islands was commissioned by the Defence Secretary, Shri Shashi Kant Sharma.

== Villages ==
According to the 2001 census, Mayabunder county includes the following villages:

- Asha Nagar (83 inhabitants)
- Bajato (74)
- Bamboo Nallaha (67)
- Basantipur (370)
- Birsa Nagar (180)
- Buddha Nallaha (179)
- Chainpur (452)
- Chappa Nali (29)
- Chuglum Gum (140)
- Danpur (592)
- Devpur (450)
- Dukennagar (691)
- Ganeshpur (56)
- Govindpur (664)
- Hanspuri (280)
- Harinagar (1809)
- Jaipur (461)
- Kamalapur (241)
- Kanchi Nallaha & Bamboo Nallaha (77)
- Karanch Khari (68)
- Karmatang (1637)
- Khukari Tabla (70)
- Lataw (179)
- Lauki Nallaha (847)
- Lucknow (686)
- Luis-in-Let-Bay (6)
- Mayabunder (3182)
- Pahalgaon (1326)
- Paiket Bay (226)
- Paresh Nagar (516)
- Pinakinagar (829)
- Pokadera (1840)
- Profullya Nagar (377)
- Pudumadurai (391)
- Rampur (765)
- Santipur (882)
- Shippi Tikry (118)
- Sundari Khari (79)
- Swadesh Nagar (766)
- Tugapur (1733)
- Webi (476)
