= Wilson Island (Ritchie's Archipelago) =

Island of the Andaman Islands

Nickname: Sir Archdale Wilson Island
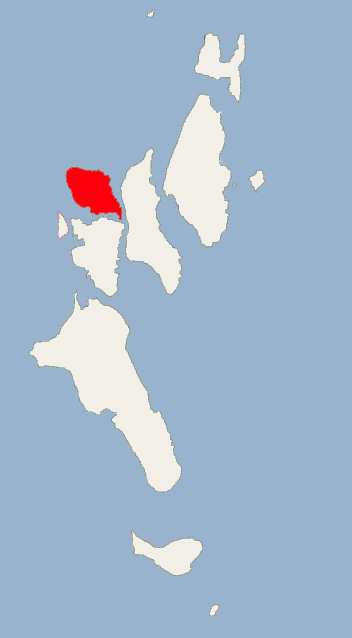
- Location of Wilson Island in Ritchie's Archipelago

- Location of Wilson Island in Andaman and Nicobar Islands Wilson Island (Ritchie's Archipelago) (India)

Geography
- Location: Bay of Bengal
- Coordinates: 12.13°N 92.98°E
- Archipelago: Andaman Islands
- Adjacent to: Indian Ocean
- Area: 14.3 km^{2} (5.5 sq mi)
- Length: 4.1 km (2.55 mi)
- Width: 4.3 km (2.67 mi)
- Coastline: 16.2 km (10.07 mi)
- Highest elevation: 216 m (709 ft)
- Highest point: Round Hill

Administration
- India
- District: South Andaman
- Island group: Andaman Islands
- Island sub-group: Ritchie's Archipelago
- Tehsil: Port Blair Tehsil

Demographics
- Population: 0 (2011)

Additional information
- Time zone: IST (UTC+5:30)
- PIN: 744202
- Telephone code: 031927
- ISO code: IN-AN-00
- Official website: www.and.nic.in

Wilson Island is an island of the Andaman Islands. It belongs to the South Andaman administrative district, part of the Indian union territory of the Andaman and Nicobar Islands. The island lies 57 km (35 mi) northeast of Port Blair.

== Etymology ==
Wilson Island is named after Brigadier Commander Sir Archdale Wilson.

== History ==
There is a lighthouse on the island. It was commissioned on 23 March 1994.

== Geography ==
The island belongs to the Ritchie's Archipelago and is located between north of Sir William Peel Island and Nicholson Island and west of John Lawrence Island. A narrow channel (400 m (1,312 ft)) separates Wilson Island from Sir William Peel Island to the south.

== Administration ==
Politically, Wilson Island is part of Port Blair taluk.

== Demographics ==
The island is uninhabited.

== Image gallery ==
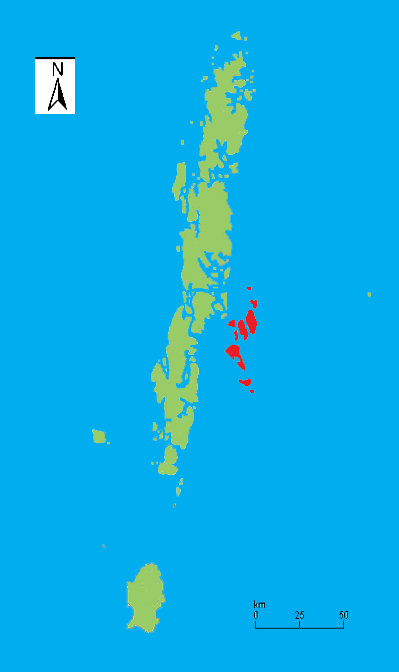
Outline map of the Andaman Islands, with Ritchie's Archipelago highlighted (in red).
