= Havelock Island =

Island of the Andaman Islands

Swaraj Dweep
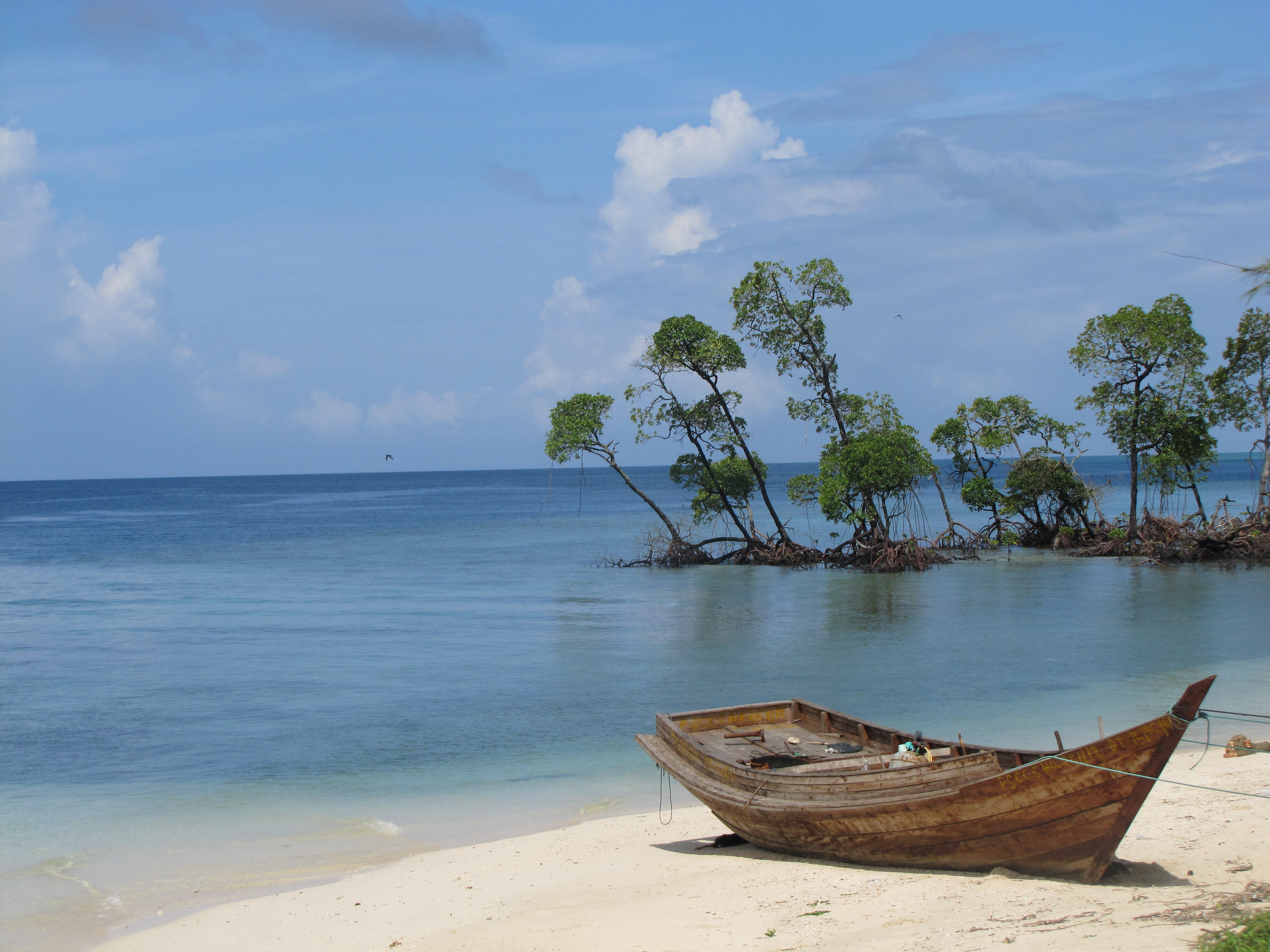
- A view of a beach in Havelock Island

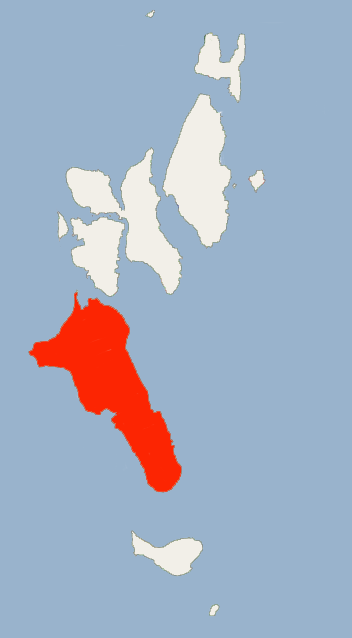
- Location of Havelock Island in Ritchie's Archipelago

- Location of Havelock Island in Andaman and Nicobar Islands

Geography
- Location: Bay of Bengal
- Coordinates: 11.96°N 93.00°E
- Archipelago: Andaman Islands
- Adjacent to: Indian Ocean
- Total islands: 1
- Major islands: Swaraaj Dweep
- Area: 92.2 km^{2} (35.6 sq mi)
- Length: 18 km (11.2 mi)
- Width: 8 km (5 mi)
- Coastline: 58.5 km (36.35 mi)
- Highest elevation: 167 m (548 ft)
- Highest point: Yulutang

Administration
- India
- District: South Andaman
- Island group: Andaman Islands
- Island sub-group: Ritchie's Archipelago
- Tehsil: Ritchie's Archipelago Tehsil
- Largest settlement: Govinda Nagar

Demographics
- Population: 6,351 (2011)
- Pop. density: 68.5/km^{2} (177.4/sq mi)
- Ethnic groups: Bengali

Additional information
- Time zone: IST (UTC+5:30)
- PIN: 744211
- Telephone code: 031928
- Official website: www.and.nic.in
- Literacy: 84.4%
- Avg. summer temperature: 30.2 °C (86.4 °F)
- Avg. winter temperature: 23.0 °C (73.4 °F)
- Sex ratio: 1.2♂/♀
- Census code: 35.639.0004
- Official languages: Bengali, Hindi, English

Havelock Island, officially known as Swaraj Dweep (transl. Independence Island), is one of the largest islands in Ritchie's Archipelago, to the east of Great Andaman within the Andaman Islands of India. It belongs to the South Andaman administrative district, part of the Indian union territory of Andaman and Nicobar Islands. The island is 41 km (25 mi) northeast of the capital city, Port Blair.

== Etymology ==
Havelock Island was previously named after a British general, Sir Henry Havelock, who served in India.

In December 2018, the Indian Prime Minister, Narendra Modi renamed it as 'Swaraj Dweep' as a tribute to Subhas Chandra Bose. Bose had hoisted the Indian flag at Port Blair on 30 December 1943 and proclaimed the Andaman and Nicobar Islands as liberated from British rule. He had subsequently named Neil Island as Shaheed Dweep and Ross Island was renamed as Netaji Subhas Chandra Bose Dweep as well.

== History ==
In the Swaraj Dweep and Long Island, the vast majority of settlers at Shaheed Dweep were refugees from erstwhile East Pakistan, following the genocide and exodus of Hindu Bangladeshis prior to that country's war of independence in 1971. Havelock Island avoided much of the devastation by the 2004 Indian Ocean earthquake and its resulting tsunami and there were no documented casualties.

Havelock Island is one of the few places that the administration of the Andaman and Nicobar Islands union territory of India has permitted and encouraged development of tourism, with a focus on promoting eco-tourism. There is a lighthouse at the northern point of the island, near Govinda Nagar, established in the year 2005.

== Geography ==
The island belongs to the Ritchie's Archipelago and is located between Peel Island and Neil Island.

== Administration ==
Politically, Havelock Island is part of Port Blair taluk.

== Demographics ==
The island's population of 6,351 (as of 2011) consists of mainly Bengali settlers. Many of these settlers have East Bengali origin as these people were given settlement by the Indian government after the Partition of India in 1947.

The six villages are:

- Govinda Nagar 2,940
- Vejoy Nagar (inc. Kalapathar) 1,099
- Shyam Nagar 856
- Krishna Nagar 719
- Radha Nagar 637
- Road between Shyam Nagar and Krishna Nagar 100

== Tourism ==
As the premier tourism hub of the archipelago, Swaraj Dweep attracts a massive volume of international and domestic travelers, centered primarily around Radhanagar Beach (Beach No. 7), which is globally renowned for its white sands and pristine sunsets. The island serves as the primary epicenter for marine adventure sports in India, featuring numerous certified PADI and SSI scuba diving schools that utilize prominent dive sites like Dixon's Pinnacle. Beyond diving, the local tourism economy thrives on luxury beach resorts, sea walking activities, kayaking through mangrove creeks, and day trips to Elephant Beach for snorkeling.

- Beaches
  - Radhanagar Beach on the western coast, also known as Number 7 Beach, is one of the most popular beaches on Havelock Island and was named "Best Beach in Asia" by Time in 2004. Radhanagar beach also bagged the prestigious blue flag certification in 2020. A Blue Flag beach is an eco-tourism model endeavouring to provide the tourists or beachgoers clean and hygienic bathing water, facilities, safe and healthy environment. Other notable beaches include Elephant Beach on the northwest coast and Vijay Nagar Beach (No. 5), Beach No. 3 and Beach No. 1 on the east coast. Kalapathar is another famous beach.
  - Elephant Beach: To reach Elephant beach one needs to take a boat from Havelock Island jetty. Another way to reach Elephant beach is via trekking. The major 3 beaches at Havelock Island are namely Radhanagar Beach, Elephant Beach and Kalapathar beach.

== Transportation ==
The island's transportation infrastructure is anchored by regular government and high-speed private catamaran ferries, such as Makruzz and Nautika, which connect it to Sri Vijaya Puram and Shaheed Dweep via the main Govind Nagar Jetty. Locally, transport is dominated by auto-rickshaws, public buses, and a robust rental market for scooters and bicycles operating along its main numbered arterial roads. The local administration has also introduced electric buses to promote eco-friendly transit.

- Air - Pawan Hans: Island's existing helipad manages emergency medical evacuations and subsidized helicopter services run by Pawan Hans.
- Bus: A local bus connects the jetty and villages on an hourly circuit. Private ferries that sail to Havelock Island are Makruzz, Green Ocean, Nautika, Nautika Lite and ITT Majestic these cruises have different sailing time and schedule from Port Blair to Havelock Island and from Neil Island to Havelock Island. The ferry sailing to Havelock Island is subject to weather conditions.
- Seaport: The island can be reached from Port Blair by government-operated ferries and private cruises. There are also helicopter services. There are 2-3 government operating ferries in a day. Travelers typically take the ferry service from Port Blair to Havelock Island, Havelock Island to Neil Island (Shaheed Dweep) and Neil Island to Port Blair There are private cruise ships such as Makruzz, Green Ocean, Nautika and ITT Majestic.
- Water aerodrome terminal: India has 4 water aerodrome terminals in the Andaman and Nicobar Islands for the civilian seaplane services under the government’s regional connectivity scheme (UDAN), at (listed north to south) Long Island, Swaraj Dweep (formerly Havelock Island), Shaheed Dweep (formerly Neil Island), and Hutbay (Little Andaman).

== Gallery ==
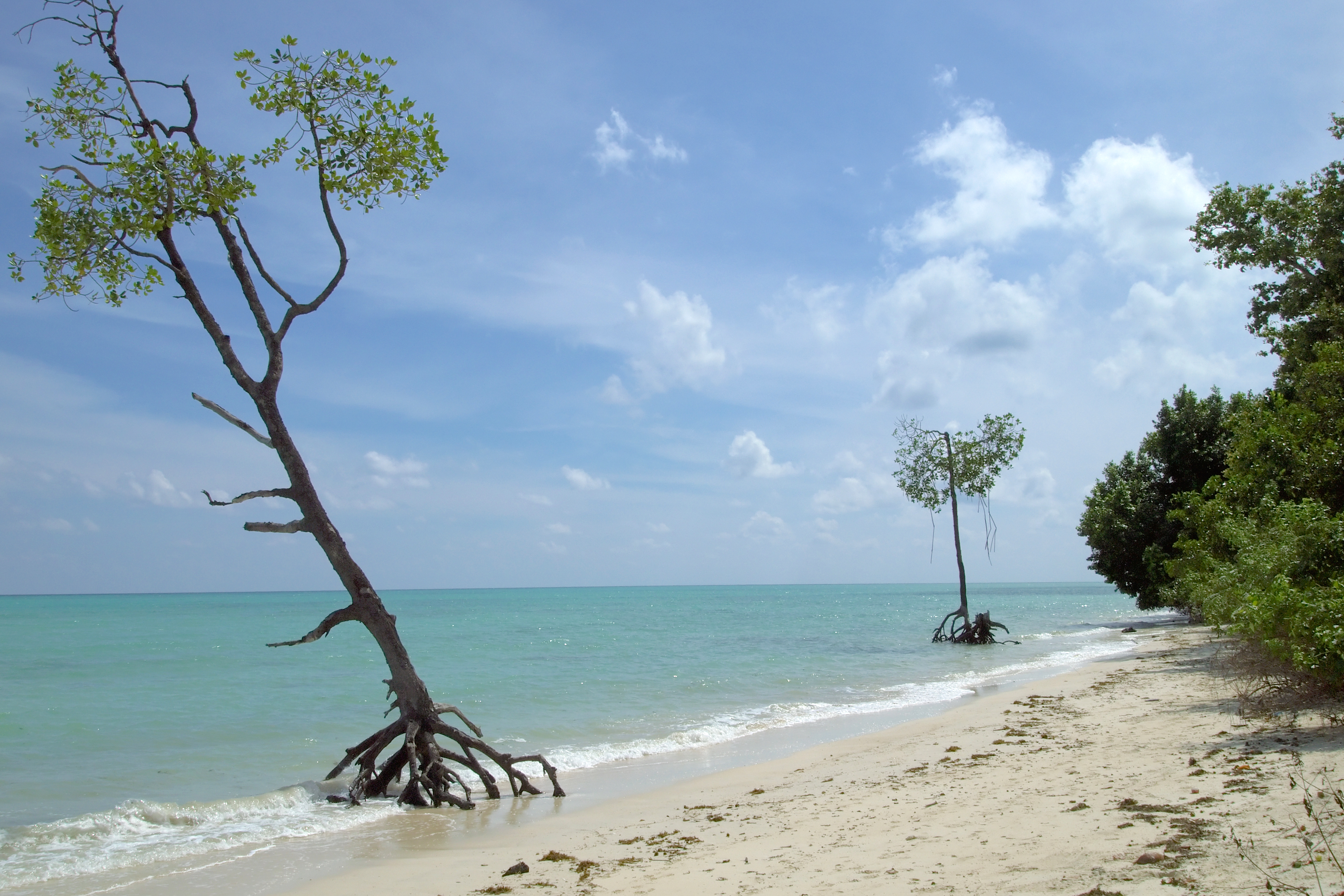
Mangrove trees, East side

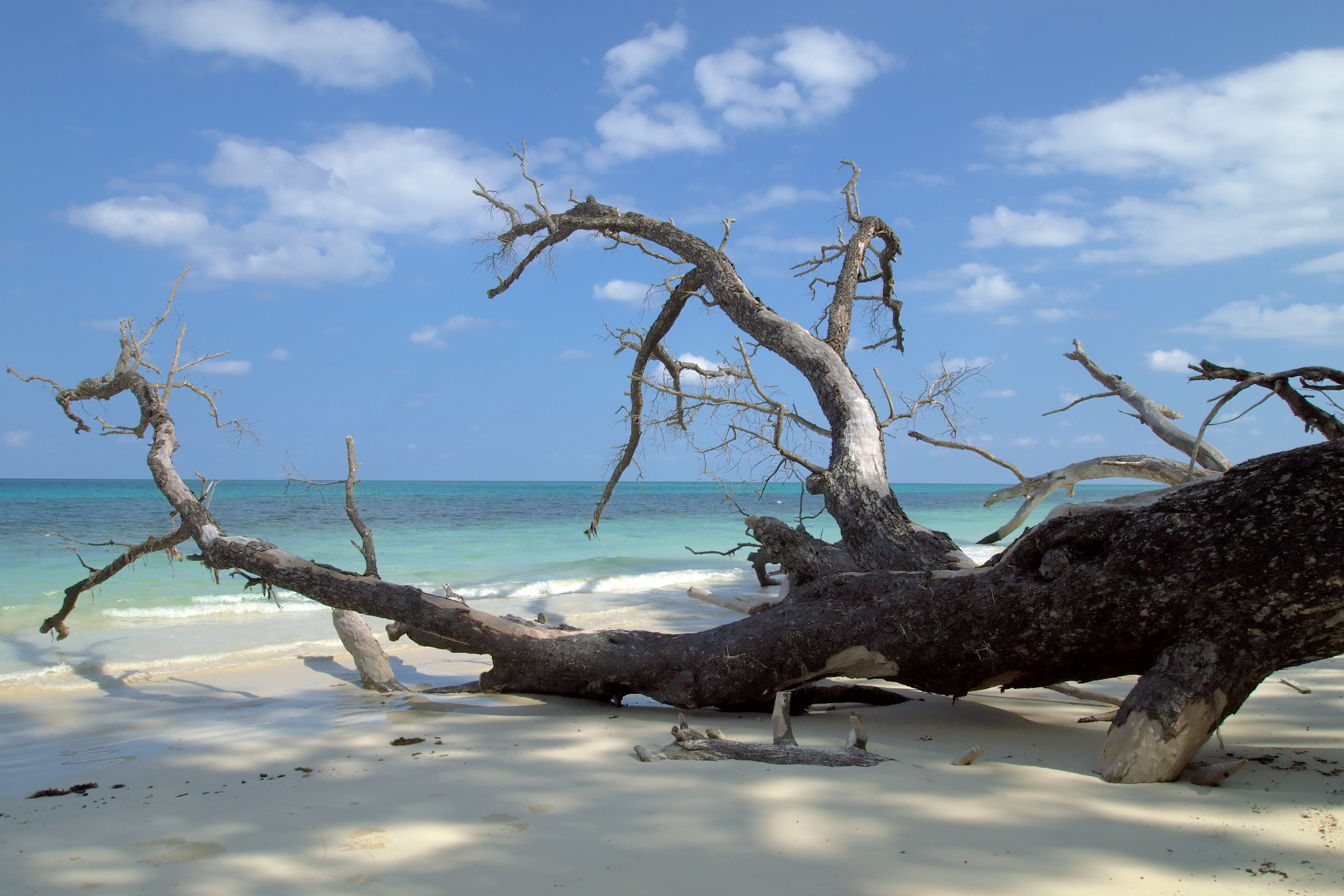
Trees on the beach, East side

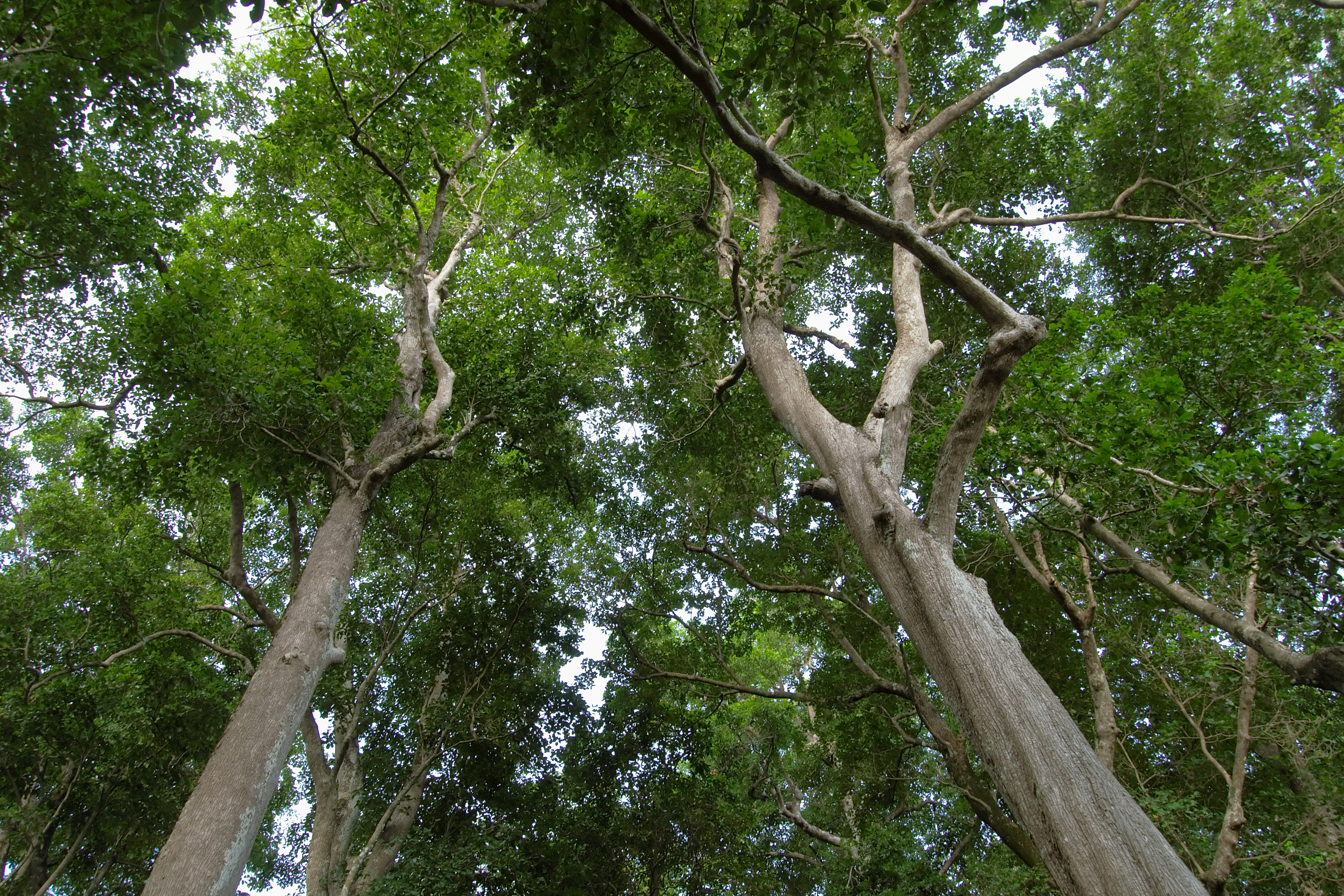
Canopy of tropical rainforest

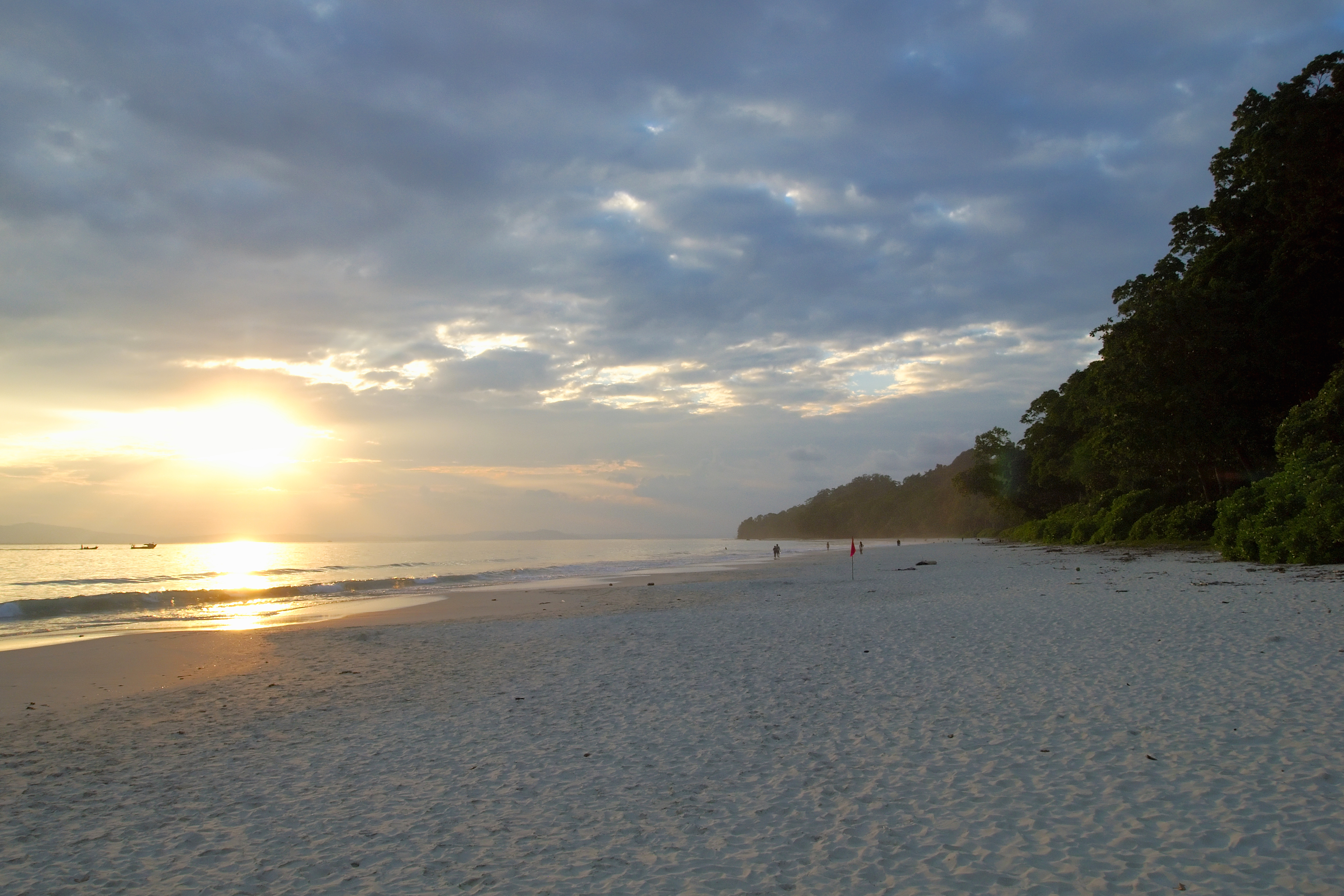
Sunset on the beach

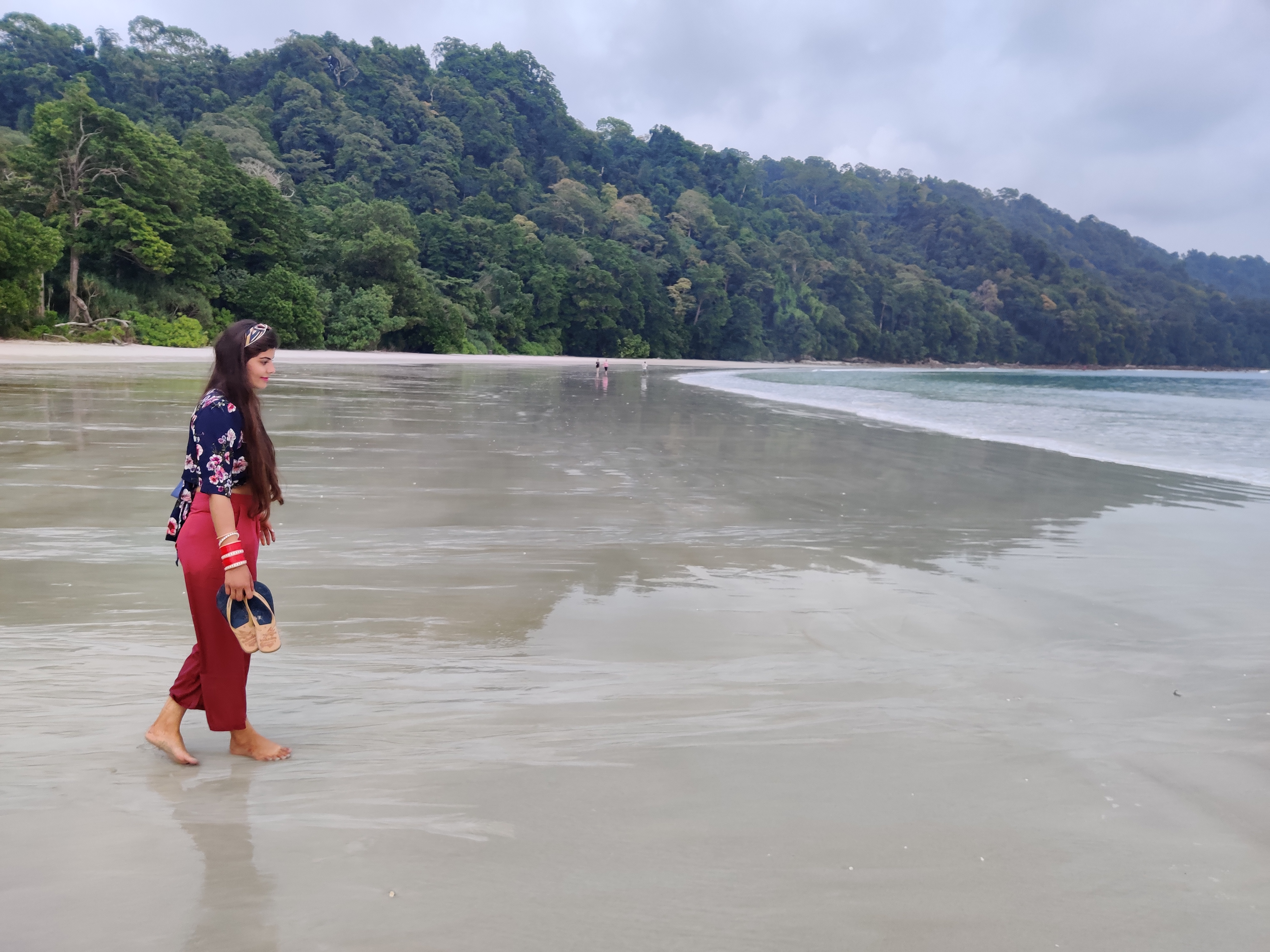
Radha Nagar Beach, Havelock Island

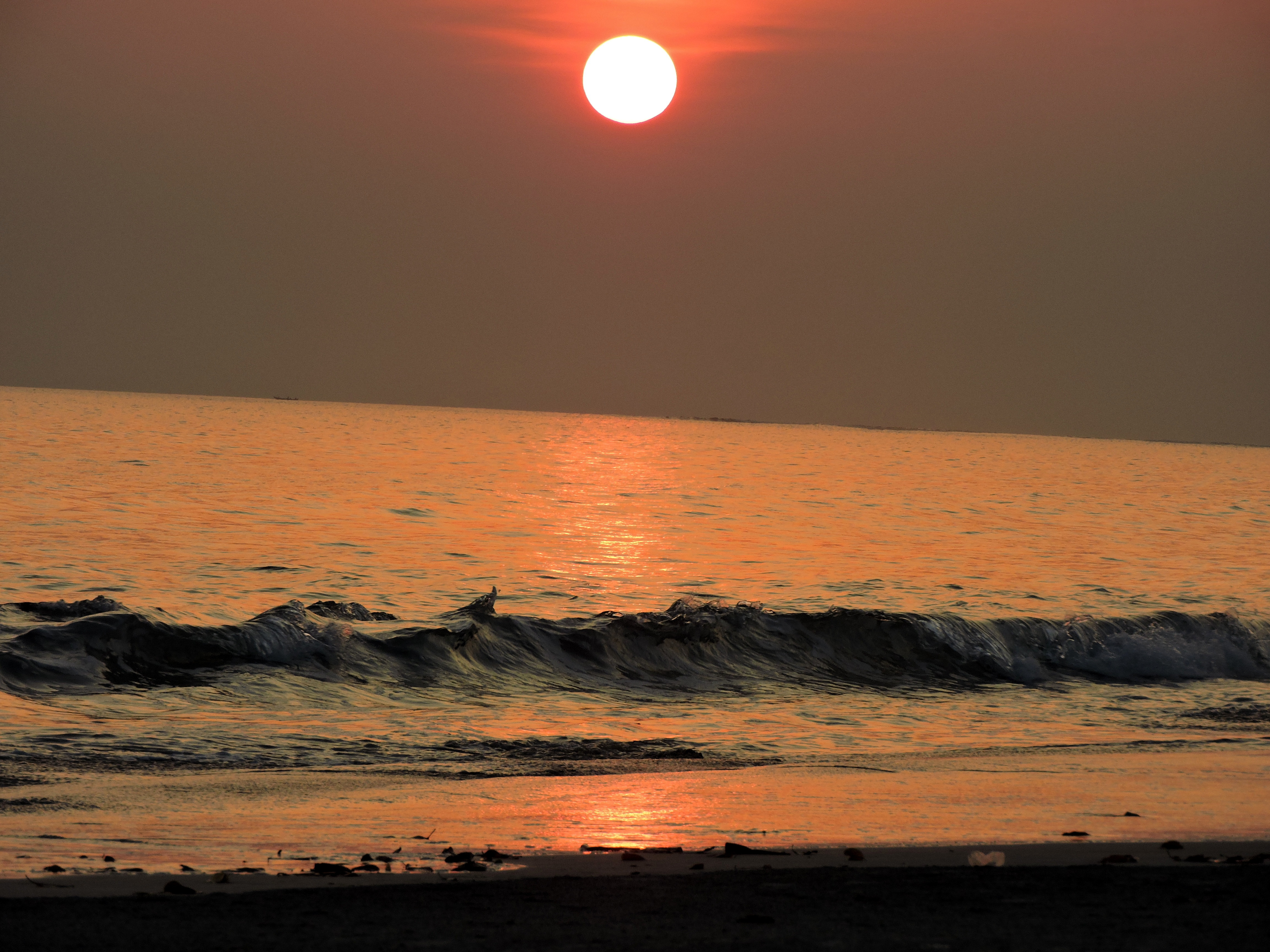
Radha Nagar Beach sunset view

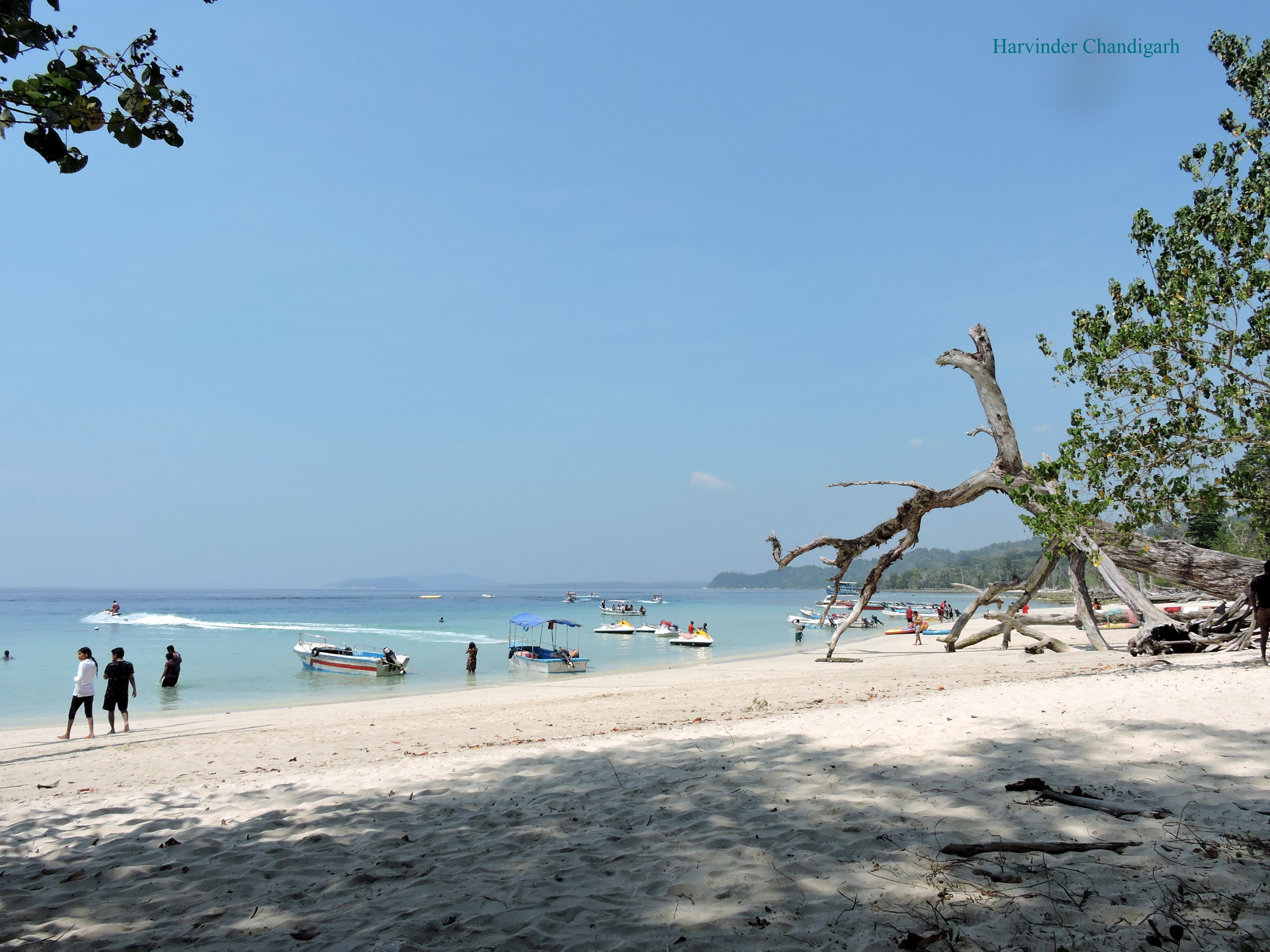
Elephant Beach, Havelock Island

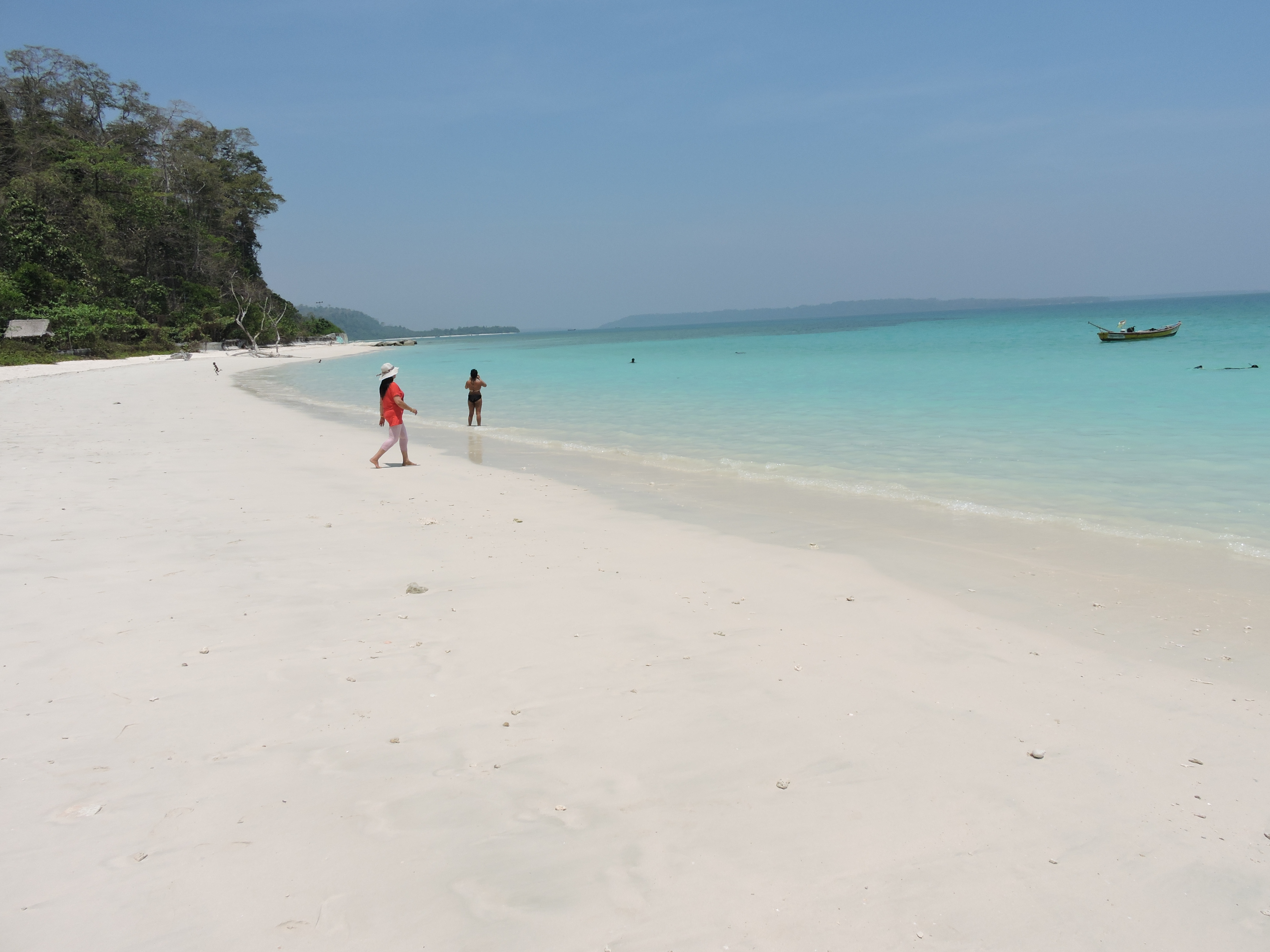
Kalapathar Beach

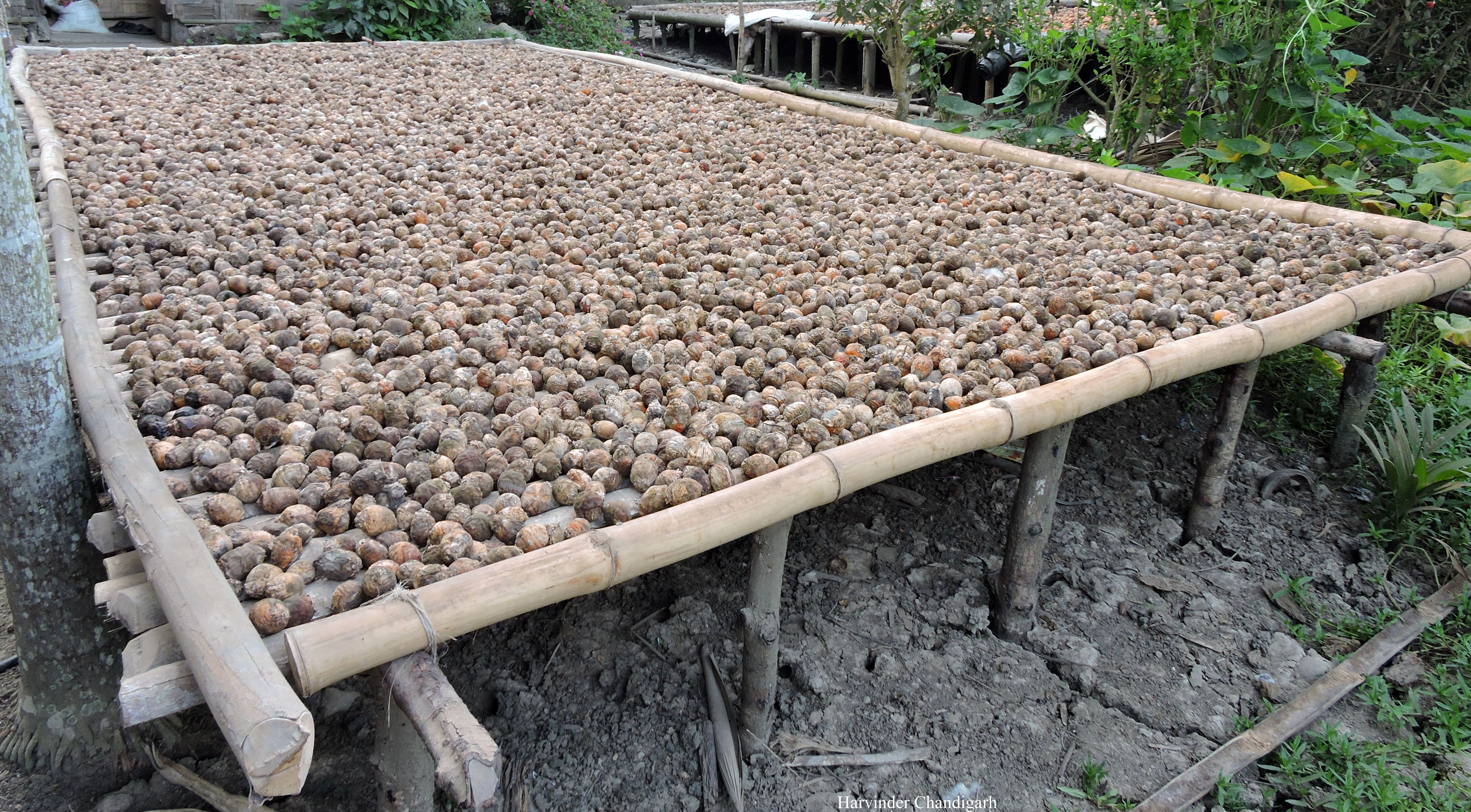
Prominent horticulture produce of Havelock

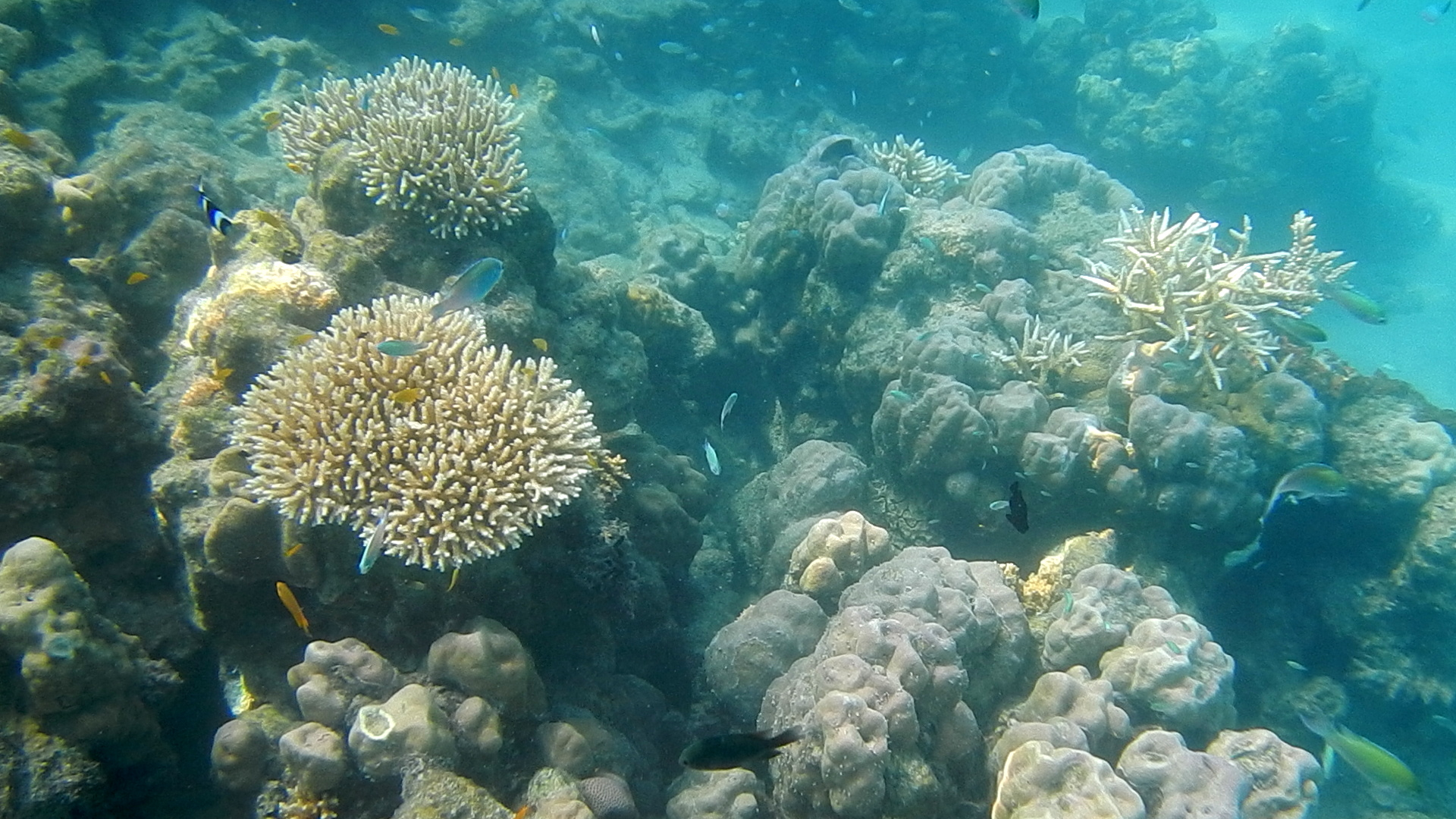
Coral reef Elephant Beach

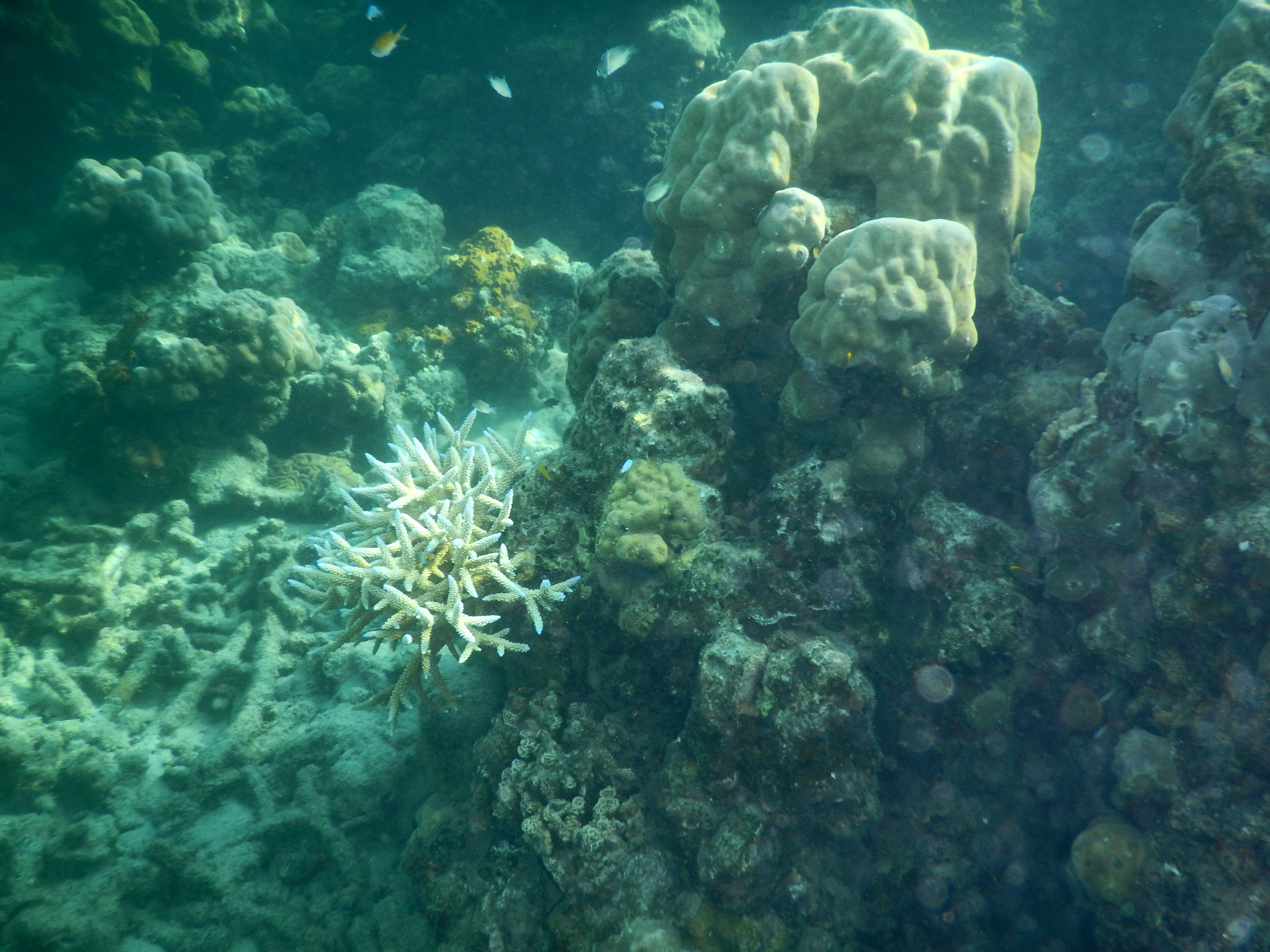
Coral reef Elephant Beach

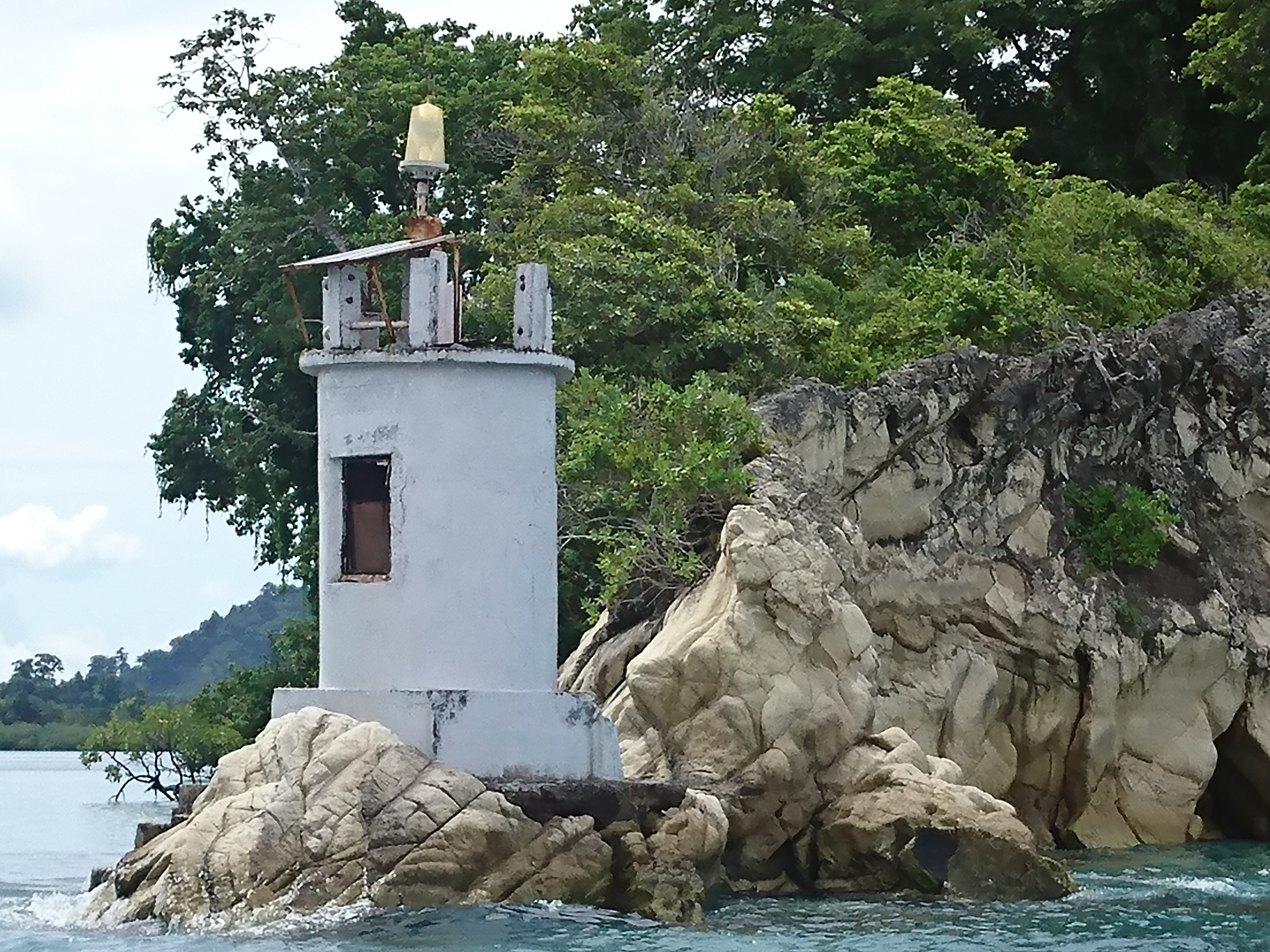
Havelock Light House

== See also ==
- Tourism in the Andaman and Nicobar Islands
- Tourism in India
