= Ritchie's Archipelago =

Part of the Andaman and Nicobar Islands

Nickname: John Ritchie's Archipelago
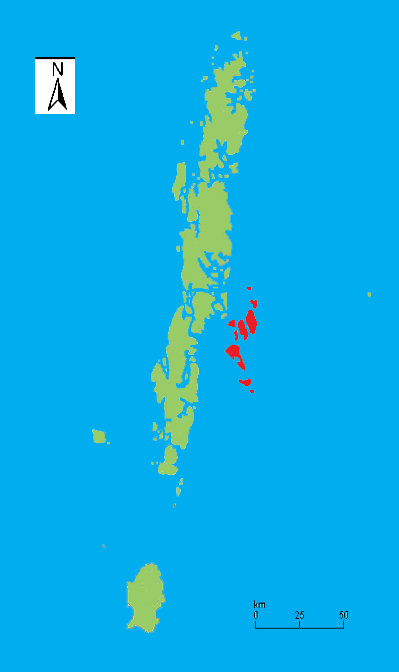
- Location in Andaman Islands

- Location within Andaman and Nicobar Islands Location within India

Geography
- Location: Bay of Bengal
- Coordinates: 12.05°N 93.02°E
- Archipelago: Andaman Islands
- Adjacent to: Indian Ocean
- Total islands: 20
- Major islands: Swaraj Island; Henry Lawrence Island; John Lawrence Island; Sir William Peel Island; Shaheed Island
- Area: 252.1 km^{2} (97.3 sq mi)
- Highest elevation: 216 m (709 ft)
- Highest point: Round Hill, Wilson Island

Administration
- India
- District: South Andaman
- Island group: Andaman Islands
- Tehsil: Ritchie's Archipelago Tehsil
- Largest settlement: Govinda Nagar

Demographics
- Population: 9355 (2011)
- Pop. density: 37.1/km^{2} (96.1/sq mi)
- Ethnic groups: Bengali Hindu, Andamanese

Additional information
- Time zone: IST (UTC+5:30)
- PIN: 7442xx
- Telephone code: 031927
- ISO code: IN-AN-00
- Official website: www.and.nic.in
- Literacy: 84.4%
- Avg. summer temperature: 30.2 °C (86.4 °F)
- Avg. winter temperature: 23.0 °C (73.4 °F)
- Sex ratio: 1.2♂/♀
- Census Code: 35.639.0004
- Official Languages: Hindi, English

Ritchie's Archipelago is a cluster of smaller islands which lie 20 km (12 mi) east of Great Andaman, the main island group of the Andaman Islands. The Islands belong to the South Andaman administrative district, part of the Indian union territory of Andaman and Nicobar Islands.

== Etymology ==
The archipelago is named after an 18th-century British marine surveyor, John Ritchie, who spent nearly two decades in the employ of the Council of Bengal charting and documenting the Andaman's and surrounding regions. The individual islands are largely named after British generals and civil officials serving in India at the time of the Indian Rebellion of 1857.

Of the archipelago which now bears his name, Ritchie's accounts and maps were the first reliable sources of information on the islands, which until then were very sketchily known to Europeans. Ritchie was one who championed that the British administration in India make further investigation and use of the Andamans. During Ritchie's time these entreaties were largely ignored. Perhaps frustrated and disillusioned after years of thankless work under difficult circumstances, Ritchie requested to be returned for home leave, which he was in 1787. An extract from his parting note to his superiors explained:

"The condition of my health being such as requires an immediate change of climate... after a series of 19 years continuous service in the office of Marine Surveyor, I hope there is no impropriety in my requesting the favour, also... to continue my allowance to me... It is a small salary, and the receipt of it has been the only advantage I have ever reaped from the Company's service, and because my Line of Service, from its singularity, has had no gradation of advancement... whilst its Duties have been uncommonly severe, uncommonly hazardous, and equally unprofitable; for what advantage could be obtained from tracking a Labyrinth of Woods and Rivers? Or from exploring the Shoals of a shelving and broken Sea Coast? All of which uninhabited, and seldom visited, except perhaps in the disastrous case of shipwreck... In the meantime it has been from my Labours, that the Hon'ble Company have obtained all authentic knowledge of the Sea Coast and Tide Rivers of their possessions in Bengal, together with other services more important and beneficial."

Two years after Ritchie's departure, an attempt was made to set up a colony in the Andamans, but this was aborted after only a few years. It was not until 1867 that a permanent European presence was established, when the whole islands were annexed by the British and a penal colony established at Netaji Subhash Chandra Bose Island (Ross Island) on South Andaman Island.

== Geography ==
The islands are located in the Bay of Bengal, bordering with the Andaman Sea and are some 400 km (250 mi) south of the nearest Asian mainland, Cape Negrais in Myanmar. The archipelago comprises 4 larger islands, 3 medium islands, and 10 smaller islands and islets, extending in a roughly north–south chain, parallel to the main Great Andaman group. Baratang Island and South Andaman Island lie to the west across Diligent Strait; the active volcano Barren Island is 85 km (53 mi) further to the east.

The islands of Ritchie's Archipelago run in a closely spaced arc which extends about 60 km (37 mi) from the southernmost Rose Island. to North Button I., with Diligent Strait between them and Great Andaman ranging from 30 km (19 mi) to less than 10 km (6.2 mi). Most of the islands are clustered closely together separated by only narrow, almost river-like channels. The exceptions are Rose Island and Neill Island to the south of Havelock Island, and the three small Button Islands which are smaller outliers to the north of the group.

The interior of most of the islands consists of undulating hills and plains, with a topography generally not exceeding 100 m (330 ft) above mean sea level. Wilson Island rises to 216 m. Occasionally the land rises reasonably abruptly from the sea to a domed plateau, and there are a few rocky coastal cliffs; however, in the main the coastlines are relatively flat, interspersed by both rocky and sand beaches and some low-lying lagoons and estuaries on the larger islands. Coral reefs surround many of the islands, particularly on the "sea-ward" (i.e., eastern) coastlines.

Havelock, John Lawrence, Henry Lawrence, Peel and Outram islands have a few tidal creeks winding into their interiors; in general freshwater streams are few.

=== Islands ===
The main islands in the archipelago are:

- Swaraj Dweep (Havelock Island) - 92.2 km^{2} (35.6 sq mi)
- Sir William Peel Island (Peel Island) - 23.7 km^{2} (9.2 sq mi)
- Nicholson Island
- Wilson Island - 14.3 km^{2} (5.5 sq mi)
- John Lawrence Island - 34.8 km^{2} (13.4 sq mi), formerly inhabited
- Henry Lawrence Island - 54.7 km^{2} (21.1 sq mi)
- Inglis Island
- Outram Island - 13.9 km^{2} (5.4 sq mi)
- Shaheed Dweep (Neil Island) - 13.7 km^{2} (5.3 sq mi)
- Sir Hugh Rose Island (Rose Island)
- Button Islands (North Button Island, Middle Button Island and South Button Island)

== Administration ==
Politically, Ritchie's Archipelago is part of Port Blair Taluk.

== Demographics ==
The islands were originally populated by the indigenous Great Andamanese peoples, in particular the tribal and linguistic grouping known as Aka-Bale. However, as the populations of the various Andamanese indigenous peoples declined greatly in the decades following the establishment of colonial settlements by the British Raj (and later, independent India), the indigenous communities of these islands have vanished. The present population of the islands consists of immigrant Indian and a few Karen (Burmese) settlers. The 2011 census of India reported 9,355 people living on two inhabited islands of Ritchie's Archipelago: Havelock Island and Neill Island.

== Transportation ==
Port Blair, is located approximately 40 km (25 mi) to the southwest of the archipelago, accessible via a 3-5 hour ferry trip.

== Image gallery ==
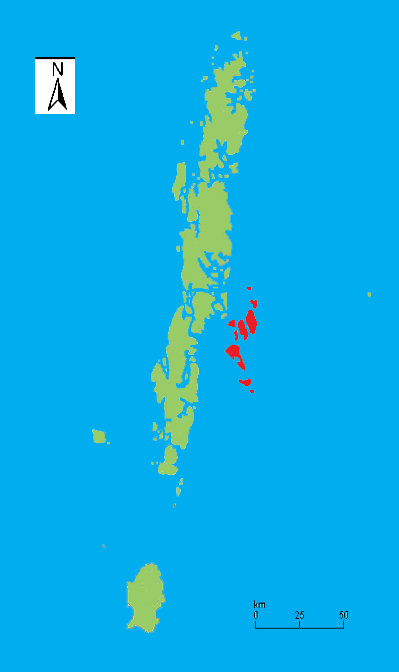
Outline map of the Andaman Islands, with Ritchie's Archipelago highlighted (in red).

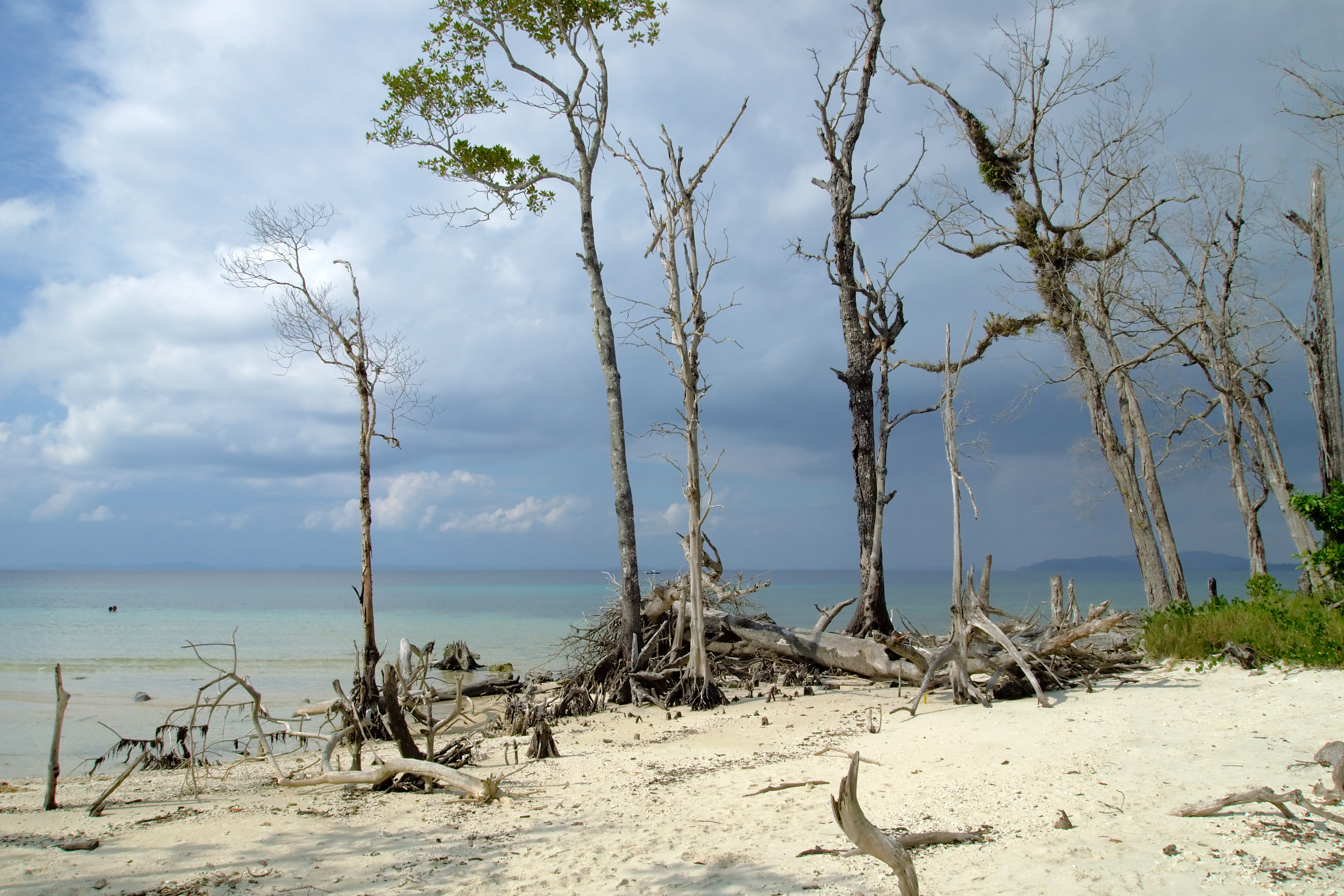
Beach view on Havelock Island

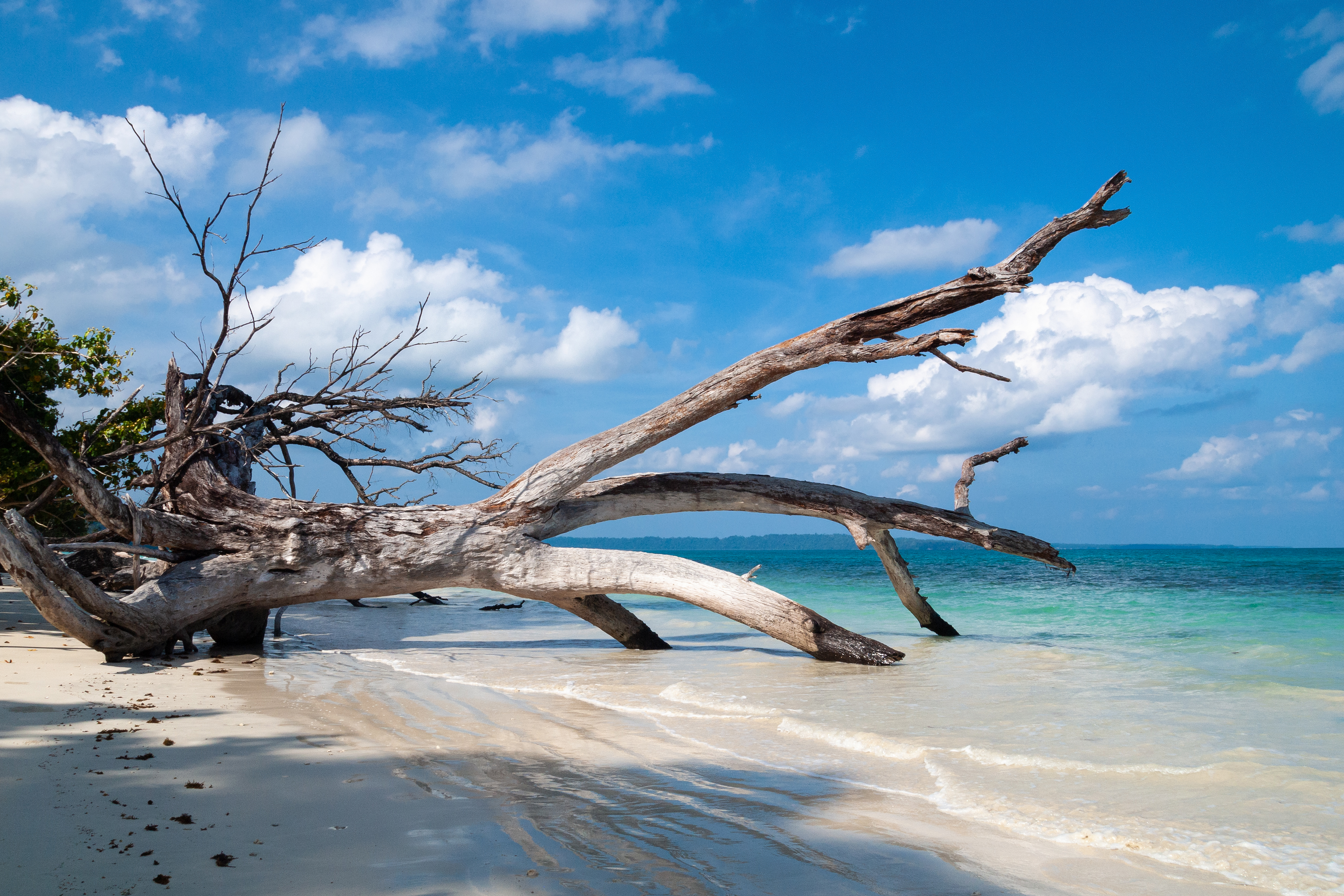
Lagoon, Havelock Island

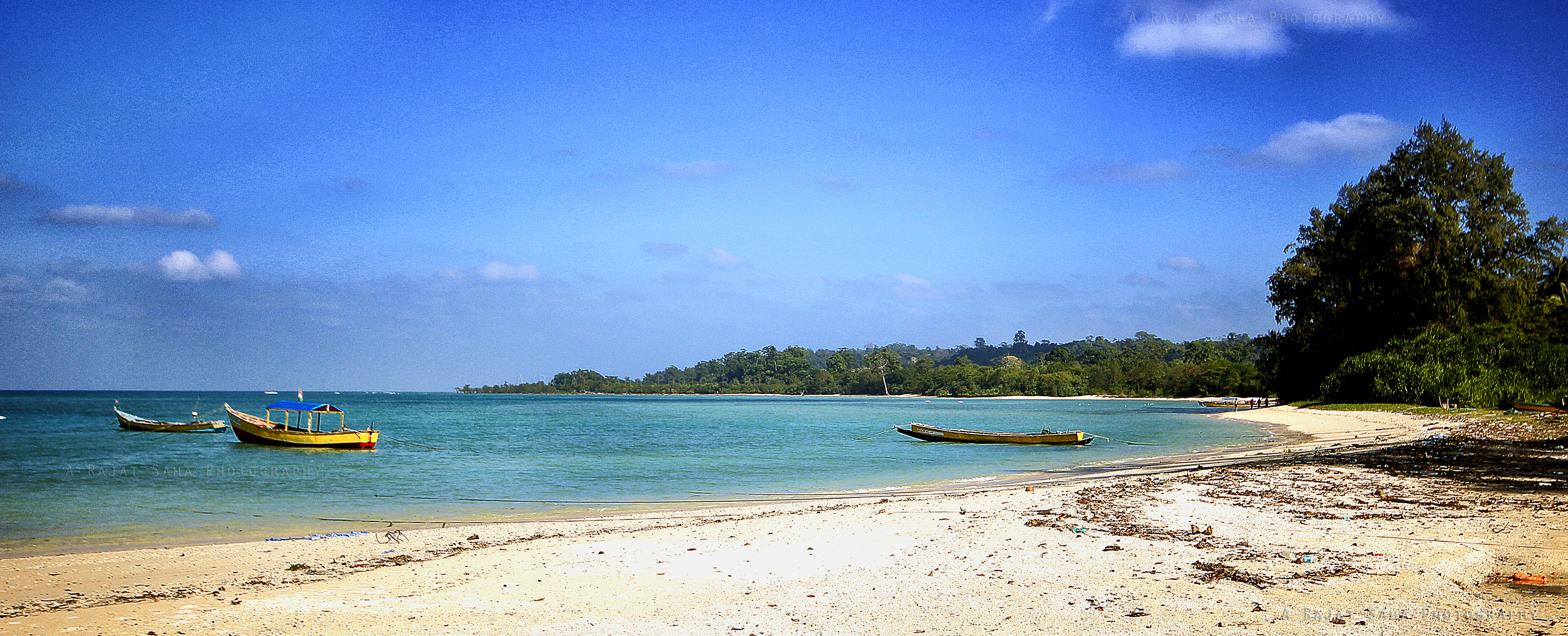
A beach on Neill Island

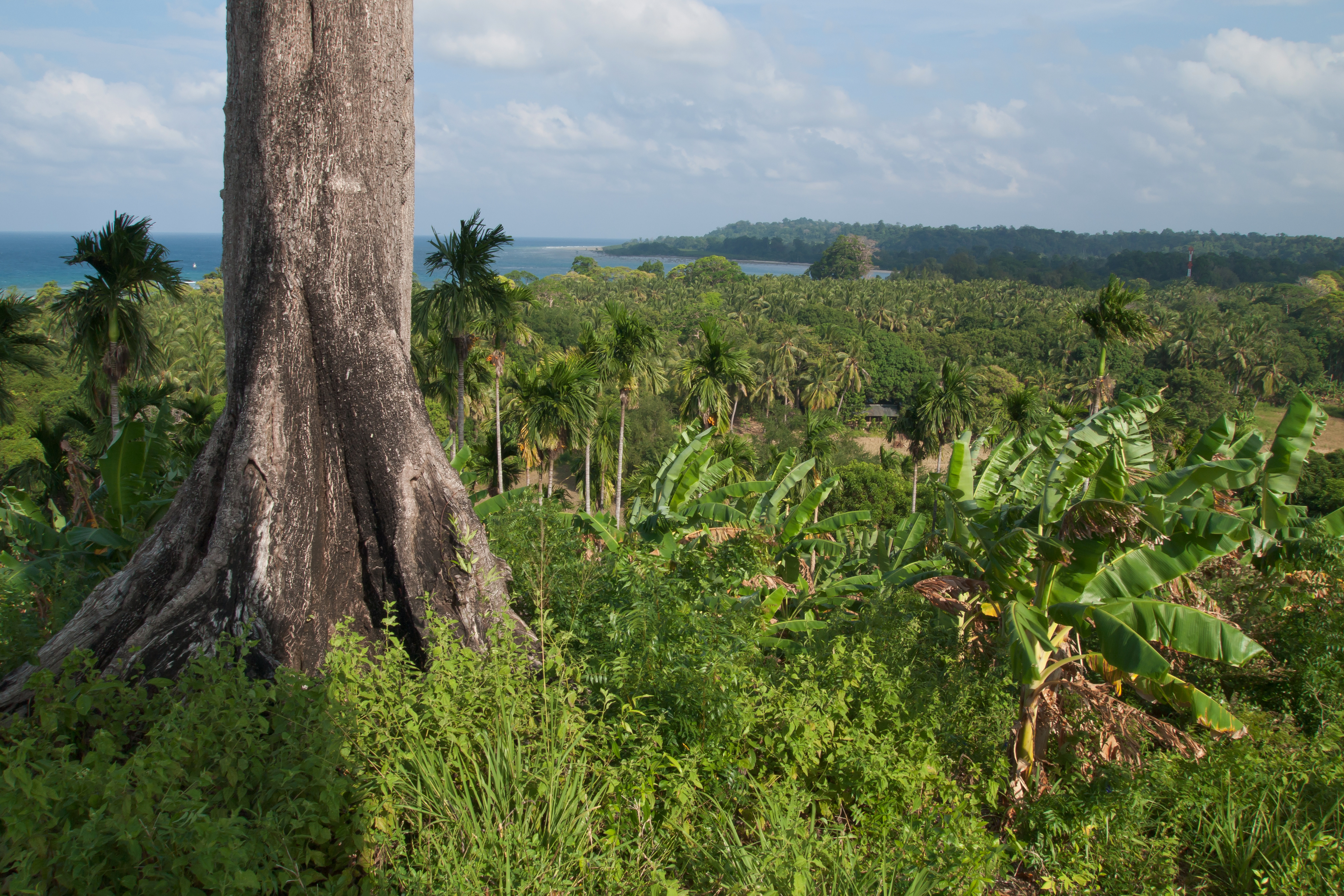
Forest cover, Shaheed Island
