= Sir Hugh Rose Island =

Island in India

Nickname: Rose Island
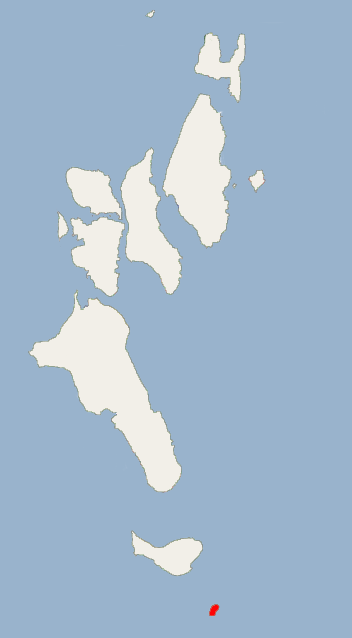
- Location within Ritchie's Archipelago

- Location map of Sir Hugh Rose Island Sir Hugh Rose Island (India)
- Interactive map of Sir Hugh Rose Island

Geography
- Location: Bay of Bengal
- Coordinates: 11°47′04″N 93°04′55″E
- Archipelago: Andaman Islands
- Adjacent to: Indian Ocean
- Area: 0.69 km^{2} (0.27 sq mi)
- Length: 1.2 km (0.75 mi)
- Width: 0.8 km (0.5 mi)
- Coastline: 3.5 km (2.17 mi)
- Highest elevation: 73 m (240 ft)

Administration
- India
- District: South Andaman
- Island group: Andaman Islands
- Island sub-group: Ritchie's Archipelago
- Tehsil: Port Blair Tehsil

Demographics
- Population: 0 (2011)

Additional information
- Time zone: IST (UTC+5:30)
- PIN: 744104
- Telephone code: 031927
- ISO code: IN-AN-00
- Official website: www.and.nic.in

Sir Hugh Rose Island, or Rose Island, sometimes called Little Neill Island, is an uninhabited island of the Andaman Islands. It belongs to the South Andaman administrative district, part of the Indian union territory of Andaman and Nicobar Islands. The island lies 40 km (25 mi) northeast of Port Blair.

== Etymology ==
Rose is named after Field marshal Hugh Rose.

== History ==
The lighthouse is situated on a hillock. There are 70 masonry steps to reach the tower. The Lighthouse is an unattended station. A rainwater tank and a restroom have been provided for the maintenance staff. A third order revolving optic, on a mercury trough with DA (dissolved acetylene) gas burner and gas motor to revolve the optic, all supplied by M/s BBT, Paris were installed inside the lantern house over the CI tower . The light was commissioned on 14 April 1969. Due to frequent failures of the rotation system, the revolving optic assembly was removed and a 500-millimetre (20-inch) cut-and-polished drum optic was placed in position in 1978. The DA gas burner was replaced by a DA gas flasher with a sun valve. This reduced the consumption of DA gas but the intensity of the light went down.

With the shortage in the supply of DA gas, it became essential to change over to solar energy. Accordingly, the light source was replaced by 12V 100W Halogen lamp inside the same optic and on the same pedestal. The system became operational on 18 October 1993.

== Geography ==
The island belongs to the Ritchie's Archipelago and is located 4 km (2 mi) south of Neill Island. It is locally known as 'Chhota' Neil (‘Little’ Neil).

== Administration ==
Politically, Rose Island is part of Port Blair Taluk.

== Demographics ==
The island is uninhabited.

== Image gallery ==
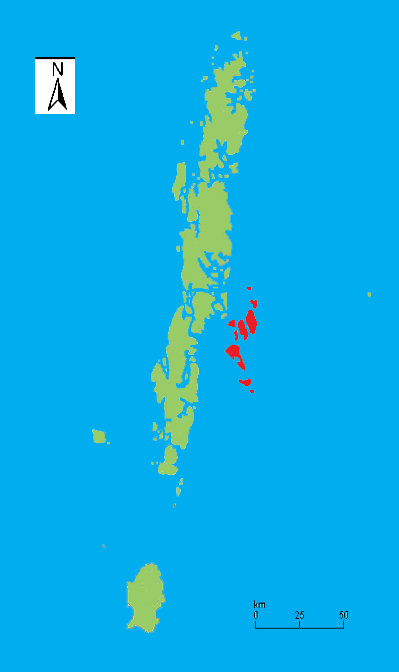
Outline map of the Andaman Islands, with Ritchie's Archipelago highlighted (in red).
