= Inglis Island (Ritchie's Archipelago) =

Native name: East Island Nickname: Sir John Inglis Island
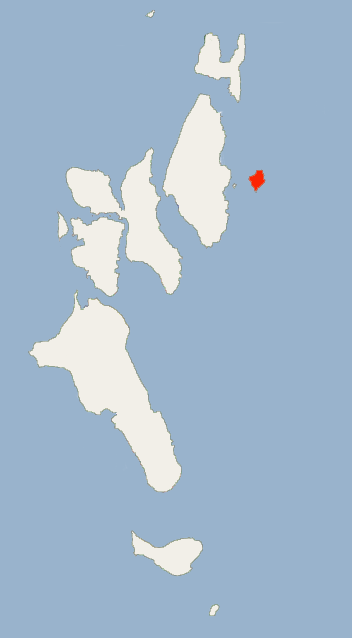
- Location of Inglis Island in Ritchie's Archipelago

- Location of Inglis Island in Andaman and Nicobar Islands

Geography
- Location: Bay of Bengal
- Coordinates: 12.140°N 93.115°E
- Archipelago: Andaman Islands
- Adjacent to: Indian Ocean
- Area: 1.66 km^{2} (0.64 sq mi)
- Length: 2 km (1.2 mi)
- Width: 1.6 km (0.99 mi)
- Coastline: 6 km (3.7 mi)
- Highest elevation: 2 m (7 ft)

Administration
- India
- District: South Andaman
- Island group: Andaman Islands
- Island sub-group: Ritchie's Archipelago
- Tehsil: Port Blair Tehsil
- Largest settlement: Chain Nalah point

Demographics
- Population: 0 (2011)

Additional information
- Time zone: IST (UTC+5:30)
- PIN: 744202
- Telephone code: 031927
- ISO code: IN-AN-00
- Official website: www.and.nic.in

Inglis Island is an island of the Andaman Islands. It belongs to the South Andaman administrative district, part of the Indian union territory of Andaman and Nicobar Islands. The island is located 67 km (42 mi) northeast from Port Blair.

== Etymology ==
Inglis island is named after Major-general Sir John Eardley Wilmot Inglis.

== Geography ==
The island belongs to the Ritchie's Archipelago and is located east of Henry Lawrence Island. Chain Nalah point is a popular tourist beach located on the island's west coast. it has some picnic tables on it.

== Administration ==
Politically, Inglis Island is part of Port Blair Taluk.

== Demographics ==
The island is uninhabited.

== Image gallery ==
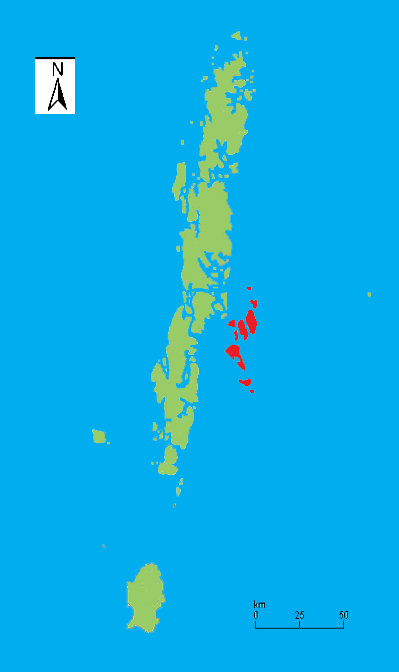
Outline map of the Andaman Islands, with Ritchie's Archipelago highlighted (in red).
