= Henry Lawrence Island =

Island of the Andaman Islands

Nickname: Sir Henry Lawrence Island
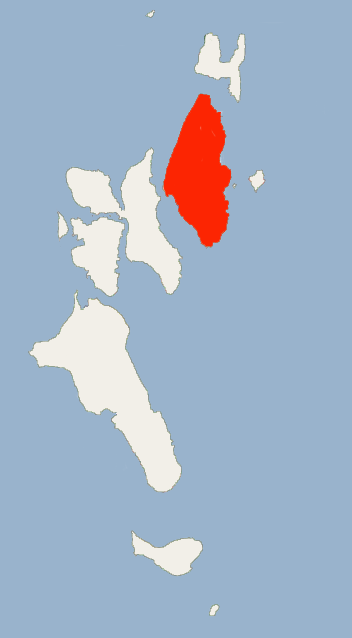
- Location of Henry Lawrence Island in Ritchie's Archipelago

- Location of Henry Lawrence Island in Andaman and Nicobar Islands

Geography
- Location: Bay of Bengal
- Coordinates: 12.15°N 93.06°E
- Archipelago: Andaman Islands
- Adjacent to: Indian Ocean
- Total islands: 1
- Major islands: Henry Lawrence
- Area: 54.7 km^{2} (21.1 sq mi)
- Length: 6 km (3.7 mi)
- Width: 14 km (8.7 mi)
- Coastline: 36.5 km (22.68 mi)
- Highest elevation: 137 m (449 ft)

Administration
- India
- District: South Andaman
- Island group: Andaman Islands
- Island sub-group: Ritchie's Archipelago
- Tehsil: Port Blair Tehsil

Demographics
- Population: 0 (2011)

Additional information
- Time zone: IST (UTC+5:30)
- PIN: 744202
- Telephone code: 031927
- ISO code: IN-AN-00
- Official website: www.and.nic.in

Henry Lawrence Island is an island of the Andaman Islands. It belongs to the South Andaman administrative district, part of the Indian union territory of Andaman and Nicobar Islands. The island is located 60 km (37 mi) northeast of Port Blair.

== Etymology ==
Henry Lawrence island is named after Brigadier-general Sir Henry Montgomery Lawrence.

== Geography ==
The island belongs to the Ritchie's Archipelago and is located between John Lawrence Island and Inglis Island. it is the second largest Island of the Ritchie's Archipelago, it has an area of 54.7 square kilometres (21.1 sq mi).

== Administration ==
Politically, Henry Lawrence Island is part of Port Blair Taluk.

== Demographics ==
The island is uninhabited.

== Image gallery ==
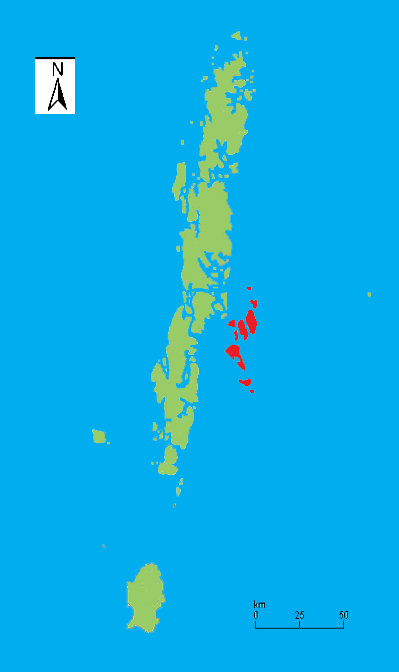
Outline map of the Andaman Islands, with Ritchie's Archipelago highlighted (in red).
