= John Lawrence Island =

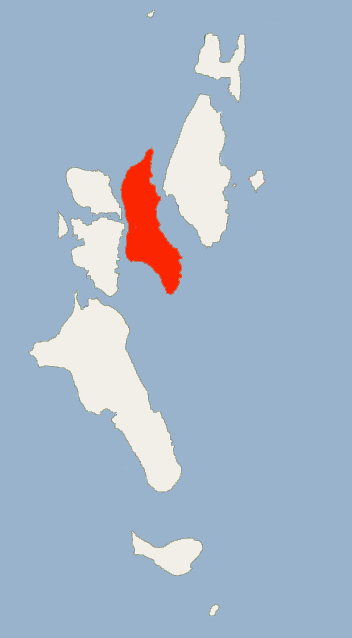
- Location of John Lawrence Island in Ritchie's Archipelago

- Location within Andaman and Nicobar Islands Location within India

Geography
- Location: Bay of Bengal
- Coordinates: 12.10°N 93.02°E
- Archipelago: Andaman Islands
- Adjacent to: Indian Ocean
- Total islands: 1
- Major islands: John Lawrence
- Area: 34.8 km^{2} (13.4 sq mi)
- Length: 13.3 km (8.26 mi)
- Width: 4.3 km (2.67 mi)
- Coastline: 34.3 km (21.31 mi)

Administration
- India
- District: South Andaman
- Island group: Andaman Islands
- Island sub-group: Ritchie's Archipelago
- Tehsil: Port Blair Tehsil

Demographics
- Population: 0 (2011)

Additional information
- Time zone: IST (UTC+5:30)
- PIN: 744202
- Telephone code: 031927
- ISO code: IN-AN-00
- Official website: www.and.nic.in

John Lawrence Island is an island of the Andaman Islands and belongs to the South Andaman administrative district, part of the Indian union territory of Andaman and Nicobar Islands. The island is 54 km (34 mi) northeast from Port Blair.

== Etymology ==
The island is named after Sir John Lawrence who served as Viceroy of India from 1864 to 1869.

== Geography ==
The island belongs to the Ritchie's Archipelago and is located between Peel Island, Wilson Island and Henry Lawrence Island, named for Sir John Lawrence's brother. John Lawrence Island is long in shape. It is surrounded by beaches on three sides. Since the island is quite long in shape, the beach stretches to a long distance.

== Administration ==
Politically, John Lawrence Island is part of Port Blair Taluk.

== Demographics ==
The island is uninhabited.

== Transportation ==
The only way to reach John Lawrence Island is by local boat services. There is boat service from Port Blair and Havelock Island through which you can reach this island. However, boat rides are subject to weather and condition of the sea. There is a small channel between John Lawrence Island and Henry Lawrence Island that is lined with thick mangrove forests. Terrestrial moist forests and mangroves form the main vegetation of John Lawrence Island.

== Shipwrecks ==
On 12 November 1844, a cyclone deposited two British vessels, sailing separately, about a quarter of a mile apart on the shore of the island. Of the approximately 630 people on Briton and Runnymede, most of them soldiers and their dependents going to Calcutta, only one died in the wrecking, though some died later. The survivors were all rescued by 5 January 1845.
