= Neil Island =

Island in the Andaman Islands of India

Shaheed Dweep
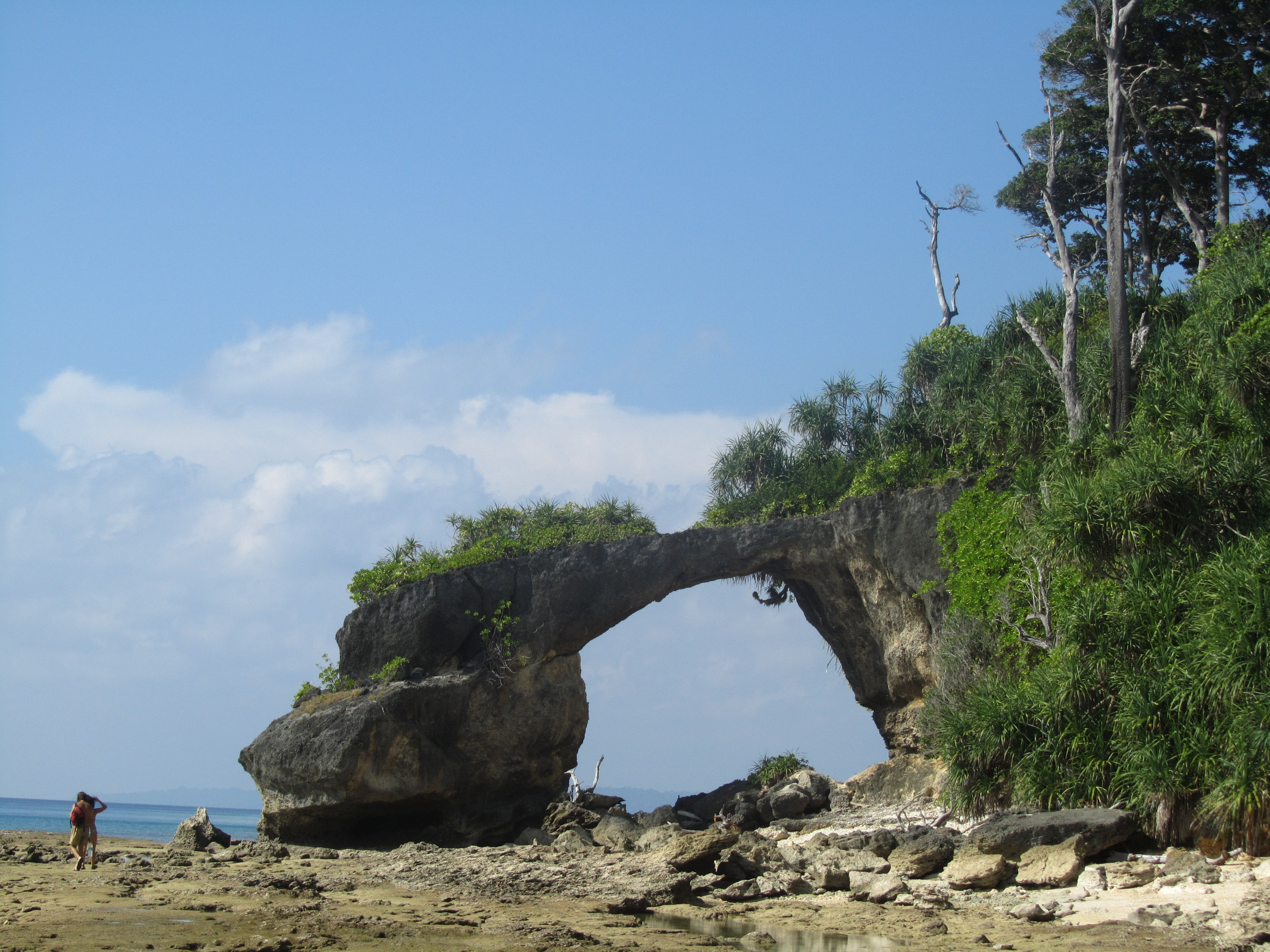

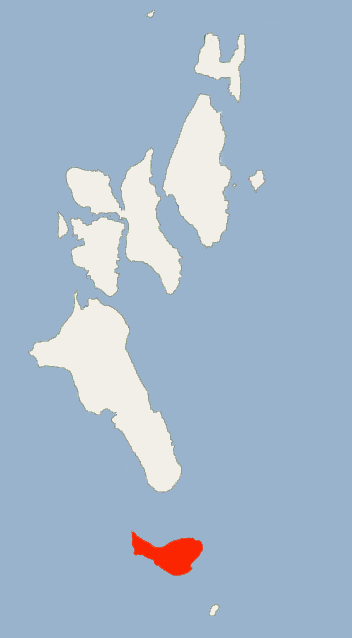
- Shaheed Dweep within Ritchie's Archipelago

- Location within Andaman and Nicobar Islands Location within India

Geography
- Location: Bay of Bengal
- Coordinates: 11.83°N 93.04°E
- Archipelago: Andaman Islands
- Adjacent to: Indian Ocean
- Area: 13.7 km^{2} (5.3 sq mi)
- Length: 3.7 km (2.3 mi)
- Width: 6.3 km (3.91 mi)
- Coastline: 19.4 km (12.05 mi)
- Highest elevation: 101 m (331 ft)
- Highest point: Nipple Hill

Administration
- India
- District: South Andaman
- Island group: Andaman Islands
- Island sub-group: Ritchie's Archipelago
- Tehsil: Port Blair Tehsil
- Largest settlement: Neil Kendra (pop. 1000)

Demographics
- Population: 3040 (in 2011)
- Pop. density: 222.00/km^{2} (574.98/sq mi)
- Ethnic groups: Tamil, Andamanese

Additional information
- Time zone: IST (UTC+5:30)
- PIN: 744104
- Telephone code: 031927
- ISO code: IN-AN-00
- Official website: www.and.nic.in
- Literacy: 84.4%
- Avg. summer temperature: 30.2 °C (86.4 °F)
- Avg. winter temperature: 23.0 °C (73.4 °F)
- Sex ratio: 1.2♂/♀
- Census code: 35.639.0004
- Official languages: Hindi, English

Neil Island, officially known as Shaheed Dweep (transl. Martyr's Island), is an island of the Andaman Islands, located in Ritchie's Archipelago. It belongs to the South Andaman administrative district, part of the Indian union territory of Andaman and Nicobar Islands. The island is located 36 km (22 mi) northeast from Port Blair.

== Etymology ==
Neil Island was named after British Brigadier general James Neill, who had fought on the side of the British East Indian company in the Sepoy Mutiny of 1857.

In December 2018, it was renamed as Shaheed Dweep as a tribute to Netaji Subhas Chandra Bose. Bose had hoisted the Indian flag at Port Blair on 30 December 1943 and proclaimed the Andaman and Nicobar Islands as territories liberated from British rule. He had subsequently named Andaman Island as Shaheed and Nicobar Island as Swaraj.

== History ==
Shaheed Dweep, then Neil Island, was uninhabited until the arrival of settlers in the late 1960s. Like Swaraj Dweep, then Havelock, the vast majority of settlers at Shaheed Dweep were refugees from erstwhile East Pakistan, following the genocide and exodus of Hindu Bangladeshis prior to that country's war of independence in 1971.

== Geography ==
The island belongs to the Ritchie's Archipelago and is located between Swaraj Dweep and Rose Island. It is a comparatively flat island, and much of the landmass was deemed suitable for paddy cultivation. Unfortunately, as a result of this, very little forest cover remains at Shaheed, and almost all of it is concentrated in the reserve forest on Shaheed's north-western side. Shaheed Dweep tends to remain a degree or two warmer than Havelock as a result of the lack of forest cover.

== Administration ==
Politically, Shaheed Dweep is part of Neil Kendra panchayat, of Port Blair Taluk.

== Demographics ==
The population of 3040 lives in five villages, listed below, with population at 2011 census in parentheses:

- Sitapur (274)
- Bharatpur (629)
- Neil Kendra (1000)
- Lakshmanpur (382)
- Ram Nagar (755)

== Economy ==
Agriculture is the primary occupation of the villagers, and the island supplies vegetables to the rest of Andaman. Neil Island is known for its organic cultivation and provides much of the organic produce to remaining part of the islands.

== Tourism ==
Tourism on Shaheed Dweep is characterized by a relaxed, slower-paced eco-centric atmosphere that contrasts sharply with the bustling commercial crowds of neighboring Swaraj Dweep. Its primary natural attractions include the serene, sunset-facing Laxmanpur Beach, the shallow, swimming-friendly waters of Bharatpur Beach, and a unique, naturally formed limestone rock archway commonly referred to as the Natural Bridge. The island is highly popular for low-tide reef walking, where tourists can observe live coral ecosystems, sea cucumbers, and vibrant marine biodiversity without deep-sea diving.

== Transport ==
- Air - Pawan Hans helicopter service: Port Blair to Shaheed Dweep (Neil Island): Flight duration is about 15–20 minutes, with a subsidized tourist fare of approximately ₹3,500 one-way.Port Blair to Long Island: Flight duration is roughly 30 minutes, with a tourist fare of approximately ₹2,850 one-way
- Seaport: There is a jetty at Neil Kendra, which serves as the only access point of the island. There are regular Government ferry from Port Blair to Shaheed Dweep. Maritime transport to the island is serviced via daily passenger ferries from Sri Vijaya Puram and Swaraj Dweep, with all arrivals and cargo logistics handled exclusively at the centrally located Neil Island Jetty. There are private cruise ships such as Makruzz, Green Ocean, Nautika and ITT Majestic.
- Water aerodrome terminal: India has 4 water aerodrome terminals in the Andaman and Nicobar Islands for the civilian seaplane services under the government’s regional connectivity scheme (UDAN), at (listed north to south) Long Island, Swaraj Dweep (formerly Havelock Island), Shaheed Dweep (formerly Neil Island), and Hutbay (Little Andaman).
- Local transport: Due to its exceptionally flat terrain and compact geographic footprint, local commuting is highly conducive to sustainable transit, relying heavily on rented mopeds, bicycles, and hired auto-rickshaws navigating the island's narrow, interconnected village roads.

== Image gallery ==
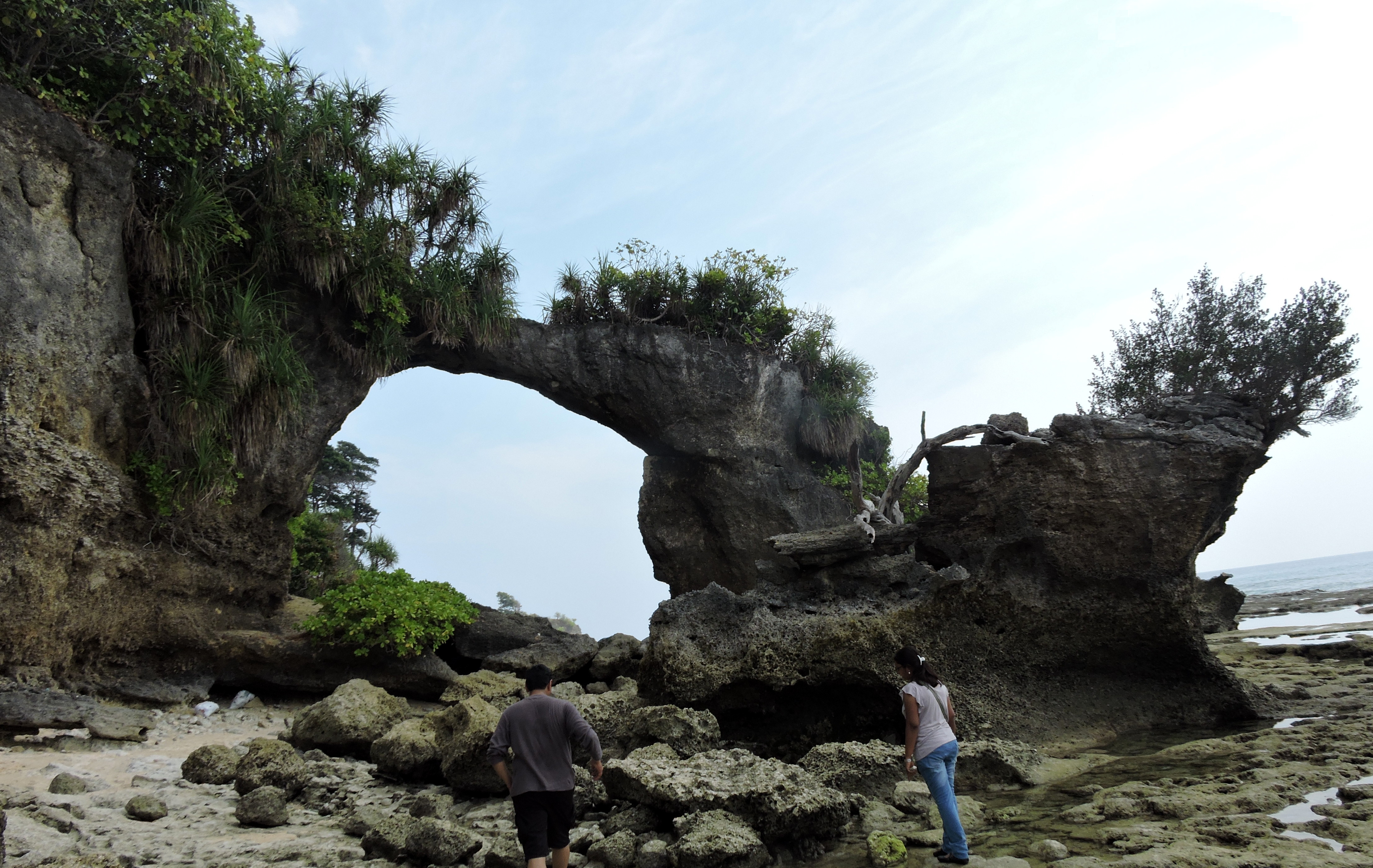
Natural Bridge, Neil Island.

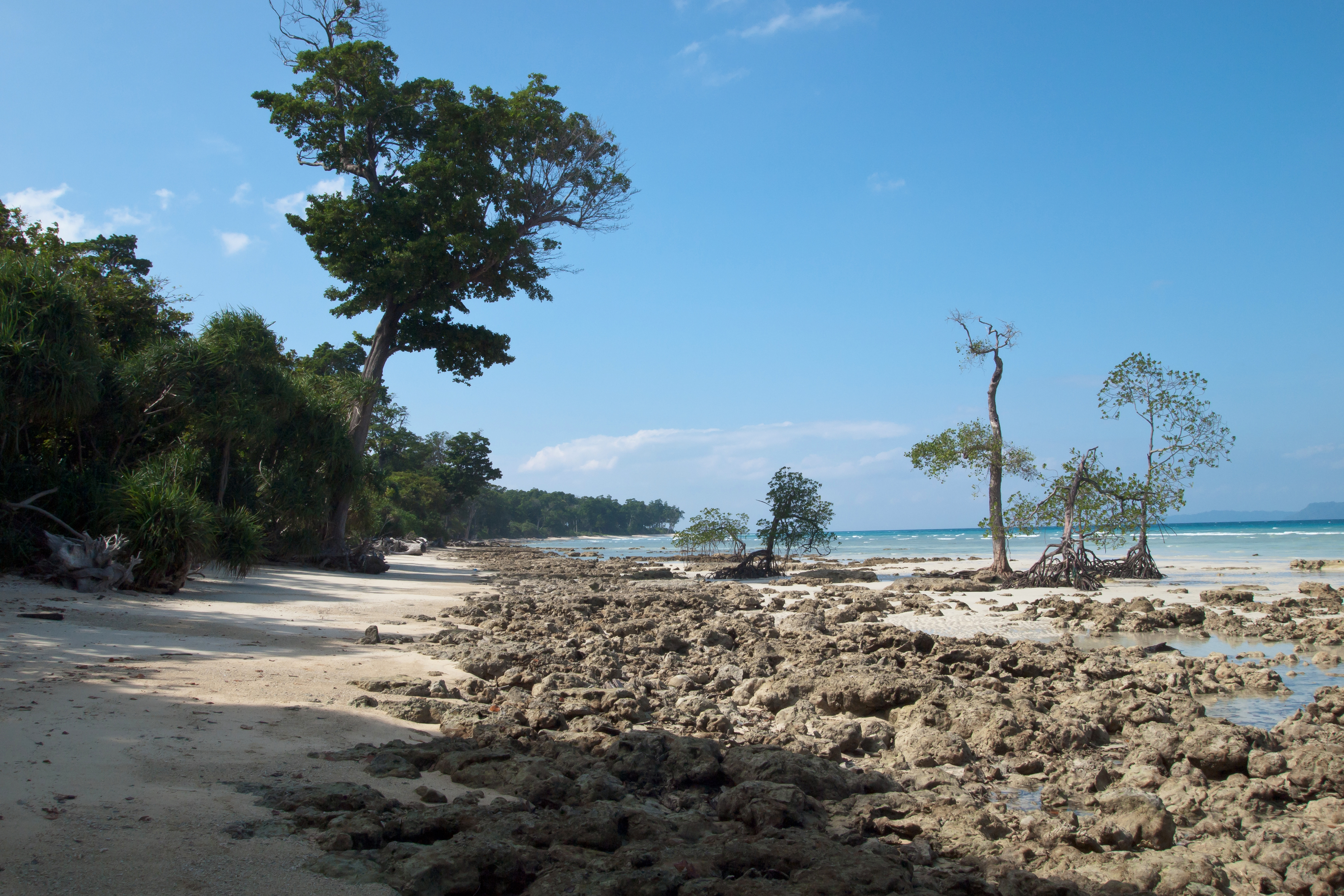
Mangrove trees

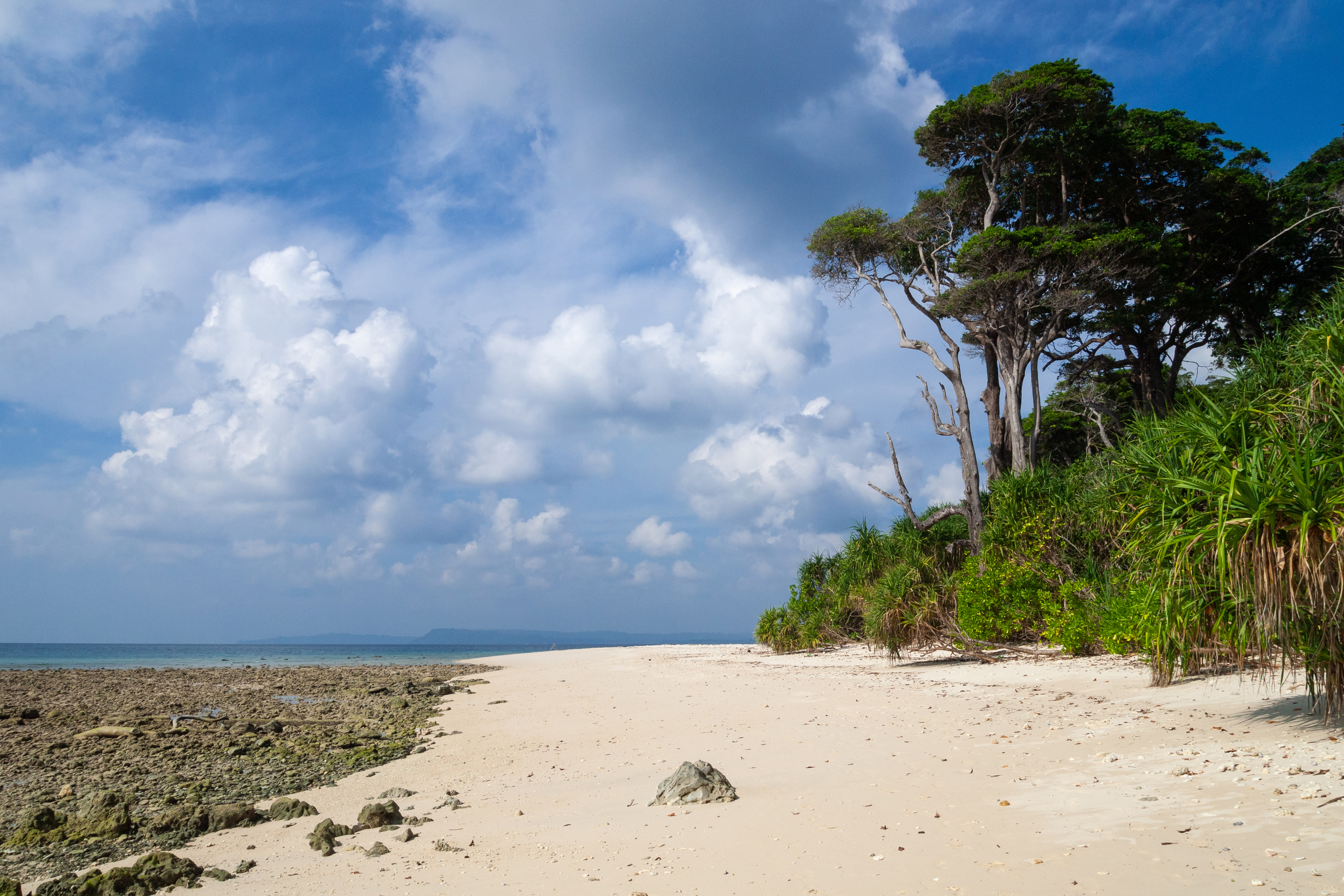
Tropical beach

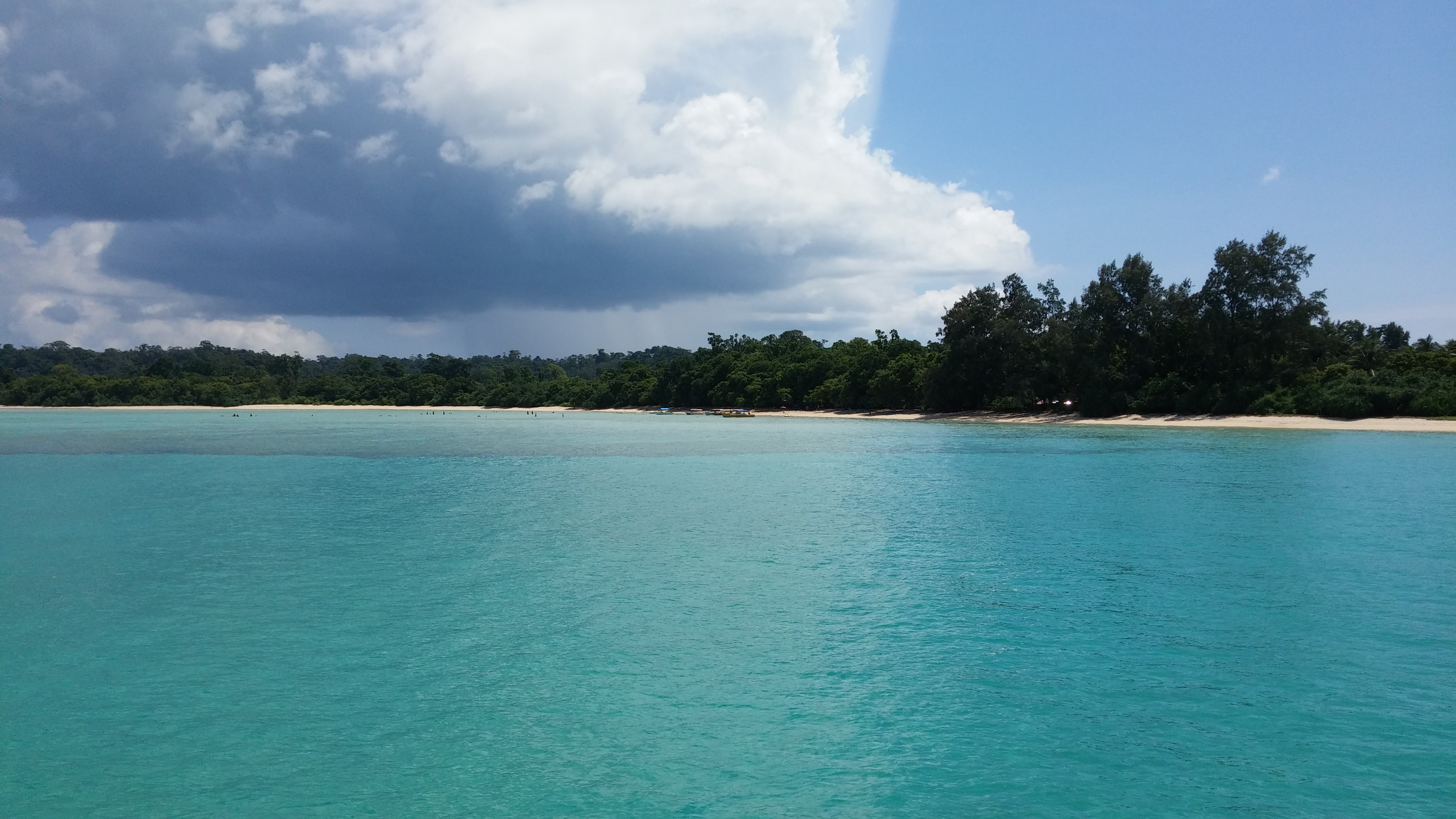
Bharatpur beach as seen from jetty

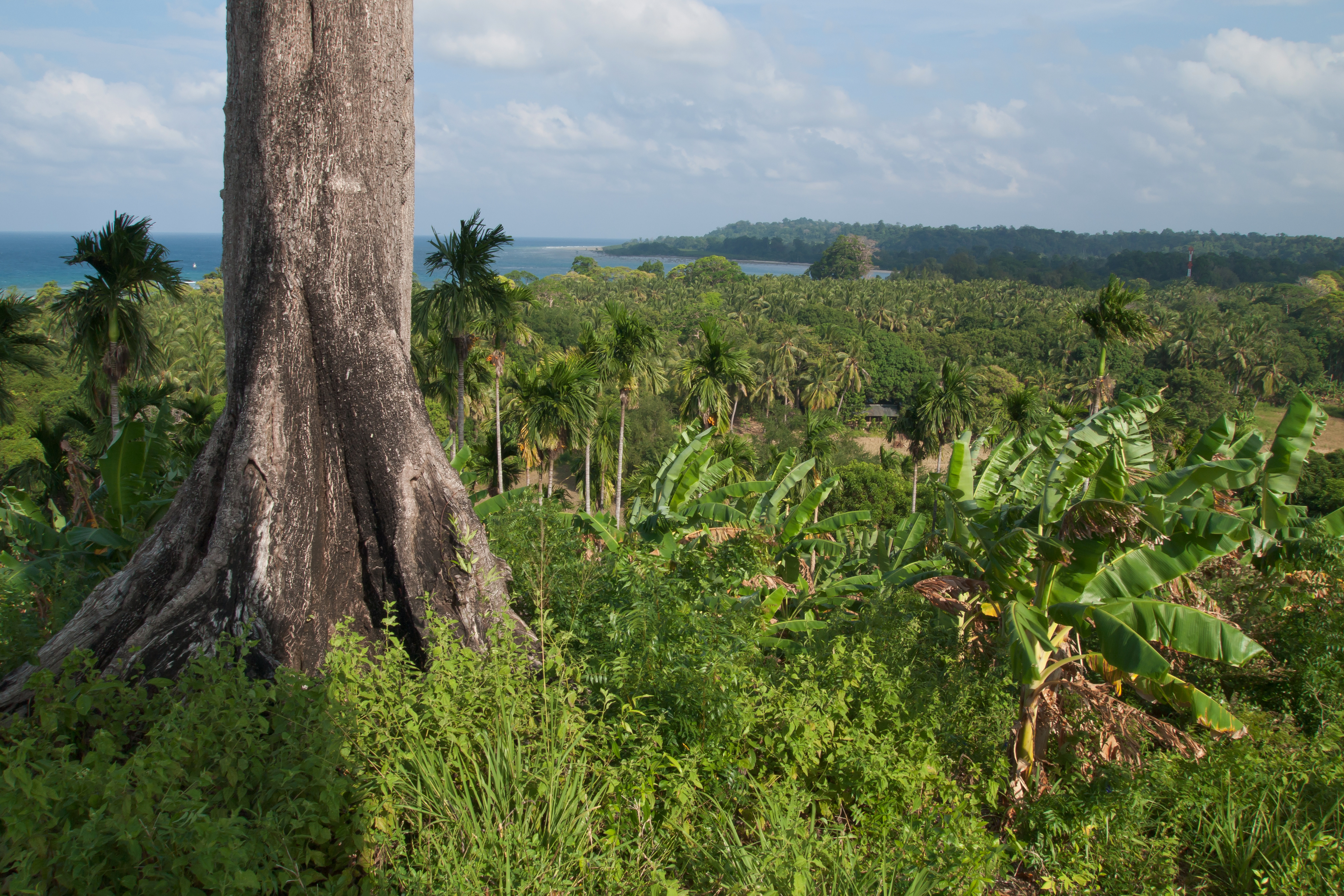
Interior forest

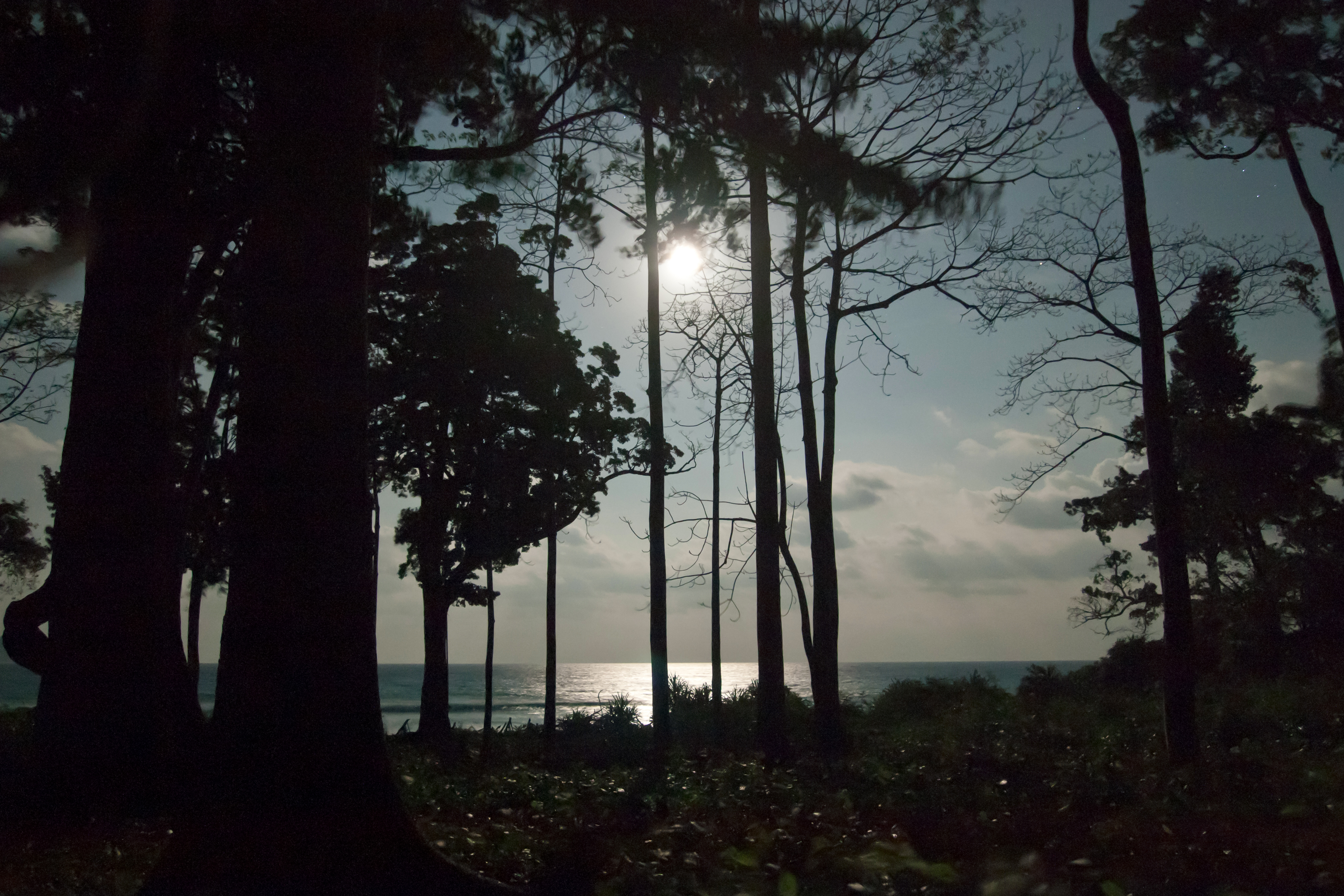
Forest by the sea at night

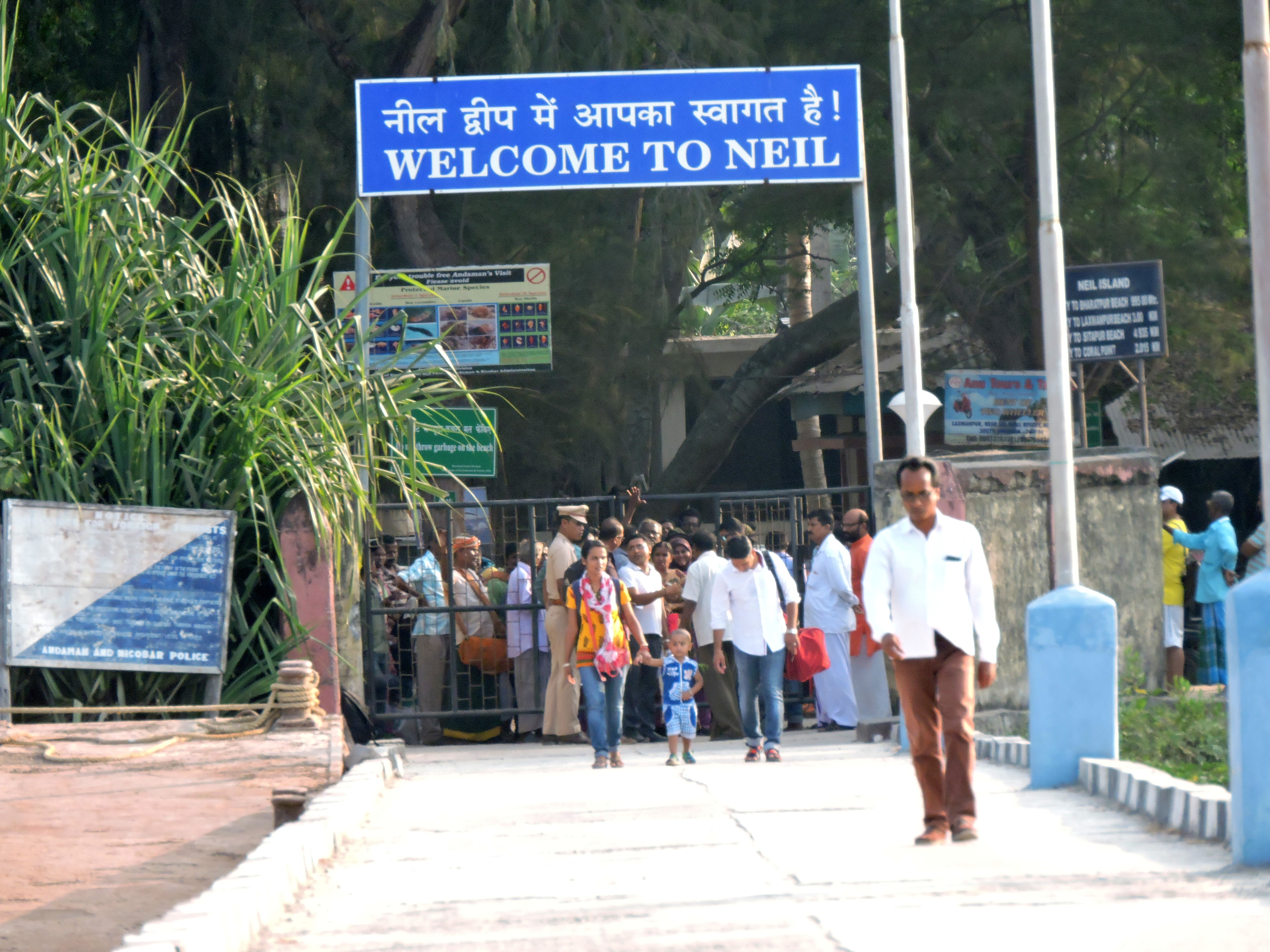
Entry to Neil Island from Bharatpur Jetty.

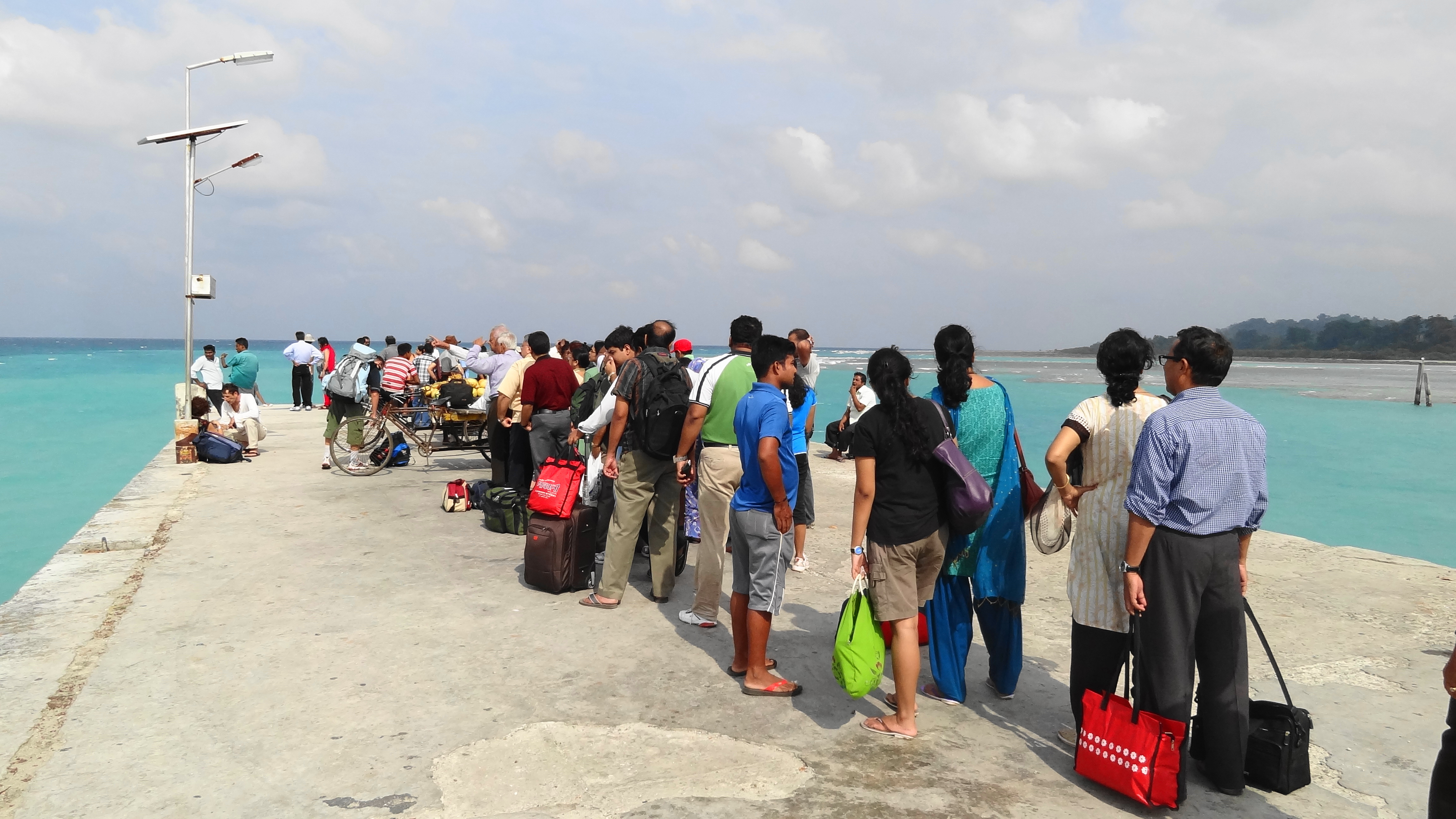
Bharathpur Jetty

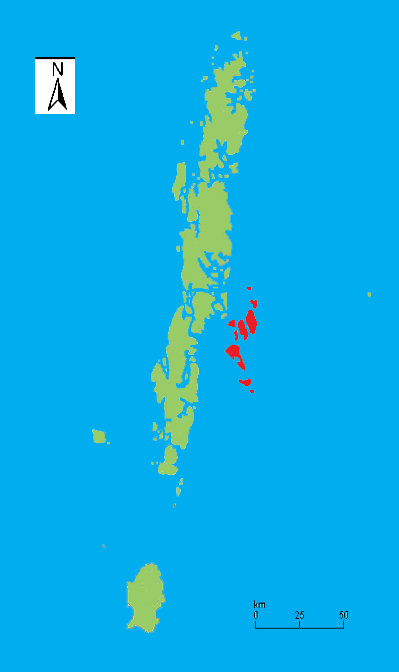
Ritchie's Archipelago within the Andaman Islands

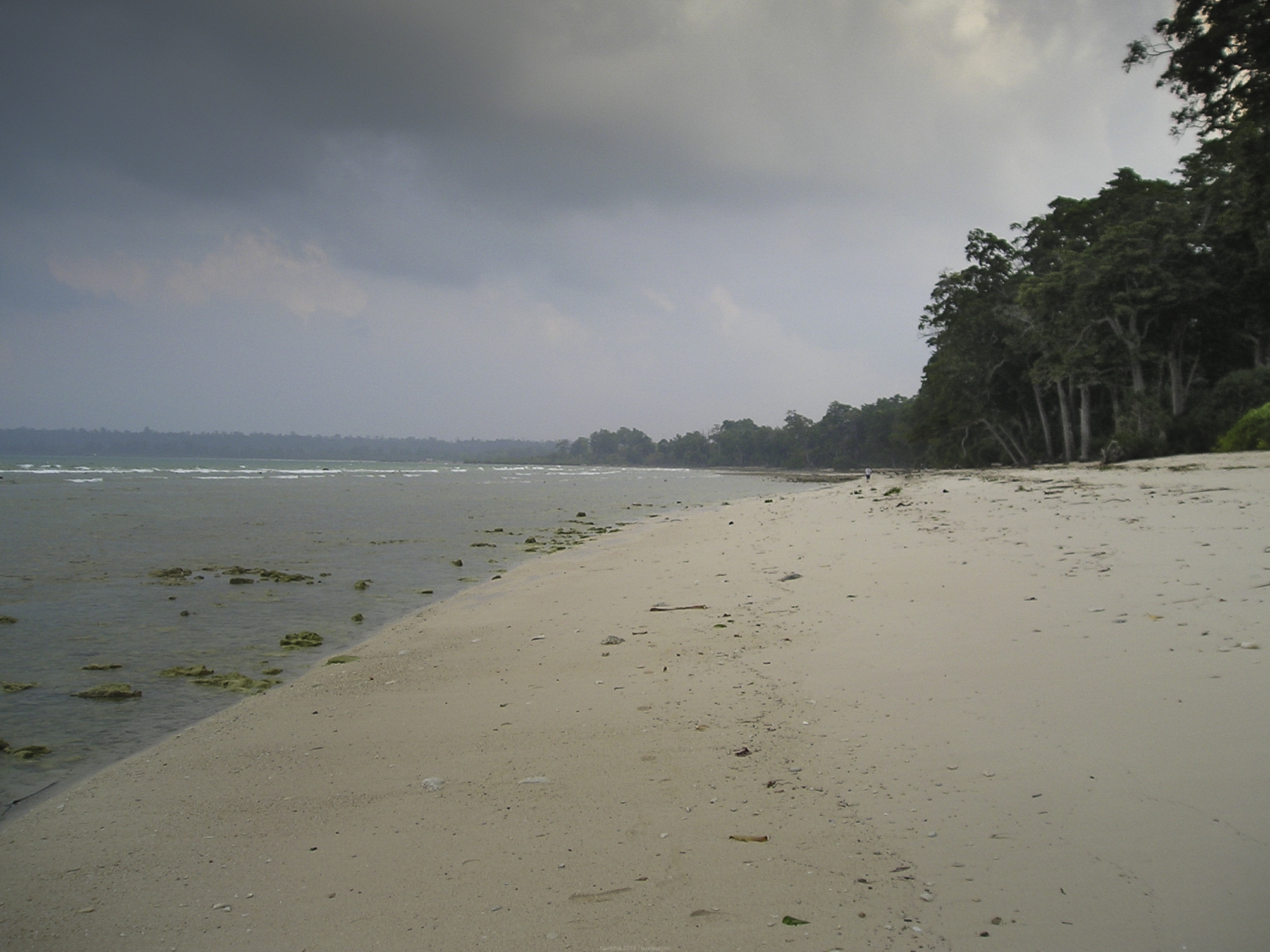
Neil Island on 26 December 2004, after earthquake and tsunami

== See also ==
- Tourism in the Andaman and Nicobar Islands
- Tourism in India
