= Outram Island =

Indian island

Nickname: Sir James Outram Island
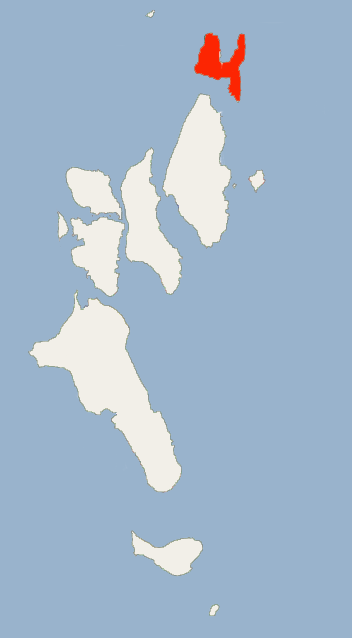
- Location of Outram Island in Ritchie's Archipelago

- Location of Outram Island in Andaman and Nicobar Islands

Geography
- Location: Bay of Bengal
- Coordinates: 12.23°N 93.08°E
- Archipelago: Andaman Islands
- Adjacent to: Indian Ocean
- Area: 13.9 km^{2} (5.4 sq mi)
- Length: 6 km (3.7 mi)
- Width: 4.3 km (2.67 mi)
- Coastline: 25.9 km (16.09 mi)
- Highest elevation: 0 m (0 ft)

Administration
- India
- District: South Andaman
- Island group: Andaman Islands
- Island sub-group: Ritchie's Archipelago
- Tehsil: Port Blair Tehsil

Demographics
- Population: 0 (2011)

Additional information
- Time zone: IST (UTC+5:30)
- PIN: 744202
- Telephone code: 031927
- ISO code: IN-AN-00
- Official website: www.and.nic.in

Outram Island is an island of the Andaman Islands. It belongs to the South Andaman administrative district, part of the Indian union territory of Andaman and Nicobar Islands. It is 72 km (45 mi) northeast from Port Blair.

== Etymology ==
Outram is named after Lieutenant-general James Outram.

== Geography ==
The island belongs to the Ritchie's Archipelago and is located west of North Passage Island.

== Administration ==
Politically, Outram Island is part of Port Blair Taluk.

== Demographics ==
The island is uninhabited.
