= Port Blair tehsil =

Region of India

Coordinates: 11.623°N 92.728°E

Port Blair tehsil, officially Sri Vijaya Puram tehsil, is one of 5 local administrative divisions of the Indian district of South Andaman, part of the Indian union territory of Andaman and Nicobar Islands.

It is a division known locally as a tehsil, roughly equivalent to a county in its range of administrative powers. Located in the Indian Ocean Andaman Islands, it is the largest tehsil in terms of both area and number of inhabitants, accounting for half of the district's overall population. Its headquarters is the township also called Port Blair, the district's major urban centre and capital of the Union Territory.

Port Blair tehsil's population according to 2011 Census of India figures was 165,754.
