= Sir William Peel Island =

Island of the Andaman and Nicobar Islands, India

Peel Island
Nickname: Sir William Peel Island
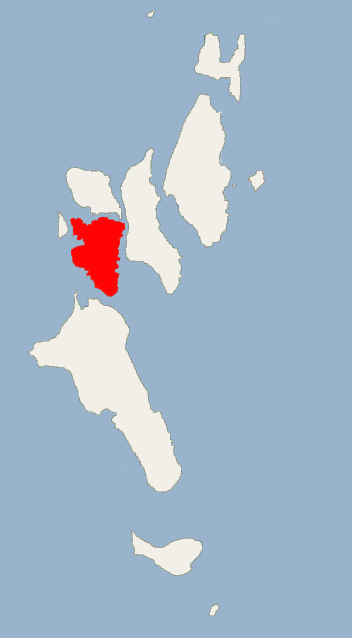
- Location of Peel Island in Ritchie's Archipelago

- Location of Peel Island in Andaman and Nicobar Islands Sir William Peel Island (India)

Geography
- Location: Bay of Bengal
- Coordinates: 12°05′N 92°59′E
- Archipelago: Andaman Islands
- Adjacent to: Indian Ocean
- Total islands: 1
- Major islands: Peel
- Area: 23.7 km^{2} (9.2 sq mi)
- Length: 7.3 km (4.54 mi)
- Width: 4.5 km (2.8 mi)
- Coastline: 28.9 km (17.96 mi)

Administration
- India
- District: South Andaman
- Island group: Andaman Islands
- Island sub-group: Ritchie's Archipelago
- Tehsil: Port Blair Tehsil

Demographics
- Population: 0 (2011)

Additional information
- Time zone: IST (UTC+5:30)
- PIN: 744211
- Telephone code: 031927
- ISO code: IN-AN-00
- Official website: www.and.nic.in

Peel Island is an island of the Andaman Islands. It belongs to the South Andaman administrative district, part of the Indian union territory of the Andaman and Nicobar Islands. The island lies 51 km (32 mi) to the North-East of Port Blair.

== Etymology ==
The island is named after Captain Sir William Peel of the Royal Navy, who died in the Indian Rebellion of 1857.

== Geography ==
The island is part of the Ritchie's Archipelago Group and is located between Nicholson Island and John Lawrence Island.

== Administration ==
Politically, Peel Island is part of Port Blair Taluk.

== Demographics ==
The island is uninhabited.

== Image gallery ==
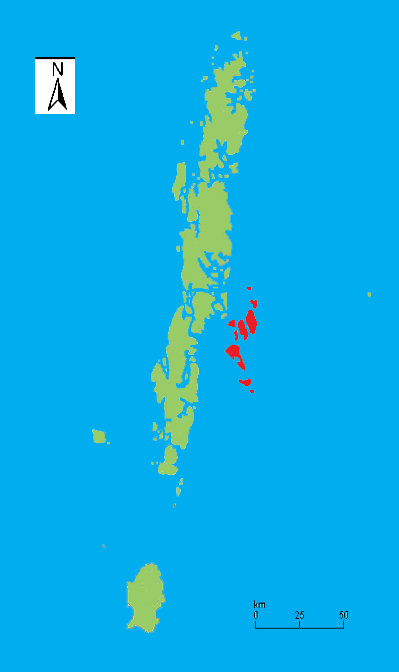
Outline map of the Andaman Islands, with Ritchie's Archipelago highlighted (in red).
