= South Andaman district =

- District of Andaman and Nicobar Islands
- Location within Andaman and Nicobar Islands Location within India
- Coordinates: 11°40′12″N 92°44′24″E
- Country: India
- Union territory: Andaman and Nicobar Islands
- Headquarter: Sri Vijaya Puram

Population (2011)
  - Total: 238,142
- Time zone: UTC+5:30 (IST)
- Website: southandaman.nic.in

South Andaman district is one of the three districts of the Indian Union Territory of Andaman and Nicobar Islands located in the Bay of Bengal. Sri Vijaya Puram, the capital of the Union Territory is the district headquarters. The area covered by this district is 2,640 km^{2}.

== History ==
This district was created on August 18, 2006, by bifurcating the erstwhile Andaman district.

== Geography ==
South Andaman district occupies an area of 3,181 square kilometres (1,228 sq mi), covering South Andaman Island, Rutland Island, Little Andaman Island, North Sentinel Island, South Sentinel Island and Ritchie's Archipelago.

== Demographics ==
According to the 2011 census South Andaman district has a population of 238,142, roughly equal to the nation of Vanuatu. This gives it a ranking of 584th in India (out of a total of 640). The district has a population density of 80 inhabitants per square kilometre (210/sq mi) . Its population growth rate over the decade 2001-2011 was 13.97%. South Andaman has a sex ratio of 874 females for every 1000 males, and a literacy rate of 88.49%.

Four of the indigenous Andamanese peoples, namely, Onges, Jarawas, Great Andamanese and Sentinelese live in this district.

=== Language ===
South Andaman district in 2011 census
1. Bengali (21.1%)
2. Tamil (20.7%)
3. Hindi (18.4%)
4. Telugu (17.7%)
5. Malayalam (9.85%)
6. Sadri (3.34%)
7. Kurukh (3.07%)
8. Nicobarese (1.67%)
9. Others (4.24%)

As of 2011 census, Bengali is spoken as the first language by 21.07 per cent of the district's population followed by Tamil (20.70%), Hindi (18.40%), Telugu (17.66%), Malayalam (9.85%), Sadri (3.34%), Kurukh (3.07%), Nicobarese (1.67%) and others.

=== Religion ===
Religion in North and Middle Andaman district (2011 census)
1. Hinduism (73.3%)
2. Christianity (13.9%)
3. Islam (12.1%)
4. Sikhism (0.36%)
5. Buddhism (0.06%)
6. Others (0.31%)

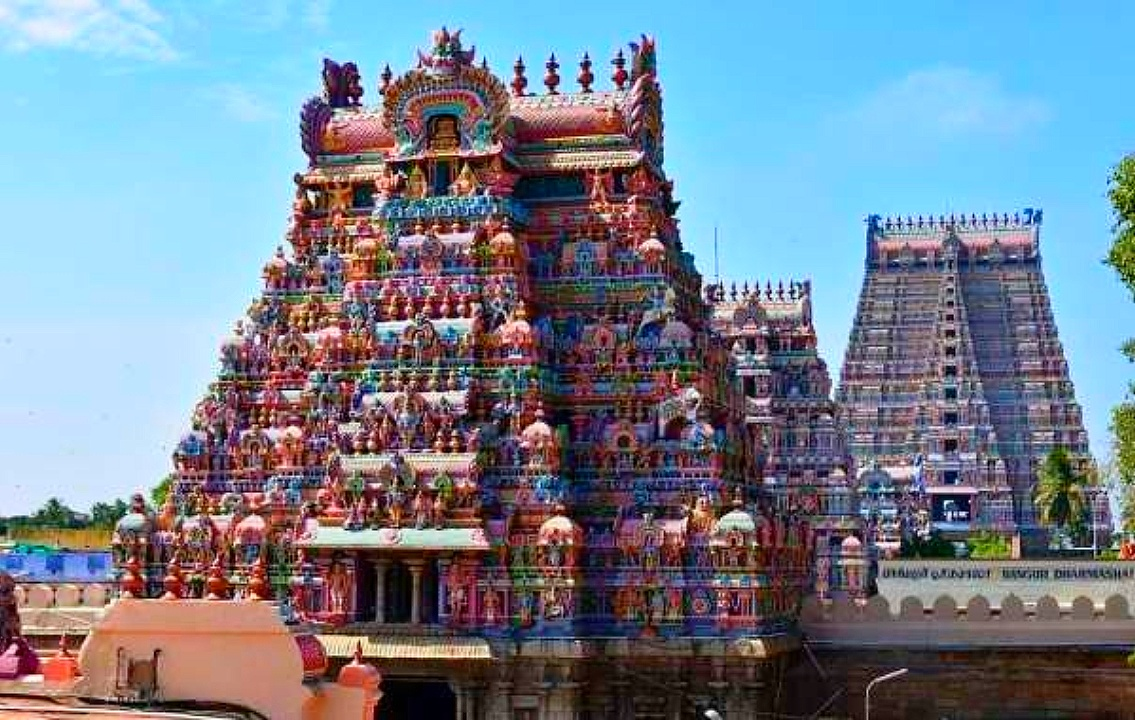
Sri Vettimalai Mutugan temple in Sri Vijaya Puram

Hinduism is followed by majority of the people in South Andaman district. Christianity and Islam are followed by a considerable population.

== Divisions ==
The district comprises three tehsils, Port Blair, Ferrargunj and Little Andaman.

== Climate ==
Climate data for Port Blair
Month	Jan	Feb	Mar	Apr	May	Jun	Jul	Aug	Sep	Oct	Nov	Dec	Year
Mean daily maximum °C (°F)	29.4 (84.9)	30.2 (86.4)	31.5 (88.7)	32.5 (90.5)	31.1 (88.0)	29.6 (85.3)	29.2 (84.6)	29.1 (84.4)	29.1 (84.4)	29.6 (85.3)	29.7 (85.5)	29.4 (84.9)	30.0 (86.1)
Mean daily minimum °C (°F)	23.1 (73.6)	22.5 (72.5)	23.2 (73.8)	24.7 (76.5)	24.7 (76.5)	24.4 (75.9)	24.3 (75.7)	24.2 (75.6)	23.7 (74.7)	23.7 (74.7)	23.9 (75.0)	23.6 (74.5)	23.8 (74.9)
Average precipitation mm (inches)	46.4 (1.83)	26.5 (1.04)	29.3 (1.15)	69.0 (2.72)	360.4 (14.19)	501.1 (19.73)	423.7 (16.68)	425.1 (16.74)	463.0 (18.23)	300.7 (11.84)	235.0 (9.25)	154.6 (6.09)	3,034.8 (119.49)

== See also ==
- Nicobar district
- North and Middle Andaman district
