= List of shipwrecks in November 1844 =

The list of shipwrecks in November 1844 includes ships sunk, foundered, wrecked, grounded, or otherwise lost during November 1844.

== 1 November ==
List of shipwrecks: 1 November 1844
Ship	State	Description
Aline	Bremen	The ship ran aground on the Nenbrock Sand. She was on a voyage from Bremen to Leer, Kingdom of Hanover.
Ann	United Kingdom	The ship was driven ashore and wrecked at Annagassan, County Louth. Her crew were rescued. She was on a voyage from Limerick to Liverpool, Lancashire.
Eclipse	United Kingdom	The ship struck an anchor and sank at Holyhead, Anglesey. She was on a voyage from Ipswich, Suffolk to Liverpool. She was refloated on 11 November and was beached.
Eliza	United Kingdom	The ship was driven ashore and severely damaged at Aldeburgh, Suffolk. Her crew were rescued. She was on a voyage from Maidstone, Kent to Goole, Yorkshire. Eliza was refloated on 12 November and resumed her voyage.
Endeavour	United Kingdom	The sloop was driven ashore and damaged at Holyhead.
Fairy Queen	United Kingdom	The ship was driven ashore and damaged at Holyhead.
George	United Kingdom	The smack was driven ashore and wrecked at Hubberstone Pill, Pembrokeshire. Her crew were rescued. She was on a voyage from Newport, Monmouthshire to Dublin. George was refloated on 6 November.
John and Mary	United Kingdom	The ship was driven ashore at Saint Thomas, Province of Canada, British North America. She was on a voyage from Quebec City, Province of Canada to Bristol, Gloucestershire. She was consequently condemned.
Osprey	United Kingdom	The ship ran aground on the Pennington Spit, off the Isle of Wight. She was on a voyage from Port Talbot, Glamorgan to London. She was refloated the next day.
Sea	United Kingdom	The ship was driven ashore in Bootle Bay. She was refloated the next day.
True Bess	United Kingdom	The ship was driven ashore in Derbyhaven Bay.
William Muir	United Kingdom	The ship was driven ashore in Derbyhaven Bay.

== 2 November ==
List of shipwrecks: 2 November 1844
Ship	State	Description
Alberdine	Kingdom of Hanover	The ship was driven ashore at North Shields, County Durham, United Kingdom. She was refloated on 6 November.
Ann	United Kingdom	The ship ran aground on the Nidingen Reef. She was on a voyage from Memel, Prussia to Newcastle upon Tyne, Northumberland. She was refloated and put in to "Skallaharun".
Busy	United Kingdom	The ship was severely damaged at Kingstown, County Dublin.
Capricorn	United Kingdom	The West Indiaman, a brig, was driven ashore at Kingstown, where she was subsequently severely damaged by fire. She was on a voyage from Saint Domingo to Liverpool, Lancashire.
Commerce	United Kingdom	The schooner was driven ashore at Kingstown.
Diana	United Kingdom	The ship was driven ashore and wrecked at Hornsea, East Riding of Yorkshire with the loss of three of the eleven people on board.
Duncannon	United Kingdom	The ship was driven ashore and wrecked at Bridlington, Yorkshire. Her crew were rescued by the coble Rechabito (United Kingdom). She was on a voyage from Saint Petersburg, Russian Empire to London. She was refloated on 12 November and taken in to Bridlington.
Eleanor	United Kingdom	The ship was driven ashore and sank at Porthdinllaen, Caernarfonshire. She had been refloated by 10 November.
Eleonora	Sweden	The ship was driven ashore at Hartlepool, County Durham. Her crew were rescued by the Hartlepool Lifeboat.
Elizabeth	United Kingdom	The ship was driven ashore and sank at Porthdinllaen. She was on a voyage from Cardiff, Glamorgan to Liverpool.
Elizabeth	United Kingdom	The ship was driven ashore at Porthdinllaen. She had been refloated by 10 November.
Ellen	United Kingdom	The sloop was driven ashore at Kingstown.
Elswick	United Kingdom	The ship was driven ashore at North Shields.
Fenna	Kingdom of Hanover	The koff was driven ashore at Cuxhaven. She was on a voyage from Hamburg to Bremen.
Friends	United Kingdom	The ship was driven ashore near Cardiff.
Friendschaft	Denmark	The koff was driven ashore and wrecked at Cuxhaven. She was on a voyage from the Eider to Altona.
Grahams	United Kingdom	The schooner was driven ashore at Warkworth, Northumberland. Her crew were rescued. She was on a voyage from Perth to Blyth, Northumberland. Grahams was refloated on 3 December and taken in to Warkworth.
Grenville Bay	United Kingdom	The ship was driven ashore at North Shields. She was later refloated.
Hercules	United Kingdom	The schooner was driven ashore and sank at Kingstown.
Industry	United Kingdom	The smack was run into and sunk off Cleethorpes Lincolnshire by Fox (United Kingdom).
Iris	United Kingdom	The brig was driven ashore and wrecked at Boulmer, Northumberland. Her crew were rescued by the Boulmer Lifeboat. She was on a voyage from Danzig to London.
Isabella	United Kingdom	The brig was driven ashore at Kingstown.
Johann Carll	Hamburg	The ship was driven ashore and wrecked at Aldeburgh, Suffolk, United Kingdom. Her crew were rescued.
Kingston	United Kingdom	The barque was driven ashore at Kingstown, where she was subsequently destroyed by fire. She was on a voyage from Liverpool, Lancashire to Mexico.
Margaret	United Kingdom	The ship was driven ashore at North Shields. She was later refloated.
Mary	United Kingdom	The schooner was driven ashore and damaged at Kingstown.
Mermaid	United Kingdom	The ship was driven ashore at Porthdinllaen. She had been refloated by 10 November.
Morgan	United Kingdom	The ship was driven ashore and sank at Porthdinllaen.
Newcastle	United Kingdom	The ship departed from Rügenwalde, Prussia for Glückstadt. No further trace, presumed foundered in the Baltic Sea with the loss of all hands.
New Gift	United Kingdom	The ship was driven ashore at Porthdinllaen. She had been refloated by 10 November.
Newport	United Kingdom	The ship was driven ashore 4 nautical miles (7.4 km) north west of Grimsby, Lincolnshire. She was on a voyage from Stettin to London. She was refloated on 7 November and taken in to Grimsby.
Oressa	United Kingdom	The ship was driven ashore and damaged at Carlingford, County Louth. She was on a voyage from Liverpool to Bombay, India.
Orion	United Kingdom	The ship was driven ashore at Porthdinllaen. She had been refloated by 10 November.
Phœnix	(United Kingdom of Great Britain and Ireland) Barbados	The schooner was driven ashore at St. John's, Antigua.
Rapid	United Kingdom	The ship was driven ashore at Porthdinllaen. She had been refloated by 10 November.
Rebecca and Maries	United Kingdom	The ship was driven ashore at the Mumbles, Glamorgan. She was on a voyage from Newport to Bantry, County Cork.
Rose	United Kingdom	The ship was wrecked at Skerries, County Dublin. All fifteen people on board were rescued. She was on a voyage from Quebec City, Province of Canada, British North America to Belfast, County Antrim.
Rosebank	United Kingdom	The ship was driven ashore north of Dublin. All seventeen people on board were rescued. She was on a voyage from Quebec City to Belfast.
Sarah Ann	United Kingdom	The brigantine was driven ashore near Cowden, Yorkshire. Her six crew survived. She was on a voyage from Gotland, Sweden to Sheerness, Kent. Sarah Ann floated off and was driven out to sea on 13 November.
Sarah Ann	United Kingdom	The ship was lost in Saint Austell Bay with the loss of all hands.
Shannon	United Kingdom	The cutter was wrecked at Balbriggan, County Dublin with the loss of three of her eight crew. She was on a voyage from Kingstown to Whitehaven, Cumberland.
Sovereign	United Kingdom	The ship was driven ashore at North Shields. She was later refloated.
Sovereign	United Kingdom	The ship was driven ashore and wrecked at Greystones, County Wicklow. Her crew were rescued. She was on a voyage from Liverpool to Yarmouth, Nova Scotia, British North America.
Torpedo	(United Kingdom of Great Britain and Ireland) Antigua	The drogher, a sloop, was wrecked at St. John's.
Traveller	United Kingdom	The ship was driven ashore at Southwold, Suffolk. Her crew were rescued. She was refloated on 9 November and taken in to Great Yarmouth, Norfolk.
Two Sisters	United Kingdom	The ship was driven ashore and damaged in Elbury Bay, Devon. She was on a voyage from South Shields, County Durham to Axmouth, Devon. She was refloated on 12 November and taken in to Brixham, Devon.
Waterlily	United Kingdom	The ship was driven ashore at Porthdinllaen. She had been refloated by 10 November.
William and Isabella	United Kingdom	The ship was driven ashore and severely damaged at Kingstown.
William and Mary	United Kingdom	The ship was driven ashore at Portland, Dorset. She was on a voyage from Weymouth, Dorset to London. Further damaged on 8 November, she was refloated on 12 November and taken in to Weymouth for repairs.

== 3 November ==
List of shipwrecks: 3 November 1844
Ship	State	Description
Active	United Kingdom	The brig was driven ashore at the Mumbles, Glamorgan, She was on a voyage from Exeter, Devon to Porthcawl, Glamorgan. She was refloated on 6 November.
HMRC Adelaide	Board of Customs	The ship was driven ashore and damaged at Weymouth. She was later refloated and taken in to Weymouth.
Ann Elizabeth	United Kingdom	The ship was driven ashore on the Goodwick Sands, Pembrokeshire. She was on a voyage from Chester, Cheshire to London. She was refloated on 9 November and taken in to Fishguard, Pembrokeshire.
Antelope	United Kingdom	The ship sank on the Goodwick Sands. She was on a voyage from Bangor to London. She was refloated on 10 January 1845 and taken in to Fishguard, Pembrokeshire the next day.
Antelope	Hamburg	The brig was driven ashore near Blankenese.
Apollo	France	The brig was driven ashore at the Mumbles. She was refloated on 6 November.
Cawdon	United Kingdom	The ship was driven out to sea from Waterford. Her crew were rescued.
Celia	United Kingdom	The brig was driven ashore and capsized at Hartlepool, County Durham. Six crew were rescued by the Seaton Lifeboat. She was on a voyage from Memel, Prussia to King's Lynn, Norfolk.
Clara	Prussia	The galeas ran aground on the Drogte, in the North Sea. She was on a voyage from Leba to Glückstadt, Duchy of Schleswig.
Cyrus	United Kingdom	The ship was abandoned off Fishguard. She was on a voyage from Bangor to London. Her crew reboarded her the next day and she continued her voyage.
Cyrus	United Kingdom	The ship was driven ashore at Portneuf, Province of Canada, British North America with the loss of three of her crew. She was on a voyage from Quebec City, Province of Canada to London.
Diana	Russia	The brig was driven ashore and wrecked near Atwick, Yorkshire, United Kingdom with the loss of three of the eight people on board. Survivors were rescued by rocket apparatus. Diana was on a voyage from Memel to London.
Eagle	United Kingdom	The ship was driven ashore at Miramichi, New Brunswick, British North America.
Elise	Hamburg	The schooner was driven ashore at Blankenese.
Eittina	Stettin	The ship was driven ashore at Eckernförde, Duchy of Holstein. She was on a voyage from Stettin to Hull, Yorkshire, United Kingdom.
Falk	Sweden	The schooner was driven ashore on Stronsay, Orkney Islands, United Kingdom. She was on a voyage from Sweden to Cette, Hérault, France. She was refloated and taken into Stromness, Orkney Islands.
Freden	Sweden	The schooner was wrecked in the North Sea 4 nautical miles (7.4 km) east south east of Flamborough Head, Yorkshire, United Kingdom with the loss of all but her captain. He was rescued by the brig Bolton (United Kingdom). Freden was on a voyage from Gothenburg to Isigny-sur-Mer, Calvados, France.
Gittina	Stettin	The ship was driven ashore at Eckernförde, Duchy of Schleswig. She was on a voyage from Stettin to Hull, Yorkshire.
Jan Isaac	Prussia	The ship was driven at Eckernförde. She was on a voyage from Bremen to Leer, Kingdom of Hanover.
Liberty	United Kingdom	The ship sprang a leak and was beached at Stromness. She was on a voyage from Onega, Russia to Dover, Kent.
Orissa	United Kingdom	The barque was driven ashore in Cranford Bay. She was on a voyage from Liverpool, Lancashire to Bombay, India. She was refloated on 6 November and taken in to the Clyde for repairs.
Raker	United Kingdom	The schooner was driven ashore and wrecked in Balcary Bay. She was on a voyage from Maryport, Cumberland to Ulverstone, Lancashire.

== 4 November ==
List of shipwrecks: 4 November 1844
Ship	State	Description
British Queen	United Kingdom	The ship ran aground on a rock in the River Shannon. She was on a voyage from Runcorn, Cheshire to Limerick.
Five Sostre	Norway	The ship was driven ashore on Læsø. Her crew were rescued. She was on a voyage from Arendal to Aarhus, Denmark.
Frau Anna Kelina	Hamburg	The ship struck the pier and was wrecked at Aberdeen, United Kingdom. Her crew were rescued. She was on a voyage from Altona to Aberdeen.
Frau Kea	Hanover	The sloop was driven ashore at Skegness, Lincolnshire, United Kingdom. Her three crew were rescued. She was on a voyage from Hamburg to Hull, Yorkshire.
Frau Jantje	Hamburg	The ship was driven ashore and wrecked 4 nautical miles (7.4 km) north of Hartlepool, County Durham, United Kingdom. Her crew were rescued. She was on a voyage from Hamburg to Newcastle upon Tyne, Northumberland, United Kingdom.
Jane Lowden	United Kingdom	The ship ran aground on the Long Craig Sandbank, south east of Inchkeith. Her crew were rescued. She was on a voyage from Saint Petersburg, Russia to Hull. She was refloated the next day and taken in to Leith, Lothian.
Marie	France	The ship was wrecked in Cayola Cove, near Les Sables-d'Olonne, Vendée with the loss of all but her captain from the seven people on board. She was on a voyage from Bordeaux, Gironde to Sunderland, County Durham.
Ninian	United Kingdom	The ship was damaged by fire at Limerick.
Oswald	Hamburg	The ship ran aground on the Cowndon Reef and was damaged. She was on a voyage from Hamburg to Bordeaux. She was refloated and put in to Royan, Charente-Maritime, France.

== 5 November ==
List of shipwrecks: 5 November 1844
Ship	State	Description
Bytown	United Kingdom	The ship was wrecked in the Magdalen Islands, Nova Scotia, British North America. Her crew were rescued. She was on a voyage from Liverpool, Lancashire to Miramichi, New Brunswick, British North America.
Friends	United Kingdom	The ship was driven ashore and damaged at Lowestoft, Suffolk. Her crew were rescued. She was refloated the next day.
Hebe	United Kingdom	The ship ran aground off Grimsby, Lincolnshire. She was on a voyage from Stettin to London. She was refloated on 8 November and resumed her voyage.
Lord Nelson	United Kingdom	The smack was driven ashore and wrecked at Lowestoft, Suffolk.
Telegraph	United Kingdom	The schooner ran aground on the Goodwin Sands, Kent. She was on a voyage from a Mediterranean port to Hamburg. She was refloated and resumed her voyage.

== 6 November ==
List of shipwrecks: 6 November 1844
Ship	State	Description
Aimable Marie	France	The ship was wrecked near Royan, Seine-Inférieure with the loss of four of her crew. She was on a voyage from Newcastle upon Tyne, Northumberland, United Kingdom to Bordeaux, Gironde.
Clarinda	United Kingdom	The ship was driven ashore at Ballyskillig, County Clare. She was on a voyage from Quebec City, Province of Canada, British North America to Dublin.
Clementine	France	The ship ran aground and was holed by an anchor at South Shields, County Durham, United Kingdom.
Cruickston Castle	United Kingdom	The ship was driven ashore and wrecked at New Carlisle, Province of Canada. Her crew were rescued.
Eclipse	United Kingdom	The ship was driven ashore at Great Yarmouth, Norfolk. SHe was refloated.
Emperor	United Kingdom	The ship was driven ashore at Hartlepool, County Durham. She was refloated on 8 November and taken in to Hartlepool.
Fanchievd	Norway	The ship was abandoned in the North Sea off Flamborough Head, Yorkshire, United Kingdom. Her crew were rescued by Chieftain (United Kingdom). Fanchievd was subsequently taken in to Sunderland, County Durham.
Gute Hoffnung	Hamburg	The ship was driven ashore near Seaton Snook, County Durham.
Jantina Hendrika	Netherlands	The ship was driven ashore and sank on "Norvo Island", Russia.
Leopoldina	Prussia	The brig was driven ashore near Hartlepool. She was refloated on 8 November and taken in to Hartlepool.
Mary Ann	United Kingdom	The schooner was driven ashore near Seaton Snook. She was refloated on 6 January 1845 and taken in to Hartlepool for repairs.
Neptune	Lübeck	The ship was driven ashore at Alexandria, Virginia. She was on a voyage from Barcelona, Spain to Alexandria.
Niord	Netherlands	The ship was lost off "Moholm". Her crew were rescued. She was on a voyage from Narva, Russia to Amsterdam, North Holland.
Peggy	United Kingdom	The ship was beached at Grimsby, Lincolnshire. She was on a voyage from Saint Petersburg, Russia to London.
Robert Burns	United Kingdom	The ship was driven ashore on Skerry Vow Point, Ireland. She was on a voyage from Saint Petersburg to Liverpool, Lancashire. She was refloated and put in to Lough Swilly, where she was beached.
Violet	United Kingdom	The ship was driven ashore at Great Yarmouth. She was refloated.
Vriendschap	Netherlands	The ship was driven ashore at Sea Palling, Norfolk. She was on a voyage from Groningen to London, United Kingdom.

== 7 November ==
List of shipwrecks: 7 November 1844
Ship	State	Description
Dove	(United Kingdom of Great Britain and Ireland) British North America	The ship was driven ashore at Bridgeport, Connecticut, United States. She was later refloated.
Elizabeth	United Kingdom	The ship was driven ashore at Craster, Northumberland with the loss of all hands.
Fortune	United Kingdom	The ship was wrecked on the Domesnes Reef. She was on a voyage from Riga, Russia to Newry, County Antrim.
HMS Raven	Royal Navy	The Lark-class cutter ran aground off Dungeness, Kent and was damaged. She was taken in to Sheerness, Kent for repairs.
Recovery	United Kingdom	The ship was driven ashore and wrecked at Poole, Dorset. Her crew were rescued. She was on a voyage from Cardiff, Glamorgan to London.
Roselle	United Kingdom	Lost.

== 8 November ==
List of shipwrecks: 8 November 1844
Ship	State	Description
Antæus	United Kingdom	The ship ran aground on the Gunfleet Sand, in the North Sea off the coast of Essex. Her crew were rescued. She was on a voyage from Wyborg, Grand Duchy of Finland to London. Antæus was subsequently destroyed by fire.
Chancellor	United States	The barque ran aground of Barbados. She was on a voyage from Newhaven, Connecticut, to Antigua. She was refloated and resumed her voyage.
Discovery	United Kingdom	The ship sank on the Hook Sand, in the English Channel off the coast of Dorset. Her crew were rescued. She was on a voyage from Cardiff, Glamorgan to London.
Earl Gower	United Kingdom	The schooner was driven ashore and wrecked at Balbriggan, County Dublin. Her crew were rescued. She was on a voyage from Liverpool, Lancashire to Newry, County Antrim. Earl Gower was refloated on 15 November and taken in to Balbriggan.
Germania	Stettin	The ship was wrecked in the Orne at Ouistreham, Calvados, France. She was on a voyage from Onega, Russia to Caen, Calvados.
James Mathieson	United Kingdom	The ship was driven ashore and wrecked at Wexford. Her crew were rescued. She was on a voyage from Liverpool to China.

== 9 November ==
List of shipwrecks: 9 November 1844
Ship	State	Description
Catherine	United Kingdom	The ship ran aground at Holyhead, Anglesey. She was on a voyage from Cardiff, Glamorgan to Liverpool, Lancashire.
Fortune	United Kingdom	The ship ran aground on the Domeness Reef and was wrecked. She was on a voyage from Quebec City, Province of Canada, British North America to Newry, County Antrim.
Jess	(United Kingdom of Great Britain and Ireland) New South Wales	The schooner was wrecked in the Richmond River. All on board were rescued.
John	(United Kingdom of Great Britain and Ireland) British North America	The ship ran aground on the Skerweather Sands, in the Bristol Channel. She was on a voyage from London to Cardiff and Llanelly, Glamorgan. She was refloated but consequently had to be beached. Subsequently taken in to Port Talbot, Glamorgan.
Margaret	United Kingdom	The ship ran aground at Saint Andrews, New Brunswick. She was on a voyage from London to Saint Andrew. She was refloated.
Seaflower	United Kingdom	The ship ran aground on the Woolpack Sand, in the North Sea, and sank.
Six Huzzas for the Queen	United Kingdom	The ship was abandoned in the North Sea off Blyth, Northumberland. Her five crew were rescued by a fishing vessel. She was on a voyage from Wisbech, Cambridgeshire to Leith, Lothian.
Spring	United Kingdom	The collier, a brig, collided with City of London (United Kingdom) and foundered in the North Sea off Orfordness, Suffolk with the loss of two of her crew. She was on a voyage from London to Sunderland, County Durham.
Tottenham	United Kingdom	The ship was driven ashore. She was refloated and towed into Crane Island, Province of Canada, British North America.
Turner	United Kingdom	The ship was abandoned off Blyth, Northumberland. She was on a voyage from Wisbech, Cambridgeshire to Leith, Lothian.

== 10 November ==
List of shipwrecks: 10 November 1844
Ship	State	Description
Antæus	United Kingdom	The ship was destroyed by fire at Wivenhoe, Essex. She was on a voyage from Wyborg, Grand Duchy of Finland to London.
Belle	United Kingdom	The ship was wrecked at the mouth of the River Dee with the loss of all but two of her crew. She was on a voyage from Waterford to Liverpool, Lancashire.
Blundell	United Kingdom	The ship was in collision with Feronia (United Kingdom) and sank off Liverpool. Her crew were rescued. She was on a voyage from Liverpool to Trinidad.
Brothers	United Kingdom	The sloop was driven ashore and wrecked at Whitby, Yorkshire. Her crew were rescued.
Earl of Leicester	United Kingdom	The ship was driven ashore at Deal, Kent. She was on a voyage from Odesa to London. She was refloated and taken in to Ramsgate, Kent.
Elizabeth	United Kingdom	The ship ran aground off Caldy Island, Pembrokeshire and was damaged. She was on a voyage from Neath, Glamorgan to Dublin. She was refloated and put in to Tenby, Pembrokeshire for repairs.
Europe	United Kingdom	The ship was wrecked at Downpatrick Head, County Down. Her crew survived. She was on a voyage from Narva, Russia to Liverpool, Lancashire.
Fortune	United Kingdom	The brig ran aground on the Great Burbo Bank, in Liverpool Bay.
Hermes	United Kingdom	The ship ran aground on the Herd Sand. Her crew were rescued by the North Shields Lifeboat. she was on a voyage from Hull, Yorkshire to South Shields, County Durham. Hermes was refloated the next day and taken in to South Shields.
Lady's Adventure	United Kingdom	The ship was lost off Liverpool with the loss of all but two of her crew.
Ora	(Russian Empire) Grand Duchy of Finland	The schooner was sunk by ice off Saint Petersburg, Russia. Her crew were rescued.
Pheasant	United Kingdom	The ship was driven ashore at Dinas Dinlle, Caernarfonshire. She was on a voyage from Newport, Monmouthshire to Belfast, County Antrim.
Sophia Frederica	Flag unknown	The ship was capsized and sunk by ice at Saint Petersburg.
Suffolk	United Kingdom	The schooner was driven ashore and wrecked south of Killala, County Louth. Her crew were rescued. She was on a voyage from London to Sligo.
Theodore	United Kingdom	The schooner ran aground on the Great Burbo Bank.
Troy	United Kingdom	The ship was driven ashore at Liverpool. She was on a voyage from New Orleans, Louisiana, United States to Liverpool.

== 11 November ==
List of shipwrecks: 11 November 1844
Ship	State	Description
Apollo	United Kingdom	The schooner was driven ashore and wrecked at Boulmer, Northumberland. Her crew were rescued. She was on a voyage from Sunderland, County Durham to Montrose, Forfarshire.
Blues	United Kingdom	The ship was in collision with a brig and was abandoned in the North Sea. Her crew were rescued. She was on a voyage from Middlesbrough, Yorkshire to London.
Cato	United Kingdom	The ship was abandoned in the Atlantic Ocean 600 nautical miles (1,100 km) west south west of the Isles of Scilly. Her crew were rescued. She was on a voyage from Quebec City, Province of Canada, British North America to Plymouth, Devon.
Cinderella	United Kingdom	The ship ran aground on the Sheringham Shoal, in the North Sea off the coast of Norfolk. She was on a voyage from Sunderland to London. She was refloated and taken in to Great Yarmouth, Norfolk.
David	United Kingdom	The ship was driven ashore and wrecked at Crackington Haven, Cornwall. Her crew were rescued. She was on a voyage from Newport, Monmouthshire to Stettin.
Deptford	United Kingdom	The ship was driven ashore at St. Mawes, Cornwall. She was refloated.
Deux Pauline	France	The ship was driven ashore near Havre de Grâce, Seine-Inférieure. Her crew were rescued. She was on a voyage from Cap-Haïtien, Haiti to Havre de Grâce.
Economist	United Kingdom	The ship was driven ashore at Port Talbot, Glamorgan. She was refloated the next day.
Fame	United Kingdom	The ship capsized at Lancaster, Lancashire. She was refloated on 15 November.
Flora	United Kingdom	The schooner ran aground on the Gunfleet Sand, in the North Sea off the coast of Essex. She was on a voyage from Hamburg to London.
Gertrude	United Kingdom	The brigantine was wrecked on "Cape Bantiqui".
Gough	United Kingdom	The ship was driven ashore at Liverpool, Lancashire. She was on a voyage from Blakeney to Liverpool.
Harmony	United Kingdom	The sloop was driven ashore in Loch Ryan. She was refloated.
Jane and Jenny	(United Kingdom of Great Britain and Ireland) Isle of Man	The smack was wrecked at Bispham with Norbreck, Lancashire with the loss of four of the twelve people on board. She was on a voyage from Ardglass, County Down to Peel.
Knysna	United Kingdom	The ship was driven ashore and wrecked at Crackington Haven. Her crew were rescued. She was on a voyage from Westport, County Mayo to Bristol, Gloucestershire.
Lord Leicester	United Kingdom	The ship was driven ashore on the Kent coast. She was on a voyage from Odesa to London. She was refloated and taken in to Ramsgate, Kent.
Lukas Wigchie	Netherlands	The ship ran aground at North Shields, County Durham, United Kingdom. She was on a voyage from North Shields to Amsterdam, North Holland. She was refloated and resumed her voyage.
Magnet	United Kingdom	The ship was driven ashore at St. Mawes. She was refloated.
Matthew Plumer	United Kingdom	The ship was driven ashore at St. Mawes. She was refloated.
New Glasgow	(United Kingdom of Great Britain and Ireland) British North America	The ship was wrecked on Langlois Island with the loss of all but five of her crew.
Nouvelle Elise	France	The brig foundered in the Baie de Somme with the loss of all four crew. She was on a voyage from Bordeaux, Gironde to Abbeville, Somme.
Orafing	(Russian Empire) Grand Duchy of Finland	The schooner was holed by ice and sank off Saint Petersburg, Russia. Her crew were rescued.
Pilot	United Kingdom	The ship was wrecked on the Whitton Sand, in the North Sea. Her crew were rescued. She was on a voyage from Maldon, Essex to Goole, Yorkshire.
Polgooth	United Kingdom	The ship was driven ashore and wrecked on Breaksea Point, Glamorgan. She was on a voyage from Málaga, Spain to Bristol, Gloucestershire.
Robert Boyle	United Kingdom	The ship was driven ashore at Troon, Ayrshire.
San Juan Baptista	Spain	The ship was wrecked on "Garuna Island", Spanish East Indies with the loss of her captain.
Shamrock	United Kingdom	The sloop was driven ashore in Morecambe Bay. She was on a voyage from Dundalk, County Louth to Lancaster, Lancashire. She was refloated and put in to Fleetwood, Lancashire, where she sank.
Sophia Frederica	Russia	The ship was run into by Dee (United Kingdom) and capsized at Saint Petersburg. She was later refloated.
Swallow	United Kingdom	The sloop sank at Lancaster. Her four crew survived. She was on a voyage from Drogheda, County Louth to Lancaster.
Three Sisters	United Kingdom	The smack sprang a leak and foundered off the Mull of Galloway, Ayrshire. Her crew took to the boat; they were later rescued by Duke of Atholl (United Kingdom). Three Sisters was on a voyage from Killyleagh, County Down to Whitehaven, Cumberland.
Two Brothers	United Kingdom	The ship was wrecked on the Whitby Rock. Her crew were rescued.
Tyne	United Kingdom	The ship ran aground on the Haisborough Sands, in the North Sea off the coast of Norfolk. She was on a voyage from London to Sunderland. She was refloated and put in to Great Yarmouth.
William	United Kingdom	The schooner was wrecked near the Corsewall Lighthouse, Wigtownshire with the loss of a crew member. She was on a voyage from Belfast, County Antrim to Troon, Ayrshire.
William	United Kingdom	The ship was destroyed by fire at Isle Martin, Ross-shire.

== 12 November ==
List of shipwrecks: 12 November 1844
Ship	State	Description
Briton	United Kingdom	The troopship, a barque, was wrecked on South Andaman Island. All 432 people on board survived. She was on a voyage from Sydney, New South Wales to Calcutta, India.
Frederike	Stralsund	The schooner was driven ashore on Ruden, Prussia.
Indien	France	The barque was wrecked on the Pauela Rocks, 12 nautical miles (22 km) south west of Buenos Aires, Argentina.
Mary O'Brien	(United Kingdom of Great Britain and Ireland) British North America	The schooner was driven ashore and wrecked at Halifax, Nova Scotia.
Nora Creina	United Kingdom	The ship was run into and sunk in the King Road, off the coast of Somerset, by George (United Kingdom). Her crew were rescued.
Paulina	Hamburg	The galiot was driven ashore at South Shields, County Durham, United Kingdom. She was refloated but consequently had to be beached.
Runnymede	United Kingdom	The troopship was wrecked on South Andaman Island with the loss of one of the 199 people on board. She was on a voyage from Pulau Pinang, Straits Settlements to Calcutta, India.
Stork	United Kingdom	The ship was wrecked on the Whale Crown Rock, in the South China Sea. She was on a voyage from China to Singapore.
Waverley	United Kingdom	The ship was driven ashore and severely damaged at Cape Canso, Nova Scotia, British North America. She was refloated the next day and taken in to Pictou, Nova Scotia.

== 13 November ==
List of shipwrecks: 13 November 1844
Ship	State	Description
Amelia	United Kingdom	The ship foundered in the Irish Sea off the Point of Ayre, Isle of Man during a squall.
Boconie	Spain	The ship was driven ashore near Cardiff, Glamorgan, United Kingdom. She was on a voyage from Málaga to Newport, Monmouthshire, United Kingdom.
Duddon	United Kingdom	The ship sprang a leak and was beached at Poole, Dorset. She was on a voyage from Newcastle upon Tyne, Northumberland to Porto, Portugal.
Eleanor	United Kingdom	The ship was wrecked on the Scroby Sands, Norfolk. She was on a voyage from Sunderland, County Durham to London.
Fairy Queen	United Kingdom	The ship was driven ashore and wrecked at Saunton, Devon. She was on a voyage from Liverpool, Lancashire to the Ionian Islands.
Jean Catherine	(United Kingdom of Great Britain and Ireland) British North America	The ship was abandoned at sea. Her crew were rescued.
Lucien Josephine	France	The ship was wrecked on the Scroby Sands. Her crew were rescued. She was on a voyage from South Shields, County Durham to Dunkirk, Nord.
Maid of the Mist	(United Kingdom of Great Britain and Ireland) British North America	The schooner was driven ashore at Halifax, Nova Scotia. She was on a voyage from Saint John, New Brunswick to Halifax.
Orestes	Spain	The brig was driven ashore and wrecked at Puerta Brava, Uruguay. She was on a voyage from Barcelona to Buenos Aires, Argentina.
St. George	United Kingdom	The ship sank off Conwy, Caernarfonshire with the loss of all hands.
Varchwal	United Kingdom	The ship was driven ashore at Conwy with the loss of her captain. She was on a voyage from Bangor to Liverpool.

== 14 November ==
List of shipwrecks: 14 November 1844
Ship	State	Description
Borough	United Kingdom	The ship was driven ashore west of the Bolderāja Lighthouse, Russia. Her crew were rescued.
Britannia	United Kingdom	The sloop was driven ashore 2 nautical miles (3.7 km) north of Bridlington, Yorkshire. She was on a voyage from Hull, Yorkshire to Whitby, Yorkshire. She was refloated on 17 November and taken in to Bridlington.
Caighan	United Kingdom	The ship was driven ashore and wrecked at "Sandick", Isle of Man. Her crew were rescued.
Carron	United Kingdom	The ship was abandoned off Riga, Russia.
Duddon	United Kingdom	The ship was driven ashore at Poole, Dorset. She was on a voyage from Newcastle upon Tyne, Northumberland to Porto, Portugal.
Euphemia	United Kingdom	The ship was driven ashore west of the Bolderāja Lighthouse. Her crew were rescued.
Europe	United Kingdom	The ship was wrecked on Downpatrick Head, County Down. Her crew were rescued. She was on a voyage from Narva, Russia to Liverpool, Lancashire.
Fanny	United Kingdom	The ship foundered in the North Sea off Hartlepool, County Durham. Her crew were rescued by Samuel and Sarah (United Kingdom).
Fanny Peat	United Kingdom	The schooner was wrecked on the Sgeir-ma-Moulr Rocks, between the Isle of Harris and the Isle of Skye, Outer Hebrides. Her five crew were rescued. She was on a voyage from Liverpool, Lancashire to Danzig.
Firefly	United Kingdom	The brig was in collision with the steamship Britannia (United Kingdom) and foundered off Anglesey with the loss of a crew member. Survivors were rescued by Britannia. Firefly was on a voyage from Liverpool to Africa. The wreck was towed into the River Mersey on 23 November and was beached at Seacombe, Cheshire before being taken in to Liverpool.
Glengarrif	United Kingdom	The brig was wrecked near "Goasacucleo" with the loss of all but six of her crew. She was on a voyage from Veracruz, Mexico to Laguna.
Jare	United Kingdom	The ship was abandoned off Riga.
Kaighan	United Kingdom	The ship was wrecked at Castletown, Isle of Man. Her crew were rescued.
Maria Oletta	Norway	The brig was abandoned off Riga.
Toms	United Kingdom	The ship ran aground on the Maplin Sand, in the North Sea off the coast of Essex. She was on a voyage from Sunderland, County Durham to London. Toms was refloated on 16 November and resumed her voyage.
Valleyfield	United Kingdom	The ship was abandoned off Riga.

== 15 November ==
List of shipwrecks: 15 November 1844
Ship	State	Description
Active	(Russian Empire) Grand Duchy of Finland	The ship ran aground on the Insand, in the North Sea. She was on a voyage from Raahe to Naples, Kingdom of the Two Sicilies. She was refloated.
Advice	United Kingdom	The schooner was driven ashore at Freswick, Caithness. Her crew were rescued. She was on a voyage from Brora, Sutherland to Thurso, Caithness. She was refloated on 20 November.
Anna Juliana	Kingdom of Hanover	The ship ran aground on the Putgarden Reef. She was on a voyage from Greifswald to London, United Kingdom.
Baldyr	Norway	The ship was wrecked on Gros Farder. Her crew were rescued.
Beata	Sweden	The sloop was wrecked off "Carlsvig". Her crew were rescued.
Britannia	(United Kingdom of Great Britain and Ireland) British North America	The sloop was wrecked at Cape George, Nova Scotia. She was on a voyage from Halifax, Nova Scotia to Miramichi, New Brunswick.
Feeden	(Russian Empire) Grand Duchy of Finland	The ship ran aground on the Insand. She was on a voyage from Raahe to Genoa, Kingdom of Sardinia. She was refloated.
Guiana	United Kingdom	The ship was driven ashore and wrecked on Furze Island, County Cork. Her crew were rescued.
Hope	United Kingdom	The ship was driven ashore in the Beresoff Islands, Grand Duchy of Finland.
Indus	United Kingdom	The ship was driven ashore and severely damaged at Blakeney, Norfolk. She was refloated the next day and taken in to Blakeney.
James Brown	United Kingdom	The ship was in collision with Duke of Cambridge (United Kingdom) and foundered off Strangford, County Antrim. Her crew were rescued. She was on a voyage from Donegal to Liverpool, Lancashire.
James and Thomas	United Kingdom	The sloop was driven ashore at Aberdeen. She was on a voyage from Newcastle upon Tyne, Northumberland to Aberdeen. She was later refloated and taken in to Aberdeen.
Mary	United Kingdom	The ship was damaged by fire at Liverpool, Lancashire.
Pilot	United Kingdom	The ship was driven ashore at Helsingør, Denmark. She was on a voyage from Riga, Russia to London. She was refloated on 20 November and resumed her voyage.
President	United Kingdom	The ship was driven ashore and wrecked in Lough Foyle with the loss of a crew member. She was on a voyage from Cardiff, Glamorgan to Londonderry.
Ranger	United Kingdom	The smack collided with a brig and sank in the River Thames with the loss of her captain. Two crew members were rescued. She was on a voyage from Goole, Yorkshire to London.
Risico	Netherlands	The ship was wrecked at "Winga", Sweden. Her crew were rescued.
Varchwat	Danzig	The ship was wrecked near Conwy, Caernarfonshire, United Kingdom with the loss of her captain. She was on a voyage from Danzig to Liverpool, Lancashire, United Kingdom.
Warlock	United Kingdom	The ship ran aground at South Shields, County Durham. She was on a voyage from South Shields to Calcutta, India. She was refloated.

== 16 November ==
List of shipwrecks: 16 November 1844
Ship	State	Description
Catharine	United Kingdom	The ship was driven ashore and wrecked at Thisted, Denmark. Her crew were rescued. She was on a voyage from Stockton-on-Tees, County Durham to Swinemünde, Prussia.
Elise	France	The ship ran aground on the Kentish Knock and sank with the loss of four of her six crew. She was on a voyage from Sunderland, County Durham to Boulogne, Pas-de-Calais.
England	United Kingdom	The ship ran aground at Carkabeg, County Cork. She was on a voyage from Cork to Ichaboe Island, Portuguese West Africa. She was refloated the next day and resumed her voyage.
Henriette Christina	Denmark	The ship was driven ashore on Sylt, Duchy of Holstein in a capsized condition.
John Dalton	United Kingdom	The ship was driven ashore at Cape Negro, Nova Scotia, British North America with the loss of one life. She was on a voyage from Sydney, New South Wales to London. HMS Frolic, HMS Spider, and HMS Viper (all Royal Navy) were sent to assist in refloating her.
John Metcalf	United Kingdom	The schooner sank at Groomsport, County Down. Her crew were rescued.
Leopold	Greifswald	The ship was wrecked on Læsø, Denmark. She was on a voyage from Peterhead, Aberdeenshire, United Kingdom to Stettin.
Lykens Prove	Duchy of Holstein	The ship foundered in the North Sea off Föhr.
Mayflower	United Kingdom	The ship ran aground on the Shoebury Knock Sand, in the Thames Estuary off the coast of Essex. She was on a voyage from Seaham, County Durham to London. She was refloated and resumed her voyage.=
Orion	United Kingdom	The schooner was driven ashore at Donaghadee, County Down. She was on a voyage from Mulroy Bay to Liverpool, Lancashire. She was refloated and towed in to Belfast, County Antrim.
St. Johannes	Sweden	The ship was driven ashore and sank on the west coast of Gotland. She was on a voyage from Ystad to Stockholm.
Themistocles	France	The ship was wrecked near Gallipoli, Ottoman Empire. Her crew were rescued. She was on a voyage from Odesa to Marseille, Bouches-du-Rhône.

== 17 November ==
List of shipwrecks: 17 November 1844
Ship	State	Description
Casimir	France	The lugger ran aground on the Vogel Sand, in the North Sea and was damaged. She was on a voyage from Amsterdam, North Holland, Netherlands to Hamburg. She was refloated and taken in to Cuxhaven for repairs.
Cosmolitano	Russia	The ship was in collision with Harebell (United Kingdom) and sank in the Dardanelles. Her crew were rescued. She was on a voyage from Odesa to Marseille, Bouches-du-Rhône, France.
Elizabeth	(United Kingdom of Great Britain and Ireland) New South Wales	The ship was driven ashore in Portland Bay.
Elizabeth	United Kingdom	The ship was sunk by ice at Taganrog, Russia.
Enigheden	Denmark	The ship was wrecked off Læsø. She was on a voyage from Kragerø, Norway to Aalborg.
Errichitte	Kingdom of the Two Sicilies	The ship was driven ashore at Margate, Kent, United Kingdom. She was on a voyage from Hull, Yorkshire, United Kingdom to Naples.
Fame	United Kingdom	The ship departed from Liverpool, Lancashire for Dordrecht, South Holland, Netherlands. No further trace, presumed foundered with the loss of all hands.
Sally Ann	(United Kingdom of Great Britain and Ireland) New South Wales	The whaler was driven ashore and wrecked in Portland Bay.
Stephamy	Russia	The brig ran aground off "Lappen", Denmark. She was refloated the next day.
Thomas	United Kingdom	The ship ran aground and was wrecked on the Outer Skerry, Orkney Islands. Her crew were rescued.
Thomas Laurie	United Kingdom	The ship sprang a leak and was abandoned off Ichaboe Island, Portuguese West Africa. Her crew were rescued by Crescent (United Kingdom). She was on a voyage from Ichaboe Island to Cork.
Urgent	United Kingdom	The barque was driven ashore at Caernarfon. Her crew were rescued. She was on a voyage from Canton, China to Liverpool. She was refloated on 24 November and towed in to Liverpool that day.

== 18 November ==
List of shipwrecks: 18 November 1844
Ship	State	Description
Albion	(United Kingdom of Great Britain and Ireland) British North America	The schooner was wrecked on the Thrump Cap Shoal.
Lewisham	United Kingdom	The brig ran aground on the Upgang Rock. She was refloated and resumed her voyage.
Oswego	United Kingdom	The ship ran aground on the Goodwin Sands, Kent. She was on a voyage from Hull, Yorkshire to New York, United States. She was refloated and anchored off Margate, Kent.
Pictou	United Kingdom	The brig was run down and sunk in the North Sea 5 nautical miles (9.3 km) off the Dudgeon Lightship ( Trinity House) by the brig Acklam (United Kingdom). Her crew were rescued by Acklam.

== 19 November ==
List of shipwrecks: 10 November 1844
Ship	State	Description
Autumn	United Kingdom	The brig was driven ashore north of Flamborough Head, Yorkshire. She was refloated and taken in tow for Scarborough, North Yorkshire by Ark (United Kingdom) but consequently foundered about 6 nautical miles (11 km) off the coast. Her crew were rescued.
Cornelia	Denmark	The ship ran aground and sank off Skagen with the loss of her captain.
Defiance	United Kingdom	The ship ran aground at "Newton Snaak", County Durham.
Elizabeth	(United Kingdom of Great Britain and Ireland) New South Wales	The cutter ran aground at the mouth of the Bellinger River.
Prince George	United Kingdom	The ship was driven ashore in the Saint Lawrence River. She was on a voyage from Quebec City, Province of Canada, British North America to an English port.
Ranger	United Kingdom	The brig was driven ashore north of Flamborough Head. She was refloated.

== 20 November ==
List of shipwrecks: 20 November 1844
Ship	State	Description
Crispin	United Kingdom	The schooner was driven ashore on the Hauxley Rocks, Northumberland. She was refloated.
Deo Gloria	Prussia	The ship ran aground off "Hornbeck". She was refloated and put in to Helsingør, Denmark.
Merchant	United States	The ship ran aground on the Pen Patch, off the coast of Pennsylvania.
Queen of Scotland	United Kingdom	The paddle steamer ran aground on the Pagensand, in the North Sea. She was later refloated and taken in to Hamburg, where she arrived on 27 November.
Zwey Gebroeder	Netherlands	The ship foundered in the Zuyder Zee off Stavoren, Friesland. Her crew were rescued. She was on a voyage from Hamburg to Amsterdam, North Holland.

== 21 November ==
List of shipwrecks: 21 November 1844
Ship	State	Description
Aurora	United Kingdom	The ship was driven ashore on Gotland, Sweden. She was on a voyage from Saint Petersburgh, Russia to Bristol, Gloucestershire. She was refloated and resumed her voyage.
Bolder	Russia	The ship was driven ashore on the Hanko Peninsula, Grand Duchy of Finland. She was on a voyage from Saint Petersburgh to Turku, Grand Duchy of Finland.
Carl Alexander	Russia	The ship was driven ashore on the Hanko Peninsula. She was on a voyage from Saint Petersburgh to Turku.
Flora	Russia	The ship was driven ashore on the Hanko Peninsula. She was on a voyage from Saint Petersburgh to Pori, Grand Duchy of Finland.
James	United Kingdom	The ferry, a steamship was in collision with Royalist (United Kingdom) in the River Mersey and was severely damaged. She was on a voyage from Liverpool, Lancashire to Birkenhead, Cheshire. Some passengers drowned.
Lord Coke	United Kingdom	The ship was driven ashore east of Wells-next-the-Sea, Norfolk. She was refloated on 23 November and taken in to Wells-next-the-Sea.
Tweed	United Kingdom	The ship was wrecked on Point Escuminac, New Brunswick, British North America. Her crew were rescued. She was on a voyage from Quebec City, Province of Canada, British North America to Hull, Yorkshire.

== 22 November ==
List of shipwrecks: 22 November 1844
Ship	State	Description
Civility	United Kingdom	The ship ran aground at Quebec City, Province of Canada, British North America.
Hannah	United Kingdom	The ship ran aground at Helsingør, Denmark. She was on a voyage from Saint Petersburg, Russia to Hull, Yorkshire. She was refloated and resumed her voyage.
Pocahontas	United Kingdom	The ship ran aground on the Shipwash Sand, in the North Sea off the coast of Essex. She was on a voyage from Rotterdam, South Holland, Netherlands to Liverpool, Lancashire. She was refloated and resumed her voyage.
William Henry	United Kingdom	The ship struck rocks off Campeche, Mexico. She was abandoned four days later with the loss of all but four of her crew. She was on a voyage from Liverpool to Veracruz, Mexico.

== 23 November ==
List of shipwrecks: 23 November 1844
Ship	State	Description
Conservative	United Kingdom	The brig was wrecked on the Long Key Shoal. Her crew were rescued. She was on a voyage from Galveston, Texas Republic to Liverpool, Lancashire.
Daphne	United Kingdom	The ship sank off Ichaboe Island, Portuguese West Africa. She was on a voyage from Ichaboe Island to Blyth, Northumberland.
Providentia	Danzig	The ship ran aground, capsized and sank in the River Tyne. She was on a voyage from Chatham, Kent, United Kingdom to Wolgast, Prussia. She was refloated on 26 November and taken in to Newcastle upon Tyne, Northumberland, United Kingdom for repairs.

== 24 November ==
List of shipwrecks: 24 November 1844
Ship	State	Description
Clara and Emma	United Kingdom	The ship was abandoned in the Atlantic Ocean. Her crew were rescued. She was on a voyage from Truxillo to London.
Elizabeth	(United Kingdom of Great Britain and Ireland) South Australia	The schooner was beached and wrecked in Portland Bay. all on board survived.
Gratitude	United Kingdom	The ship ran aground on the Gunfleet Sand, in the North Sea off the coast of Essex. She was on a voyage from Arkhangelsk, Russia to London. She was refloated on 26 November and resumed her voyage.
Sally Anne	(United Kingdom of Great Britain and Ireland) New South Wales	The schooner was driven ashore and wrecked in Portland Bay.
Thomas	United Kingdom	The brig was wrecked on The Skerries, Orkney Islands. Her crew were rescued.

== 26 November ==
List of shipwrecks: 26 November 1844
Ship	State	Description
Apollo	United Kingdom	The ship was driven ashore and damaged at Plymouth, Devon.
Deux Frères	France	The ship was wrecked at Le Pouldu, Finistère.
Fortune	(United Kingdom of Great Britain and Ireland) British North America	The ship struck a rock and was beached. Her crew were rescued. She was on a voyage from Sydney, Nova Scotia to Halifax, Nova Scotia.
Maria	France	The ship was wrecked at Le Pouldu.
United States	United States	The ship departed from Liverpool, Lancashire, United Kingdom for New York. No further trace, presumed foundered with the loss of all hands.
Victoria	United Kingdom	The smack was wrecked on The Skerries, in the Irish Sea off the coast of County Antrim. Her crew were rescued. She was on a voyage from Liverpool to Portrush, County Antrim.

== 27 November ==
List of shipwrecks: 27 November 1844
Ship	State	Description
Anne Metcalfe	United Kingdom	The ship was driven ashore at Petruchin Point, 12 nautical miles (22 km) from Taganrog, Russia and was abandoned by her crew. She subsequently became a wreck.
Augusta	United Kingdom	The barque ran aground on the Cannon Rock, in the Irish Sea. All on board were rescued. She was on a voyage from Dalhousie, New Brunswick, British North America to the Clyde. Augusta was subsequently towed in to Greenock, Renfrewshire.
British Queen	United Kingdom	The ship was driven ashore at Petruchin Point. She subsequently became a wreck.
Cambridge	(United Kingdom of Great Britain and Ireland) British North America	The brig was driven ashore near Digby, Nova Scotia with the loss of seven of her crew. She was on a voyage from Saint John, New Brunswick to Dundalk, County Louth.
Countess of Dunmore	United Kingdom	The ship was driven ashore at Petruchin Point and was abandoned by her crew. She subsequently capsized.
Freedom	(United Kingdom of Great Britain and Ireland) British North America	The schooner was wrecked on the Split Rock, in the Bay of Fundy. Her crew were rescued.
Hants	United Kingdom	The ship was driven ashore at Petruchin Point and was abandoned by her crew. She subsequently became a wreck.
Robert. A. Parke	United Kingdom	The barque was driven ashore and severely damaged in Blacksod Bay. Her crew were rescued. She was on a voyage from Quebec City, Province of Canada, British North America to Belmullet, County Mayo.
Zelre	France	The brig was destroyed by fire at "Goree", Africa.

== 28 November ==
List of shipwrecks: 28 November 1844
Ship	State	Description
Alexandrina Matilda	Russia	The ship was driven ashore on "Tytler's Island" and was abandoned by her crew. She was on a voyage from Narva to Hull, Yorkshire, United Kingdom.
Blyth	United Kingdom	The sloop was driven ashore at Redcar, Yorkshire. She was refloated the next day.
Cambrian	United Kingdom	The ship was driven ashore and broke her back at Hull.
Chieftain	United Kingdom	The ship was driven ashore on Rossall Point, Lancashire. She was on a voyage from Quebec City, Province of Canada, British North America to Glasgow, Renfrewshire. She was refloated and put in to Lancaster Bay.
Only Son	United States	The ship was wrecked on the Salt Key. Her crew were rescued. She was on a voyage from a port in North Carolina to Jamaica.

== 29 November ==
List of shipwrecks: 29 November 1844
Ship	State	Description
Madison	United Kingdom	The ship ran aground on the North Bank, in Liverpool Bay and was damaged. She was on a voyage from Liverpool, Lancashire to New Orleans, Louisiana, United States. She was refloated and put back to Liverpool.

== 30 November ==
List of shipwrecks: 30 November 1844
Ship	State	Description
HMS Resistance	Royal Navy	The troopship ran aground at Cork.

== Unknown date ==
List of shipwrecks: Unknown date in November 1844
Ship	State	Description
Borneo	United Kingdom	The ship was abandoned in the Atlantic Ocean before 7 November.
Catharine	United Kingdom	The ship was damaged at Ichaboe Island, Portuguese West Africa before 25 November. She was consequently condemned.
Charlotte	(United Kingdom of Great Britain and Ireland) British North America	The ship foundered in the Bay of Seven Islands before 25 November. Her crew were rescued. She was on a voyage from Prince Edward Island to Quebec City, Province of Canada.
Cohasselt	United States	The ship was driven ashore at Buceo, Uruguay between 24 and 26 November.
Cornelia	United Kingdom	The sloop was lost off the coast of Caithness. Her crew survived.
Crusader	United Kingdom	The schooner was lost at "Grand Baton" before 2 November. Her crew were rescued.
Curlew	(United Kingdom of Great Britain and Ireland) British North America	The brig was driven ashore on the "South Key" before 25 November.
Enigheten	Sweden	The sloop was wrecked before 16 November.
Familien	Norway	The brig was abandoned in the North Sea between 3 and 7 November. She was towed in to Sunderland, County Durham, United Kingdom.
Hannah	United States	The schooner was wrecked whilst on a voyage from Oswego, Illinois, to Detroit, Michigan.
Ilzaide	United Kingdom	The ship ran aground on the East Bank, off the Kent coast. She was refloated on 24 November and sailed to London the next day.
Iris	United Kingdom	The ship was run down and sunk in the North Sea off the coast of County Durham between 11 and 15 November.
John and Mary	United Kingdom	The ship was abandoned in the Atlantic Ocean before 11 November.
Julie Marguerite	(United Kingdom of Great Britain and Ireland) British North America	The schooner was wrecked at Gaspe, Province of Canada before 25 November.
Lady of St Kilda	United Kingdom	The schooner was wrecked on a coral reef in Tahiti.
Lotus	United Kingdom	The ship was lost at Ichaboe Island before 5 November.
Lucky Adventure	United Kingdom	The schooner was wrecked with the loss of all but two of her crew.
Maggie Lauder	United Kingdom	The ship was driven ashore near Southerness, Kirkcudbrightshire. her crew were rescued. She was on a voyage from Glencaple, Dumfriesshire to Maryport, Cumberland.
Majestic	(United Kingdom of Great Britain and Ireland) British North America	The ship was lost on the Isle of Pines, Cuba before 11 November. Her crew were rescued.
Meloney	(United Kingdom of Great Britain and Ireland) British North America	The ship was driven ashore at Canso, Nova Scotia before 12 November. She was on a voyage from Pictou to Pugwash.
Prins Oscar	Sweden	The galeass was wrecked before 16 November.
San Nicholas	Spain	The ship was lost in the Province of Batangas, Spanish East Indies.
San Pedro	Spain	The ship was lost in the Province of Batangas.
Spray	United States	The ship was abandoned in the Atlantic Ocean. Her crew were rescued by Facio (Spain). Spray was on a voyage from Wilmington, Delaware, to Antigua.
St. Pierre	United Kingdom	The schooner was wrecked at Gaspé before 25 November.
Thomas	United Kingdom	The ship was driven ashore in the Sound of Hoy, where she became a wreck on 27 November.
Wilhelm Ludwig	Bremen	The brig was wrecked in the Mangsee Islands. Her crew were rescued by Griffin (United Kingdom).
William	United Kingdom	The sloop foundered in the North Sea 18 nautical miles (33 km) south south east of the mouth of the Humber. Three crew were seen on the wreck by Pansey (United Kingdom), which refused to save them.
Zante	United Kingdom	The ship was driven ashore at Tampico, Mexico between 23 and 30 November.
