= List of ship launches in 1819 =

The list of ship launches in 1819 includes a chronological list of ships launched in 1819.

Date	Ship	Class / type	Builder	Location	Country	Notes
12 January	Blonde	Apollo-class frigate		Deptford Dockyard	United Kingdom	For Royal Navy.
27 January	Menai	Frigate		Chatham Dockyard	United Kingdom	For Royal Navy.
28 January	Catherine	East Indiaman		Blackwall Yard	United Kingdom	For British East India Company.
January	Alacrity	Cherokee-class brig-sloop		Deptford Dockyard	United Kingdom	For Royal Navy.
2 February	Eclipse	Paddle steamer	D. Brent	Rotherhithe	United Kingdom	For F. Bigg, J. Heighington, Squire Knight and others.
10 February	Brisk	Cherokee-class brig-sloop		Chatham Dockyard	United Kingdom	For Royal Navy.
13 February	York	East Indiaman	Philip Laing	Southwick	United Kingdom	For British East India Company.
28 February	Cicero	Greenland whaler	Edward Gibson	Hull	United Kingdom	For private owner.
1 March	Columbus	Ship of the line		Washington Navy Yard	United States	For United States Navy.
6 March	Mary	Brig	Robert W. Purchas	Chepstow	United Kingdom	For private owner.
13 March	Asia	Merchantman	A. Hall & Co.	Aberdeen	United Kingdom	For private owner.
17 March	Andromeda	Merchantman		Sunderland	United Kingdom	For British East India Company.
22 March	Aquatic	Brig	J. & H. Smith	Gainsborough	United Kingdom	For private owner.
31 March	Hooghly	Full-rigged ship	Gordon	Deptford	United Kingdom	For John W. Buckle.
March	Patriot	Snow			United Kingdom	For private owner.
March	Streatlam Castle	Merchantman	J Watson & Mills	Sunderland	United Kingdom	For Mr. Scarfield.
March	Talbot	Paddle steamer	John Wood & Co.	Port Glasgow	United Kingdom	For Thomas Boyd, Alexander Law and David Napier.
10 April	Montrose	West Indiaman	John James & Co.	Liverpool	United Kingdom	For private owner.
15 April	Erin-go-Bragh	Paddle steamer	John Wood & Co.	Greenock	United Kingdom	For private owner.
15 April	Port Glasgow	Paddle steamer	John Wood & Co.	Greenock	United Kingdom	For private owner.
26 April	Belleisle	Repulse-class ship of the line	Edward Churchill	Pembroke Dockyard	United Kingdom	For Royal Navy.
April	Jessie	Snow	W. Potts	Sunderland	United Kingdom	For private owner.
3 May	Thétis	Pallas-class frigate		Toulon	France	For French Navy.
10 May	Delight	Cherokee-class brig-sloop		Portsmouth Dockyard	United Kingdom	For Royal Navy.
11 May	Cygnet	Cherokee-class brig-sloop		Portsmouth Dockyard	United Kingdom	For Royal Navy.
12 May	William of Lancaster	Full-rigged ship	Barrick	Whitby	United Kingdom	For private owner.
13 May	Princesa Real	Fifth rate			Portugal	For Portuguese Navy.
14 May	Vulcan	Barge	Thomas Wilson	Faskine	United Kingdom	For Forth and Clyde Canal Company. First iron vessel built in United Kingdom.
25 May	Lord Stewart	Brig	John Hutchinson	Sunderland	United Kingdom	For John Hutchinson.
26 May	Blanche	Leda-class frigate		Chatham Dockyard	United Kingdom	For Royal Navy.
May	Rhoda	Merchantman	John M. & William Gales	Sunderland	United Kingdom	For Turner Thompson.
1 June	Kolym	Cutter	B. F. Stoke	Saint Petersburg	Russia	For Imperial Russian Navy.
4 June	True Blue	Sailboat	King	Low Wood	United Kingdom	For Mr. King.
5 June	Cristina	Frigate		Genoa	Kingdom of Sardinia	For Royal Sardinian Navy.
11 June	Robert	Brigantine	William Simons & Co.	Greenock	United Kingdom	For G. & R. Denniston & Co.
12 June	Catherine	Merchantman	J. Scott & Sons	Greenock	United Kingdom	For Messrs Stirling, Gordon & Co.
19 June	Lord Archibald Hamilton	Brig	Nicol, Reid & Co.	Aberdeen	United Kingdom	For private owber.
19 June	Traveller	Brig	Adamson	Aberdeen	United Kingdom	For private owber.
June	Alabama	Alabama-class schooner	Christian Bergh	New York	United States	For United States Revenue Marine
1 July	Avtroil	Amfitrada-class frigate		Saint Petersburg	United Kingdom	For Imperial Russian Navy.
3 July	Eclipse	Cherokee-class brig-sloop		Plymouth Dockyard	United Kingdom	For Royal Navy.
7 July	Clydesdale	East Indiaman	R. & A. Carsewell	Greenock	United Kingdom	For Denniston Buchanan & Co.
8 July	Fisgard	Leda-class frigate		Pembroke Dockyard	United Kingdom	For Royal Navy.
10 July	Novaia Zemla	Sloop-of-war	A. M. Kurochkin	Arkhangelsk	Russia	For Imperial Russian Navy.
31 July	Patrikii	Spechnyi-class frigate	A. M. Kurochkin	Arkangelsk	Russia	For Imperial Russian Navy.
1 July	Trekh Sviatitelei	Selafail-class ship of the line	A. M. Kurochkin	Arkhangelsk	Russia	For Imperial Russian Navy.
July	Indian Trader	East Indiaman	J. Thomas	Calcutta	India	For private owner.
6 August	Larch	Experimental vessel		Perth	United Kingdom	For the Duke of Atholl.
7 August	Pomona	Merchantman	R. Steele & Co.	Greenock	United Kingdom	For Messrs. Leitch & Smith.
7 August	Woodlark	Merchantman	James Warwick	Rotherhithe	United Kingdom	For Mr. Middleton.
25 August	Souverain	Océan-class ship of the line	Louis Charles Antoine Barallier	Toulon	France	For French Navy
31 August	Akhilles	Sloop	A. V. Zenkhov	Sveaborg	Russia	For Imperial Russian Navy.
August	Fenwick	Snow	James Johnson	Sunderland	United Kingdom	For Mr. Johnson.
5 September	Seringapatam	Seringapatam-class frigate	Bombay Dockyard	Bombay	India	For Royal Navy
5 September	Tvyordyi	Leiptzig-class ship of the line	I. V. Kurepanov	Saint Petersburg	Russia	For Imperial Russian Navy.
7 September	Clydesdale	Merchantman	R. & A. Carsewell	Greenock	United Kingdom	For Messrs. Denniston, Buchanan & Co.
15 September	Sarah	Merchantman	James Warwick	Rotherhithe	United Kingdom	For T. Weeding & Co.
19 September	Princess Charlotte	Brig	Fortesco de Santos	Newcastle	(United Kingdom of Great Britain and Ireland) New South Wales	For Government of New South Wales
28 September	Perseverance	East Indiaman		Whitehaven	United Kingdom	For private owner.
29 September	Thames	Indiaman	George Hilhouse, Sons & Co.	Hotwells	United Kingdom	For private owner.
5 October	Dunvegan Castle	Merchantman	James Macrae	Chittagong	India	For Finlay & Co.
5 October	Isis	Modified Salisbury-class frigate		Woolwich Dockyard	United Kingdom	For Royal Navy.
5 October	Chichley Plowden	Merchantman	Kyd & Co.	Kidderpore	India	For private owner.
16 October	Legkii	Fifth rate	B. F. Stoke	Saint Petersburg	Russia	For Imperial Russian Navy.
19 October	The Paget	Schooner	Jabez Bayley	Ipswich	United Kingdom	For private owner.
21 October	Jane Fairlie	Full-rigged ship	J. Scott & Sons.	Greenock	United Kingdom	For Messrs. Muir & Fairlie.
22 October	Woodford	East Indiaman	G. Hillhouse, Sons & Co.	Bristol	United Kingdom	For Aaron Chapman, or Abel and Arthur Chapman.
20 November	Trelawney	West Indiaman	Scott & Co.	Greenock	United Kingdom	For private owner.
16 December	Emulous	Cherokee-class brig-sloop		Plymouth Dockyard	United Kingdom	For Royal Navy.
Unknown date	Adrian	Merchantman	William Smith & Co.	Newcastle upon Tyne	United Kingdom	For private owner.
Unknown date	Anglia	Merchantman	John M. & William Gales	Sunderland	United Kingdom	For Robert Ord.
Unknown date	Anne	Merchantman	Philip Laine	Sunderland	United Kingdom	For Mr. Stephenson.
Unknown date	Apollo	West Indiaman	Hilhouse	Bristol	United Kingdom	For private owner.
Unknown date	Aurora	Snow		Monkwearmouth	United Kingdom	For Mr. Smith.
Unknown date	Carl XIII	Man of war			Sweden	For Royal Swedish Navy.
Unknown date	East Indian	Merchantman	Bolton & Co.	Hull	United Kingdom	For Mr Boltons.
Unknown date	Fatih i Bahri	Third rate		Constantinople	Ottoman Empire	For Ottoman Navy.
Unknown date	Golden Grove	Merchantman		Sunderland	United Kingdom	For private owner.
Unknown date	Henry	Merchantman	George Taylor	Quebec	(United Kingdom of Great Britain and Ireland) Upper Canada	For private owner.
Unknown date	Heroine	Full-rigged ship	John M. & William Gales	Sunderland	United Kingdom	For J. & R. Greenwell.
Unknown date	Hersilia	Brig	Christopher Leeds	Mystic, Connecticut	United States	For William A. Fanning, James P. Sheffield and Ephraim Williams.
Unknown date	Hindostan	Merchantman	Holt and Richardson	Whitby	United Kingdom	For Christian Richardson & Co.
Unknown date	Jane	Brig		Bombay	India	For Bombay Pilot Service.
Unknown date	Jannet	Brig		Monkwearmouth	United Kingdom	For Mr. Hardies.
Unknown date	Johanna Anna	Full-rigged ship			Netherlands	For Royal Netherlands Navy.
Unknown date	Kuh i Revan	Second rate		Constantinople	Ottoman Empire	For Ottoman Navy.
Unknown date	Laburnum	Brig	Holt	Whitby	United Kingdom	For Mr. Holt.
Unknown date	Ladoga	Sloop-of-war	Mikhail Lazarev	Lodeynoye Pole	Russia	For Imperial Russian Navy.
Unknown date	Lord Teignmouth	Snow	Oswald Partis	Sunderland	United Kingdom	For J. White.
Unknown date	Louisiana	Alabama-class schooner	Christian Bergh	New York	United States	For United States Revenue Marine
Unknown date	Meteor	Full-rigged ship		Newburyport, Massachusetts	United States	For private owner.
Unknown date	Nassau	Snow	Pirie & Co.	Gosport	United Kingdom	For private owner.
Unknown date	Nereus	Merchantman	Philip Laing	Sunderland	United Kingdom	For Philip Laing.
Unknown date	Opyt	Schooner	B. F. Stoke	Saint Petersburg	Russia	For Imperial Russian Navy.
Unknown date	Perennial	Brigantine		River Wear	United Kingdom	For Dent Ditchburn.
Unknown date	Pleiades	Brig	Holt	Whitby	United Kingdom	For Mr. Holt.
Unknown date	Recovery	Merchantman		Ayre	(United Kingdom of Great Britain and Ireland) Isle of Man	For J. Hamlin.
Unknown date	Rosella	Merchantman	William Smith & Co.	Newcastle upon Tyne	United Kingdom	For private owner.
Unknown date	Roslin Castle	Barque		Bristol	United Kingdom	For private owner.
Unknown date	Royal Charlotte	Merchantman			India	For private owner.
Unknown date	Shah Allaum	Frigate		Bombay	India	For an Imaum.
Unknown date	Sirene	Full-rigged ship			Netherlands	For Royal Netherlands Navy.
Unknown date	Sun	Snow	Oswald Partis	Sunderland	United Kingdom	For J. Hay.
Unknown date	Surayya	Fifth rate		Alexandria	(Ottoman Empire) Egypt	For Egyptian Navy.
Unknown date	Marquess of Salisbury	Packet ship	Richard Symons	Little Falmouth	United Kingdom	For Mr. Sutton.
Unknown date	Tour	Snow	John M. & William Gales	Sunderland	United Kingdom	For John M. & William Gales.
Unknown date	Tranmere	Merchantman		Tranmere	United Kingdom	For Mr. Tayleur.
Unknown date	Union	Schooner	William Bayley	Ipswich	United Kingdom	For private owner.
Unknown date	Zeepaard	Sixth rate		Dunkirk	France	For Royal Netherlands Navy.
