= Rosella (ship) =

Several ships have been named Rosella:

- Rosella (1819 ship) was launched at Newcastle upon Tyne. She made one voyage to Sincapore and possibly one to Bengal, both under a licence from the British East India Company (EIC). She sailed widely until she was wrecked in 1860.
- Rosella (1825 ship) was launched in Newcastle upon Tyne and was wrecked on 7 December 1825.
- Rosella (1859 ship), of 283 tons (bm), was launched at Sunderland with J.Atkinson, master, W.Atkinson, owner, and trade Clyde–Calcutta.

== See also ==
- Roselle (ship)
