= List of shipwrecks in August 1860 =

The list of shipwrecks in August 1860 includes ships sunk, foundered, grounded, or otherwise lost during August 1860.

== 1 August ==
List of shipwrecks: 1 August 1860
Ship	State	Description
Ann Taylor	United Kingdom	The brig was driven ashore on Amager, Denmark. She was refloated the next day and resumed her voyage fon 4 August.
Challenge	United Kingdom	The barque was wrecked in the River Plate. She was on a voyage from Buenos Aires, Argentina to a port in Uruguay.
Chase	United Kingdom	The steamship was wrecked in Pond's Bay, Greenland. Her 55 crew were rescued by Narwhal (United Kingdom).
Edwin Forrest	United States	The medium clipper departed from New York for Hong Kong. No further trace, presumed foundered with the loss of all hands.
Inkermann	United Kingdom	The full-rigged ship foundered in the Bay of Biscay (43°00′N 11°10′W). Her 25 crew were rescued by the barque Baticola (Norway). Inkermann was on a voyage from the Clyde to Bombay, India.
William and Ann	United Kingdom	The ship sprang a leak and ran aground at Newton, Northumberland.

== 2 August ==
List of shipwrecks: 2 August 1860
Ship	State	Description
Eliza	(United Kingdom of Great Britain and Ireland) British North America	The schooner was driven ashore on the south coast of Prince Edward Island. She was on a voyage from Pictou, Nova Scotia to Quebec City, Province of Canada.

== 3 August ==
List of shipwrecks: 3 August 1860
Ship	State	Description
Mariner	United Kingdom	The barque was driven ashore in Table Bay. Her eighteen crew survived, but her captain committed suicide. She was on a voyage from Cape Town, Cape Colony to Saint Helena.
Millbrook	United Kingdom	The ship ran aground at Hakodate, Japan. She was on a voyage from Shanghai, China to Hakodate.
Veracity	United Kingdom	The ship was driven ashore at Lowestoft, Suffolk. She was refloated and resumed her voyage.

== 4 August ==
List of shipwrecks: 4 August 1860
Ship	State	Description
Æolus	United Kingdom	The schooner was driven ashore near Aux Cayes, Haiti. All nine people on board survived. She was on a voyage from Aux Cayes to Falmouth, Cornwall.

== 5 August ==
List of shipwrecks: 5 August 1860
Ship	State	Description
Adelphi	United Kingdom	The ship ran aground at North Shields, County Durham. She was refloated.
Annot Lyle	United Kingdom	The brigantine was wrecked on Swan Island. Her eight crew survived.
Glenbervie	United Kingdom	The barque was destroyed by fire in the Falkland Islands. Her seventeen crew survived. She was on a voyage from the Clyde to Valparaíso, Chile.
Nicolai	(Russian Empire) Grand Duchy of Finland	The schooner foundered in the Dogger Bank with the loss of a crew member. Survivors were rescued by the fishing boat Julie (Belgium). Nicolai was on a voyage from Newcastle upon Tyne, Northumberland, United Kingdom to Stockholm, Sweden.
Osten Stjernen	Norway	The schooner was driven ashore and wrecked at Thisted. She was on a voyage from Middlesbrough, Yorkshire, United Kingdom to Porsgrund.
Spring Flower	United Kingdom	The paddle tug collided with the brig Radical (United Kingdom) and sank in the Swin, 1 nautical mile (1.9 km) north of the Swin Middle Lightship ( Trinity House). Her crew survived.
Wave of Life	United Kingdom	The barque was driven ashore on Mayotte. Her fourteen crew survived. She was on a voyage from South Shields, County Durham to Aden.

== 6 August ==
List of shipwrecks: 6 August 1860
Ship	State	Description
Amphitrite	United Kingdom	The ship was driven ashore at Tynemouth, Northumberland. she was refloated.
Eugenie	United Kingdom	The ship ran aground at North Shields, County Durham. She was refloated but was beached on the Insand.
Glenbervie	United Kingdom	The ship was destroyed by fire off the Falkland Islands. Her crew were rescued by Tigre (United Kingdom). Glenbervie was on a voyage from Glasgow, Renfrewshire to Valparaíso, Chile.
James Watt	United Kingdom	The tug was severely damaged by a boiler explosion at Hull, Yorkshire.
Lord Gough	United Kingdom	The ship ran aground at Dieppe, Seine-Inférieure, France. She was on a voyage from the River Tyne to Dieppe. She was refloated on 17 August and taken in to Dieppe.
Valerie	France	The brig was abandoned in the Atlantic Ocean. Her crew were rescued by Pacific (United Kingdom).
Vintage	United Kingdom	The ship ran aground at North Shields. She was refloated.

== 7 August ==
List of shipwrecks: 7 August 1860
Ship	State	Description
Gazelle	United Kingdom	The schooner was driven ashore and wrecked on Sambro Island, Nova Scotia, British North America. Her eight crew survived. She was on a voyage from New York, United States to a port in Newfoundland.
Isaac Bell	United States	The full-rigged ship was wrecked in the Yangtze-kiang. Her crew were rescued. She was on a voyage from Cardiff, Glamorgan, United Kingdom to Shanghai, China.
Providence	United Kingdom	The ship was driven ashore in St Bride's Bay.
Sunbeam	United Kingdom	The brig ran aground and was wrecked on the Filsand, in the Baltic Sea. Her eight crew were rescued. She was on a voyage from Newcastle upon Tyne, Northumberland to Kronstadt, Russia.

== 8 August ==
List of shipwrecks: 8 August 1860
Ship	State	Description
Edmund Kaye	United Kingdom	The ship was damaged by fire at Mauritius. She was on a voyage from Bombay, India to Liverpool, Lancashire.
Fairy	United Kingdom	The schooner collided with the brig Arun (United Kingdom) and was abandoned off the Kent coast. Her crew were rescued by Arun. Fairy was on a voyage from Warkworth, Northumberland to Caen, Calvados, France. She was towed in to Dover, Kent by the tug Perseverance (United Kingdom).
Hilderthorpe	United Kingdom	The brigantine was wrecked at Brielle, South Holland, Netherlands. Her six crew were rescued by the fishing smack Nieuwsluis Welvaren (Netherlands). Hilderthorpe was on a voyage from Middlesbrough, Yorkshire to Rotterdam, South Holland.
Jane	United Kingdom	The sloop foundered in the Irish Sea. She was on a voyage from Whitehaven, Cumberland to Liverpool.

== 9 August ==
List of shipwrecks: 9 August 1860
Ship	State	Description
Canada	United Kingdom	The steamship ran aground at Halifax, Nova Scotia, British North America. She was on a voyage from Halifax to Liverpool, Lancashire. She was refloated on 12 August and resumed her voyage.
Emma Tully	United Kingdom	The barque was wrecked on the Hat Key Reef. Her thirteen crew survived. She was on a voyage from Rio de Janeiro, Brazil to Belize City, British Honduras.
Northumberland	United Kingdom	The steamship ran aground on the Newcombe Sand, in the North Sea off the coast of Suffolk. She was on a voyage from South Shields, County Durham to London. Northumberland was refloated the next day and resumed her voyage.

== 10 August ==
List of shipwrecks: 10 August 1860
Ship	State	Description
Falcon	(United Kingdom of Great Britain and Ireland) Guernsey	The schooner was run down and sunk by a full-rigged ship off Holyhead, Anglesey. Her crew were rescued. She was on a voyage from Huelva, Spain to Liverpool, Lancashire.
Sealark	United Kingdom	The ship was driven ashore at Ilfracombe, Devon. She was on a voyage from Newport, Monmouthshire to Saint Thomas, Virgin Islands. She had been refloated with the assistance of a steamship by 17 August and taken in to Ilfracombe.

== 11 August ==
List of shipwrecks: 11 August 1860
Ship	State	Description
Courier	United Kingdom	The ship was abandoned 40 nautical miles (74 km) south west of The Triangles. She was on a voyage from Havre de Grâce, Seine-Inférieure, France to Veracruz, Mexico.
Elizabeth Bibby	United Kingdom	The ship was driven ashore and wrecked on "Imp Island". She was on a voyage from Mobile, Alabama, United States to Liverpool, Lancashire.
Ellen	United Kingdom	The schooner ran aground on the Haisborough Sands, in the North Sea off the coast of Norfolk. She was on a voyage from Zieirkzee, Zeeland, Netherlands to Great Yarmouth, Norfolk. She was refloated and taken in to Great Yarmouth.
J. F. Hoyle	Grand Duchy of Oldenburg	The brig was driven ashore and wrecked on Bird Island, Bermuda. She was on a voyage from Newcastle upon Tyne, Northumberland, United Kingdom to Saint Thomas, Virgin Islands.

== 12 August ==
List of shipwrecks: 12 August 1860
Ship	State	Description
Active	(United Kingdom of Great Britain and Ireland) British North America	The schooner collided with HMS Styx (Royal Navy) and was severely damaged. Her crew were taken off by HMS Styx and she was towed in to Pubnico, Nova Scotia.
Gillan, or Zillah	United Kingdom	The barque ran aground on the Corton Sand, in the North Sea off the coast of Suffolk. She was refloated and taken in to Lowestoft, Suffolk.
HMS Hero	Royal Navy	The second rate ran aground at Gaspé, Province of Canada, British North America. She was refloated.
Iron Duke	United Kingdom	The paddle steamer was damaged by fire at Liverpool, Lancashire.
Lord Clyde	United Kingdom	The full-rigged ship was destroyed by fire 50 nautical miles (93 km) off Cape Recife, Cape Colony. Her crew survived. She was on a voyage from Calcutta, India to London.

== 13 August ==
List of shipwrecks: 13 August 1860
Ship	State	Description
Annette	United Kingdom	The brig was driven ashore on Inagua, Bahamas. She was on a voyage from a port in Cuba to Baltimore, Maryland, United States.
Branscombe	United Kingdom	The ship was wrecked on Agincourt, off the coast of Formosa. Her fourteen crew survived. She was on a voyage from Woosung, China to Manila, Spanish East Indies.
Handel	Netherlands	The schooner was driven ashore and wrecked west of Elmina, Gambia Colony and Protectorate. Her crew were rescued.
South Pictou	United Kingdom	The brig was run down and sank with the loss of one of her seven crew. She was on a voyage from Huelva, Spain to Bristol, Gloucestershire.

== 14 August ==
List of shipwrecks: 14 August 1860
Ship	State	Description
Dorothea	United Kingdom	The ship was lost off Stangskar Point, Sweden. Her crew were rescued. She was on a voyage from South Shields, County Durham to Norrköping, Sweden.

== 15 August ==
List of shipwrecks: 15 August 1860
Ship	State	Description
Enterprise	United Kingdom	The ship schooner was driven ashore at Sidmouth, Devon. She was on a voyage from Newcastle upon Tyne, Northumberland to Sidmouth.
Horsburg	United States	The full-rigged ship was abandoned in the Pacific Ocean off the Juan Fernández Islands, Chile. Her fifteen crew were rescued by Veloz (Chile). Horsburg was on a voyage from Callao, Peru to an American port.
Lady Pirie	United Kingdom	The ship was driven ashore on Saaremaa, Russia. She was refloated.
Perimede	United Kingdom	The brig was beached at Saint Helena, where she was wrecked. Her ten crew survived. She was on a voyage from Newcastle upon Tyne to Madras, India.

== 16 August ==
List of shipwrecks: 16 August 1860
Ship	State	Description
Aleste	France	The brig ran aground on the Insand, in the North Sea off the coast of County Durham, United Kingdom. She was refloated.
Arcadian	(United Kingdom of Great Britain and Ireland) New Zealand	The schooner was wrecked after running aground at Napier, New Zealand. She was leaving port during a heavy swell.
Calliope	Imperial Brazilian Navy	The brig of war sprang a leak and foundered in the Atlantic Ocean 35 nautical miles (65 km) off Maranhão with the loss of sixteen of her crew.
Colonsay	United Kingdom	The full-rigged ship was wrecked on a reef two miles off Speedwell Island in the Falkland Islands during a voyage from the Chincha Islands and Callao, Peru, to an English port with a cargo of guano. The crew of about 22 were marooned ashore for 11 days before being rescued by a sealer and taken to Stanley on East Falkland.
Crimea	United Kingdom	The barque was driven ashore on Zea, Greece. Her fourteen crew survived. She was on a voyage from Malta to Odesa.
George Henderson	(United Kingdom of Great Britain and Ireland) New Zealand	The brig ran aground at the mouth of the Te Hēnui Stream, New Plymouth, New Zealand during a heavy westerly gale. All crew were saved.
Margaret	United Kingdom	The ship collided with Lisbon (United Kingdom) and sank at the mouth of the Elbe. Her seven crew were rescued. She was on a voyage from Hartlepool, County Durham to Hamburg.
Sarah	United Kingdom	The brig ran aground at the mouth of the Thanlwin. She was on a voyage from Rangoon, Burma to Liverpool, Lancashire. She was refloated and put back to Rangoon in a severely leaky condition.

== 17 August ==
List of shipwrecks: 17 August 1860
Ship	State	Description
Ariel	United Kingdom	The ship ran aground in the River Tees. She was on a voyage from Quebec City, Province of Canada, British North America to Stockton-on-Tees, County Durham. She was refloated the next day and taken in to Stockton-on-Tees.
Defiance	(United Kingdom of Great Britain and Ireland) British North America	The brig ran aground 5 nautical miles (9.3 km) south of Campbeltown, Argyllshire. She was on a voyage from Troon, Ayrshire to Yarmouth, Nova Scotia. She was refloated and takenin to Campbeltown.
Florida	United Kingdom	The ship struck a rock off "Cape Takii" and was abandoned. She was on a voyage from Taganrog, Russia to a British port.
Jacksons	United Kingdom	The ship ran aground on the Herd Sand, in the North Sea off the coast of County Durham. She was on a voyage from Rotterdam, South Holland, Netherlands to North Shields, County Durham. She was refloated the next day and taken in to North Shields.

== 18 August ==
List of shipwrecks: 18 August 1860
Ship	State	Description
Ann and John	United Kingdom	The ship struck the Itakivi Rock, off Seskar, Russia and was damaged. She was on a voyage from Kronstadt to Riga. She put in to the Drangsound in a leaky condition.
Faina	United Kingdom	The ship ran aground on the Lemon Sand, in the North Sea. She was refloated and assisted in the Great Yarmouth, Norfolk in a leaky condition.
Plastun (Пластун)	Imperial Russian Navy	The Razboynik-class clipper exploded and sank east of Gotland in the Baltic Sea, at approx. 57°45′N 20°5′E, with the loss of 75 of her 109 crew.

== 19 August ==
List of shipwrecks: 19 August 1860
Ship	State	Description
Aurora	United Kingdom	The brig went ashore, in fog, on the Brow-of-Ponds in the Western Rocks, Isles of Scilly, while carrying wheat from Brăila, United Principalities, to Falmouth, Cornwall, England. Her crew survived but the cargo was lost and the wreck was sold on 23 August.
Barbara	United Kingdom	The schooner was driven ashore at Wells-next-the-Sea, Norfolk. Her crew survived.
Duna	United Kingdom	The brig was driven ashore at Nakkehead, Denmark. Her nine crew survived. She was on a voyage from Newcastle upon Tyne, Northumberland to Kronstadt, Russia. She had become a wreck by 23 August.
Herny Reid	United Kingdom	The tug sank near Constanţa, Ottoman Empire. Her crew were rescued.
St. Vincent	United Kingdom	The ship was driven ashore at "Stamarca", Brazil. She was on a voyage from Pernambuco to Paraíba. She was refloated.

== 20 August ==
List of shipwrecks: 20 August 1860
Ship	State	Description
Queen	United Kingdom	The schooner was abandoned off Uist, Outer Hebrides. Her six crew survived. She was on a voyage from Hamburg to Newcastle upon Tyne, Northumberland.
Rover	United Kingdom	The brig ran aground on the Sizewell Bank, in the North Sea off the coast of Suffolk. She was on a voyage from Sunderland, County Durham to Bordeaux, Gironde, France. She was later refloated and resumed her voyage.
Siamese Crown	United Kingdom	The full-rigged ship was driven ashore and wrecked at Sanghan, Spanish East Indies. Her crew survived, but some of them were murdered by pirates. She was on a voyage from Hong Kong to Wei Hai Wei, China.

== 21 August ==
List of shipwrecks: 21 August 1860
Ship	State	Description
Brotherly Love	United Kingdom	The brig ran aground on the Sizewell Bank, in the North Sea off the coast of Suffolk. She was on a voyage from Newcastle upon Tyne, Northumberland to London. She was refloated and resumed her voyage.
Dee	United Kingdom	The sloop was scuttled at Staxigo, Caithness. Her three crew survived.
Dredger	United Kingdom	The steamship struck a rock in the River Ribble and sank. She was on a voyage from Preston, Lancashire to Cartagena, Spain.
Johns	United Kingdom	The ship ran aground on the Brake Sand and was damaged. She was refloated and taken in to Ramsgate, Kent in a leaky condition.
Obi	United Kingdom	The schooner ran aground on the Goodwin Sands, Kent. She was on a voyage from Truro, Cornwall to the River Tyne. She was refloated and taken in to The Downs.
Pursuit	United Kingdom	The schooner ran aground on the Gunfleet Sand, in the North Sea off the coast of Essex and was holed by her anchor. She was on a voyage from South Shields, County Durham to London. She was refloated and taken in to Harwich, Essex where she was beached. She was taken in to Harwich the next day in a waterlogged condition.

== 22 August ==
List of shipwrecks: 22 August 1860
Ship	State	Description
Charlotte	United Kingdom	The brig was driven ashore at Bremerhaven. She was on a voyage from Newcastle upon Tyne, Northumberland to Bremen.
Eugene	United Kingdom	The ship was wrecked at Westport, Nova Scotia, British North America. She was on a voyage from Saint John, New Brunswick, British North America to Cork.
Nettuno	Kingdom of Sardinia	The brig was driven ashore on the coast of Cornwall, United Kingdom and was abandoned by all but one of her crew. She was refloated and towed in to Falmouth, Cornwall.
Souvenir	(United Kingdom of Great Britain and Ireland) Jersey	The schooner collided with the Newarp Lightship ( Trinity House). Three of her eight crew got aboard the lightship. Sovenir was presumed to have foundered. She was on a voyage from Newcastle upon Tyne, Northumberland to Palermo, Sicily.
Violante	Brazil	The ship was destroyed by fire at Paraíba.
William and Thomas	United Kingdom	The ship collided with the Thames barge Louisa (United Kingdom) and sank in the River Medway at Upnor, Kent. She was on a voyage from Rochester, Kent to Sunderland, County Durham.

== 23 August ==
List of shipwrecks: 23 August 1860
Ship	State	Description
Eliza	United Kingdom	The full-rigged ship foundered off Cape Horn, Chile. Her crew were rescued. She was on a voyage from Valparaíso, Chile to New York, United States.
Union	United Kingdom	The schooner was abandoned in the North Sea 9 nautical miles (17 km) north west of Cromer, Norfolk. Her crew were rescued by the brig Maria Hardy (United Kingdom) before she sank. Union was on a voyage from London to Sunderland, County Durham.

== 24 August ==
List of shipwrecks: 24 August 1860
Ship	State	Description
Kelvin	United Kingdom	The full-rigged ship was driven ashore at Point Riche, Newfoundland, British North America. She was on a voyage from Miramichi, New Brunswick, British North America to Liverpool, Lancashire. She had become a wreck by 18 October.
Isabella Scott	United Kingdom	The ship ran aground at Pará, Brazil. She was on a voyage from Liverpool to Pará. She was refloated and taken in to Pará.
Rosella	United Kingdom	The barque sank off Egmond aan Zee, North Holland, Netherlands. She was on a voyage from South Shields, County Durham to Rotterdam, South Holland, Netherlands.
HMS Wasp	Royal Navy	The Archer-class sloop ran aground at Cape Point, Cape Colony. Subsequently refloated, repaired and returned to service.

== 25 August ==
List of shipwrecks: 25 August 1860
Ship	State	Description
Christian and Margaret	United Kingdom	The ship foundered in the North Sea off Texel, North Holland, Netherlands. Her crew were rescued by the fishing smack Vlaarding's Hoop (Netherlands).
Christian and Mary	United Kingdom	The ship was wrecked at Auckland, New Zealand.

== 26 August ==
List of shipwrecks: 26 August 1860
Ship	State	Description
Britannia	United Kingdom	The sloop sank in the Irish Sea off Southport, Lancashire. Both crew were rescued. She was on a voyage from Bangor, Caernarfonshire to Preston, Lancashire.
Hope	United Kingdom	The smack was wrecked on the Horse Bank, in the Irish Sea off the coast of Lancashire. Her three crew were rescued by the Lytham Lifeboat.
Roscius	United Kingdom	The full-rigged ship was wrecked off George's Banks, in the Atlantic Ocean. Her 26 crew were rescued by the full-rigged ship Zurich (United Kingdom). She was on a voyage from Liverpool, Lancashire to New York, United States.
Thorndale	United Kingdom	The ship was wrecked on Bornholm, Denmark.

== 27 August ==
List of shipwrecks: 27 August 1860
Ship	State	Description
Dove	United Kingdom	The schooner sprang a leak and sank in the North Sea 8 nautical miles (15 km) east south east of the Happisburgh Lighthouse, Norfolk. Her four crew survived. She was on a voyage from South Shields, County Durham to Schiedam, South Holland, Netherlands.
Kitty	United Kingdom	The barque was lost in Hudson's Bay with the loss of all fifteen of her crew. She was on a voyage from London to Hudson's Bay.
Midge	United Kingdom	The steamship foundered in the South Atlantic. Her crew were rescued by Velocidade (Brazil). Midge was on a voyage from Liverpool, Lancashire to Bombay, India.
Thorndale	United Kingdom	The snow was wrecked on Bornholm, Denmark. Heer eight crew survived. She was on a voyage from Hartlepool, County Durham to Kronstadt, Russia.

== 28 August ==
List of shipwrecks: 28 August 1860
Ship	State	Description
HMS Emerald	Royal Navy	The Emerald-class frigate ran aground off Alderney, Channel Islands. She was refloated the next day and taken in to Portsmouth, Hampshire for repairs.
Provestenen	Norway	The brig was discovered derelict off Umeå, Sweden by the steamship Berzelius (Sweden). She was towed in to the mouth of the Ume River.

== 29 August ==
List of shipwrecks: 29 August 1860
Ship	State	Description
Amity	United Kingdom	The brig ran aground on the Sizewell Bank, in the North Sea off the coast of Suffolk. She was refloated and assisted in to Lowestoft, Suffolk in a leaky condition.
Emily	United Kingdom	The schooner ran aground on the Holm Sand, in the North Sea off the coast of Suffolk and sank. Her four crew survived. She was on a voyage from Bo'ness, Moray to Calais, France.
Inkerman	France	The brig caught fire at Havre de Grâce, Seine-Inférieure and was scuttled.
Sportsman	United Kingdom	The ship ran aground on the Perch Sand, in the Irish Sea off Lytham St. Annes, Lancashire. She was on a voyage from Glasgow, Renfrewshire to Preston, Lancashire.
Vigilante	Denmark	The schooner was driven ashore at Cádiz, Spain. She was on a voyage from the River Tyne to Barcelona, Spain. She was refloated and taken in to Cádiz in a leaky condition.
William and Charles	United Kingdom	The steamboat ran aground and sank at Whitby, Yorkshire. All on board survived. She was refloated the next day.

== 30 August ==
List of shipwrecks: 30 August 1860
Ship	State	Description
Alfred	France	The brig was driven ashore at Buenos Aires, Argentina.
Alma	Lübeck	The barque was driven ashore at Buenos Aires.
Annette	Denmark	The barque was driven ashore at Buenos Aires.
Beethoven	United Kingdom	The barque was driven ashore at Buenos Aires. She was on a voyage from London to Buenos Aires. She was consequently condemned.
Bertha Schuinga	Netherlands	The brigantine was driven ashore at Buenos Aires.
Caldee	United Kingdom	The ship was driven ashore at Buenos Aires.
Concordia	Denmark	The brigantine was driven ashore and wrecked between San Isidro and San Fernando de la Buena Vista, Argentina. She was on a voyage from Gualeguaychú, Argentina to London.
Crusader, and Reciprocity	United Kingdom	The barques collided at Buenos Aires. Both vessels foundered. Their crews were rescued by the barque Nil (France and HMS Oberon (Royal Navy).
Dawn	United States	The barque was damaged at Buenos Aires.
Ernest George	Kingdom of Hanover	The brigantine was driven ashore at Buenos Aires.
Gabriel	France	The schooner sank 12 nautical miles (22 km) south of the Longships Lighthouse, Cornwall, United Kingdom. All on board were rescued. She was on a voyage from Saint-Nazaire, Ille-et-Vilaine to Cardiff, Glamorgan, United Kingdom.
Harmonie	Danzig	The ship departed from Danzig for London. No further trace, presumed foundered with the loss of all hands.
Jane Hudson	United Kingdom	The brig was driven ashore and wrecked at Buenos Aires, Argentina. Her nine crew survived. She was on a voyage from Liverpool, Lancashire to Buenos Aires.
Margaret and Jane	United Kingdom	The barque was driven ashore at Buenos Aires. She had been refloated by 26 October.
Picciola	Hamburg	The brigantine was driven ashore at Buenos Aires.
San Antonio	Kingdom of Sardinia	The polacca was driven ashore at Buenos Aires.
Senegal	France	The barque was driven ashore at Buenos Aires.
29 Septembre	Argentina	The brig was driven ashore at Buenos Aires.

== 31 August ==
List of shipwrecks: 31 August 1860
Ship	State	Description
Alexander and William	United Kingdom	The sloop sprang a leak and was beached at Redcar, Yorkshire, where she was wrecked. She was reported to be on a voyage from Rosedale, Yorkshire to Newcastle upon Tyne, Northumberland.
London	United Kingdom	The barque was wrecked on Saaremaa, Russia. Her nine crew were rescued. She was on a voyage from Liverpool, Lancashire to Kronstadt, Russia.
Pallas	United Kingdom	The ship ran aground on The Shingles, off the Isle of Wight. She was on a voyage from South Shields, County Durham to Brixham, Devon. She was refloated on 2 September and resumed her voyage.

== Unknown date ==
List of shipwrecks: Unknown date in August 1860
Ship	State	Description
Aurora	United Kingdom	The ship was wrecked in the Hooghly River before 23 August.
Borderer	United Kingdom	The ship was abandoned at sea. Her crew were rescued.
Cincinattus	United Kingdom	The ship was destroyed by fire off the coast of Brazil. Her crew survived. She was on a voyage from Sunderland, County Durham to Calcutta, India.
Emma	(United Kingdom of Great Britain and Ireland) New Zealand	The brig was wrecked when she ran aground on the Manukau bar.
Evelyn	United Kingdom	The full-rigged ship foundered in the Atlantic Ocean (34°19′N 69°54′W) before 4 August with the loss of three of her crew. Survivors were rescued by Lady McNaughten (United Kingdom). Evelyn was on a voyage from Liverpool, Lancashire to Calcutta.
Floke	Norway	The ship foundered off Fugloy, Denmark. She was on a voyage from Swansea, Glamorgan, United Kingdom to "Alten".
Furst Suwarrow	Russia	The steamship ran aground and sank near "Salis" with the loss of one life. She was on a voyage from Riga to Pärnu.
Gleaner	United States	The barque was destroyed by fire before 19 August. Her crew were rescued by Harrington (United Kingdom). Gleaner was on a voyage from New Orleans, Louisiana to San Blas.
Glen Isle	United Kingdom	The ship was driven ashore. She was on a voyage from London to Calcutta. She was refloated and completed her voyage, arriving at Calcutta on 30 August in a severely hogged condition.
Helen	United Kingdom	The sloop was abandoned in Liverpool Bay in late August.
Helene	Hamburg	The barque was wrecked at Saigon, French Cochinchina before 10 August.
Henry Wright	United Kingdom	The ship was wrecked in the Danube 40 nautical miles (74 km) downstream of Sulina, Ottoman Empire. Her crew were rescued.
Jeune Firmin	France	The ship was wrecked near the Île d'Oléron, Charente-Inférieure with the loss of all but one of her crew. She was on a voyage from Libourne, Gironde to Rochefort, Charente-Inférieure.
John Benson	United Kingdom	The brig was wrecked at Whitehead before 23 August.
J. P. Whelan	United Kingdom	The ship was driven ashore in the Mississippi River 60 nautical miles (110 km) downstream of New Orleans, Louisiana, United States. She was on a voyage from New Orleans to Liverpool.
Napi	(United Kingdom of Great Britain and Ireland) New Zealand	The cutter was wrecked at the mouth of the Taieri River, New Zealand. All hands were saved.
Reine Blanche	France	The ship was driven ashore in the Banka Fulla Channel. She was on a voyage from Cardiff, Glamorgan, United Kingdom to Calcutta. She was later refloated and completed her voyage, arriving at Calcutta on 29 August.
Rosetta	United Kingdom	The ship ran aground in the River Tees. She was on a voyage from Middlesbrough, Yorkshire to Southampton, Hampshire. She was refloated and resumed her voyage, but put in to Dover, Kent in a leaky condition on 5 August.
Start	United Kingdom	The Humber Keel sank off Seaham, County Durham before 25 August.
Tasmanian	United Kingdom	The ship was driven ashore in the Strait of Belle Isle. She was on a voyage from Liverpool to Quebec City, Province of Canada, British North America. She was refloated and resumed her voyage, arriving at Quebec City on 24 August. She was placed under repair.
Typhoon	United Kingdom	The ship was abandoned at sea before 20 August. Her crew were rescued. She was on a voyage from Akyab, Burma to Falmouth, Cornwall.
Wilhelmina	Flag unknown	The schooner was driven ashore at South Shields before 22 August. She was refloated and taken in to Berwick upon Tweed, Northumberland for repairs.
Xelyn	United Kingdom	The ship foundered in the Atlantic Ocean (34°19′N 9°54′W. Her crew survived. She was on a voyage from Liverpool to Calcutta.
