= Boyne (1807 ship) =

History

United Kingdom
- Name: Boyne
- Owner: Benjamin Fergusson
- Builder: Matthew Smith, Calcutta
- Launched: 16 November 1807
- Fate: Sold

Denmark-Norway
- Acquired: c.1810 by purchase
- Fate: Sold 1811

United Kingdom
- Name: Moffat
- Owner: EIC voyages #1–3: Andrew Timbrell; EIC voyages #4–7: Thomas Ward
- Acquired: 1811 by purchase
- Fate: Last listed 1856

General characteristics
- Tons burthen: 750, or 75021/94, or 776, or 7766/94, or 790, or 798, or 800, or 820, or 821, or 840 (bm)
- Length: Overall:134 ft 1 in (40.9 m); Keel:105 ft 7 in (32.2 m)
- Beam: 37 ft 2 in (11.3 m)
- Depth of hold: 19 ft 6 in (5.9 m)
- Complement: 80
- Armament: 20 × 12-pounder guns
- Notes: Two decks

Boyne was launched at Calcutta in 1807. In 1809 she sailed to England. She was sold to the Danes, but by 1811 was under English ownership under the name Moffat (or Moffatt). She then made seven voyages as a "regular ship" for the British East India Company (EIC). After the EIC exited its maritime activities in 1833–34, Moffat made four voyages transporting convicts to Australia: one voyage to Port Jackson and three to Van Diemen's Land. She also made at least one voyage carrying immigrants to South Australia, and later regularly traded between Liverpool and Bombay. She was last listed in 1856.

== Boyne ==
Captain John Nicholls (or Nichol) sailed from Calcutta on 17 April 1809, bound for England. Boyne was at Saugor on 14 July and Madras on 21 September. She reached the Cape of Good Hope 25 December and St Helena on 27 January 1810; she arrived at Gravesend on 17 April.

In England Boyne reportedly was sold to the Danes. (Note: This is curious as Denmark-Norway and England were engaged in the Gunboat War.) However, she returned to English ownership c.1811.

== Moffat ==
New owners named her Moffat. (Note: Andrew Timbrell, Moffat's managing partner and Kennard Smith had on 21 August 1808 offered to have a 1200 ton (bm) ship, to be named Moffatt, built at Bombay for the EIC's service. As the EIC does not appear to have taken them up on this offer, Timbrell apparently took up the opportunity presented by the availability of Boyne for purchase.) The EIC took her up as a "regular ship". (Note: Hardy confirms that the regular ship Moffat had been the extra ship Boyne, built in Calcutta. However, he gives the launch year as 1804.)

=== EIC voyages ===
EIC voyage #1 (1811–1812): Moffat first appears in Lloyd's Register for 1811 with B. Barber, master, J. Timbrell, owner, and as having left London on 20 March 1811 with destination India. Captain Benjamin Barber acquired a letter of marque on 3 April 1811.

Captain Barber sailed from Torbay 30 May 1811, bound for Bombay. Moffat reached Madeira on 20 June and arrived at Bombay on 26 October. Homeward bound, she reached St Helena on 14 February 1812 and Portsmouth on 25 April; she arrived at The Downs on 10 May.

Moffat was admitted to the Registry of Great Britain on 16 July 1812.=

EIC voyage #2 (1813–1814): Captain Simon Lee sailed from Portsmouth on 20 April 1813, bound for Madras and Bombay. Moffat reached Madeira on 13 May and arrived at Madras on 6 September. She arrived at Kidderpore on 25 October. Homeward bound, she was at Saugor on 19 December and Madras on 15 February. She reached the Cape on 26 April and St Helena on 19 May. She arrived at The Downs on 6 August.

EIC voyage #3 (1818–1819): Captain Lee sailed from Portsmouth on 2 August 1818, bound for China. She reached Tristan da Cunha on 13 October and arrived at Whampoa anchorage on 13 February 1819. Homeward bound, she crossed the Second Bar on 23 March, reached St Helena on 11 July, and arrived at The Downs on 19 September.

EIC voyage #4 (1824–1825): Captain Robert Railston Brown sailed from the Downs on 7 August 1824, bound for China and Quebec. Moffat spent much of the entire voyage in company with Juliana. Moffat arrived at Whampoa on 23 January 1825, and Juliana arrived two days later. Moffat crossed the Second Bar on 23 February. Juliana and Moffatt left Canton on 24 February 1825.

They kept company for 20 days but then separated off Java. They rejoined at the Cape of Good Hope. Juliana reached St Helena on 16 May, and Moffat did so on 17 May.

They separated again, but arrived at Quebec within hours of other. Moffat arrived on 12 July, and Juliana arrived on 13 July. When they arrived, local newspapers reported that they were the first ships to come to Quebec from China.

Moffat arrived back at London on 30 September.

EIC voyage #5 (1826–1827): Captain Brown sailed from The Downs on 25 June 1826, bound for China. Moffat arrived at Whampoa on 18 November. Homeward bound, she crossed the Second Bar on 10 January 1827, reached St Helena on 18 March, and arrived at Blackwall on 16 May.

EIC voyage #6 (1828–?): Captain Brown sailed from The Downs on 5 July 1828. Moffat arrived at Saugor on 14 November and Burah Bazaar on 24 November. It is not clear when Moffat returned to England.

EIC voyage #7 (1832–1833): Captain James Cromartie sailed from The Downs on 25 June 1832, bound for China and Halifax. Moffat reached Singapore on 6 November. She was in the china Sea and well on her way to Canton when she encountered a typhoon that lasted five days and cost her her main and mizzen masts and her fore-top mast. She ended up driven back towards Singapore and had to put in to fix her damage. Moffat finally arrived at Whampoa on 3 February 1833. She crossed the Second Bar on 26 February and arrived at Halifax on 22 June. She returned to England on 27 September 1833.

=== Convict and immigrant transport ===
Convict voyage #1 (1834): Captain James Cromarty sailed from Plymouth on 29 January 1834 and arrived at Hobart Town on 9 May. Moffat had embarked 400 male convicts and she landed 394.

Convict voyage #2 (1836): Captain James Bolton sailed from Plymouth on 7 May 1836 and arrived at Sydney on 31 August. Moffat embarked 399 male convicts and suffered three convict deaths en route. One prisoner was found to be insane and was relanded before she left. She also carried 18 blacks from the West Indies, two of whom were among the three men who died on the voyage. In October she sailed to Bengal, transferring the last detachment of the 17th Regiment of Foot to Bengal.

Convict voyage #3 (1837–1838): Captain Bolton sailed from Portsmouth on 9 November 1837. Moffat sailed via the Cape and arrived at Hobart on 1 April 1838. She embarked 400 male convicts and suffered three convict deaths en route. After Moffat had delivered he convicts she sailed on to Sydney where she arrived on 26 April. There she disembarked some settlers and soldiers, and 30 prisoners, some of whom would go on to Norfolk Island.

Immigrant voyage (1839): Captain Gilbert sailed from London on 26 August 1839 and arrived at Port Adelaide on 19 December. She brought 316 immigrants.

Immigrant voyage (1841): Then on 27 January 1841 Gilbert again sailed for Australia and arrived in Sydney on 31 May.

Convict voyage #4 (1842): Captain James Gilbert sailed from Portsmouth on 18 August 1842 and arrived at Hobart on 28 November. Moffat had embarked 389 male convicts and suffered two convict deaths en route.

=== Later career ===
In 1846, Moffat was sold to Smith & Co., Plymouth, and in 1850 to J. Pope, Plymouth. Her trade was Liverpool–Bombay.

== Fate ==
Lloyd's Register of 1854 shows no owner or trade. In 1854 Moffat was sold to W.S. Miller & Co., Liverpool, for use as a hulk. Lloyd's Register for 1855 shows her master as T. Chenew, her owner as Miller & Co., and her trade as Liverpool–Bombay. She is last listed in 1856, and with no trade.
