= Juliana (1814 ship) =

History

United Kingdom
- Name: Juliana
- Builder: Matthew Smith, Sulkea, Calcutta
- Launched: 29 January 1814
- Fate: Wrecked 1839
- Notes: The EIC records in the British Library conflate this ship with Juliana

General characteristics
- Class & type: Barque
- Tons burthen: 521, or 549, or 550 (bm)
- Length: 117 ft 6 in (35.8 m)
- Beam: 32 ft 6 in (9.9 m)
- Notes: Teak-built; three masts and two decks

Juliana was launched at Salkia, opposite Calcutta, in 1814. She spent almost all of her career trading between England and India. She made one voyage for the British East India Company (EIC), in 1824–25; she ended this voyage in Quebec, becoming, with her consort, the first vessels to arrive at Quebec from China. She wrecked at Cape Town in 1839 while carrying immigrants from England to Sydney, New South Wales.

== Career ==
Juliana spent her first 10 years in private trade to India as a licensed ship.

EIC voyage (1824–1825): Captain Alexander Fotheringham sailed from London on 12 August, and Portsmouth on 22 August 1824, bound for China and Quebec. Juliana was in company with Moffat, or Moffatt. She arrived at Whampoa Anchorage on 25 January 1825.

Juliana and Moffatt left Canton on 24 February 1825. They kept company for 20 days but then separated off Java. They rejoined at the Cape of Good Hope, and arrived at St Helena on the same day. Juliana reached St Helena on 16 May.

Juliana andMoffatt separated again, but arrived at Quebec within hours of other. Juliana arrived at Quebec on 13 July. When they arrived, local newspapers reported that they were the first ships to come to Quebec from China.

Moffatt was the larger of the two with a burthen of around 800 tons, and carried 9,941 chests of tea. Juliana carried 5900 chests. From Quebec, both sailed on to London.

Then on 19 October, Juliana, H.Williams, master, sailed for Bombay under a license from the EIC.

The data in the table below comes from Lloyd's Register, except for the second entry for 1830, which comes from the Register of Shipping. That shows that Julianna underwent a large repair in 1827.

The reason for the repair is that in February 1827 Juliana had sailed from Bengal at the same time as Clydesdale. The two ran into each other and both had had to return to Calcutta for repairs.

Year	Master	Owner	Trade	Launch year	Burthen
1825	Fotheringham	W. Masson	London—China		521
1828	Fotheringham; Tarbutt	Captain & Co.	London—Calcutta		521
1830	Tarbutt & Co.	Captain & Co.	London—Calcutta	1814	521
1835	C. Tarbutt; Driver	Capt. & Co. Driver & Co.	London—Madras	1819	549

The increase in burthen in 1835 follows a survey in 1834 and may represent re-measurement. The change of launch year is unexplained. The online copy of Lloyd's Register for 1838 is missing pages, and Juliana is not listed in the 1839 volume.

== Fate ==
Juliana, 549 tons (bm), Driver & Co., owner, left Gravesend on 26 October 1838 with 241 emigrants for Sydney. When some fell ill Captain F.W. Lodge decided to stop at Cape Town to get fresh food and give the passengers a respite. She wrecked at about 5p.m. on 19 January 1839 in near perfect conditions off the Mouille Point Battery at Green Point. All her crew and passengers were saved and were housed in barracks. Many proceeded on to Sydney in Morayshire and Mary Hay.

Morayshire, 328 tons (bm), Captain Lamotte, left the Cape of Good Hope on 20 February. She arrived in Sydney on 20 April with merchandise and 108 emigrants from Juliana. Mary Hay, 258 tons (bm), arrived at Sydney on 19 May with 69 passengers, including one born during the voyage.
