= Roselle (ship) =

Several ships have been named Roselle:

== Roselle (1786 ship) ==
- Roselle (1786 ship) was launched in 1781 in Amsterdam, probably under another name. She entered British records in 1786. She spent much of her career as a West Indiaman, sailing between Leith and Jamaica. A Spanish warship captured her in 1798.

== Roselle (1797 ship) ==
- Roselle (1797 ship) was launched at Hull. She spent much of her career as a West Indiaman, sailing between Leith and Jamaica. An American privateer captured her in 1814 and she wrecked on the Charleston Bar as the prize crew was bringing her to an American port.

== Roselle (1824 ship) ==
- Roselle (1824 ship), of 166 tons burthen, was built at Sunderland. She may have been sold at Archangel in 1835.

== Roselle (1837 ship) ==
- Roselle (1837 ship), of 154 tons (bm), one deck and two masts, was launched at Aberdeen. She was lost on 7 November 1844.

== See also ==
- USS Roselle – one of two vessels by that name in the U.S.Navy
