= HMS Britomart (1808) =

Brig of the Royal Navy

History

United Kingdom
- Name: HMS Britomart
- Namesake: Britomaris
- Ordered: 31 December 1807
- Builder: John Dudman & Co., Deptford
- Laid down: April 1808
- Launched: 28 July 1808
- Commissioned: August 1808
- Honours and awards: Naval General Service Medal with clasp "Algiers"
- Fate: Sold 3 February 1819

United Kingdom
- Name: Britomart
- Owner: Various
- Acquired: 1819 by purchase
- Fate: Wrecked 22 December 1839

General characteristics
- Class & type: Cherokee-class brig-sloop
- Tons burthen: 238 (23911/94 by calc.), or 240, or 241, or 242 (bm)
- Length: Overall:90 ft 3 in (27.5 m); Keel:7 ft 10 5/8 in (2.4 m)
- Beam: 24 ft 8 in (7.5 m)
- Depth of hold: 8 ft 11 in (2.7 m)
- Complement: 75
- Armament: 10 × 18-pounder carronades + 2 × 6-pounder bow chase guns

HMS Britomart was a Cherokee-class brig-sloop launched in 1808. She participated in the capture of several small privateers and merchant vessels. She was also at the bombardment of Algiers (1816). The Navy sold Britomart in 1819. She then entered mercantile service. She sailed to South America, Van Dieman's Land (VDL), and the Indian Ocean. She spent much of her time sailing between England and VDL, and between VDL and the Australian mainland. She foundered in 1839 on her way between Port Phillip and Hobart.

== Royal Navy ==
Commander William Buckley Hunt commissioned Britomart in August 1808.

On 6 November 1809 Brudner, Radnean, master, which had been sailing from Reval to France, came into Yarmouth, a prize to Britomart. On 26 November Britomart captured Actief.

She took part in the ill-fated Walcheren Campaign of July–December 1809, and was one of a long list of ships who received prize money for property captured at Walcheren and adjacent islands in the Scheldt between 30 July and 16 August 1809, which was paid as the ships arrived at various ports from 6 October 1812.

In 1810, Britomart was stationed in the North Sea primarily off the Frisian Islands of Texel and Vlie to help enforce the naval blockade of that coast.

Britomart shared with Desiree in the proceeds of the capture on 5 January 1810 of Lynboom, Myden, master. That same day the two captured the American vessel Little Mary.

On 23 May 1810 Quebec captured Financier. Britomart claimed to share in the proceeds of the capture. Prize money was awarded in 1823. (Note: A first-class share of the prize money was worth £4 2s 10 3/4d; a sixth-class share, that of an ordinary seaman, was worth 1s 3 1/2d.)

On 29 May a cutting out expedition at Vlie with boats from Quebec, Desiree, Britomart, and Bold yielded a French lugger (12 guns), a French privateer (4), a Dutch gunboat, and a small rowboat. The British had no casualties; the French lost one man killed and three wounded.

Britomart recaptured Diligentia on 24 August.

Britomart and Calliope shared in the proceeds of the capture on 2 September of the Danish vessels Goede Verwagting and Frou Esje.

Britomart captured Dankbaarheit and Jonge Dirks on 11 March 1812.

Britomart, Osprey, and Leveret were in company on 16 July 1812 when they encountered the French privateer lugger Éole some 25 miles N. W. of Heligoland. Each of the British vessels launched a boat in pursuit. After a long chase Britomart's cutter and the boat from Osprey succeeded in catching up with their quarry. The French resisted forcefully and it took the British 10 minutes to reach the deck and another 10 minutes before the French struck. Éole was pierced for 14 guns but only mounted six. She had a crew of 31 under the command of Captain Dubost. She was one day out of Schiermonnkoog. In the attack Britomart had one man killed and five men wounded, and Osprey had one man killed and seven wounded. French casualties were two killed and seven wounded. Éole arrived at Yarmouth on 21 July. (Note: A first-class share of the prize money was worth £25 6s 8d; a sixth-class share was worth £1 14s 9 1/4.) (Note: Éole had been commissioned in February 1810. On her first cruise (from February to July 1810), she was under the command of Jean-Louis-Marie Berquez with 26 men and five guns. For her second cruise (1810–1811), she was under the command of Jean-Louis-François Huet, with 30 men and 4 to 5 guns. Pierre-Olivier Dubost, with 31 or 32 men, with 6 or 8 swivel guns, commanded her on her third cruise until the British captured her.)

Also in July Britomart participated in an attack on the batteries at Spikeroog, where she sustained a loss of one man killed and another wounded. On 26 July Britomart captured the French privateer Intrepid. Intrepid was armed with eight guns and had a crew of 40 men.

In August Britomart's boats cut out two vessels from beneath the protection of 20 gun-boats in the river Ems.

On 30 August 1812 Britomart captured Amitie.

Commander Hunt died off Heligoland. His First Lieutenant, Charles Tulloh, assumed command and sailed Britomart to Yarmouth. When Tulloh arrived, Britomart was ordered to the Baltic to participate in conducting 17 Russian ships of the line to England.

Britomart underwent fitting at Sheerness. There Commander Robert Riddell assumed command on 8 December 1812. In 1814 Britomart was on the Ireland station.

Britain and the Netherlands bombarded Algiers 27 August 1816 in an attempt to end the slavery practices of Omar Agha, the Dey of Algiers. An Anglo–Dutch naval force under the command of Admiral Edward Pellew, 1st Viscount Exmouth bombarded ships and the harbour defences of Algiers.

Britomart was among the smaller vessels that were present. (Note: His Royal Highness the Prince Regent awarded the participants £100,000. A first-class share was worth £1068 11s 6 1/4d; a sixth-class share was worth £4 10s 2 1/2d.)

The bombardment was partially successful. After the bombardment the Dey freed around 3,000 slaves and signed a treaty ending the slavery of Europeans. In 1847 the Admiralty authorized the issue of the clasp "Algiers" to the Naval General Service Medal to the surviving claimants from the action.

Commander Riddell went on half pay on 15 November, but Commander Constantine Richard Moorsom had already taken command on 4 October. He left on 15 November and Commander George Perceval replaced him.

Commander Bernard Yeoman nominally assumed command of Britomart in 1818.

Disposal: The "Principal Officers and Commissioners of His Majesty's Navy" offered the "Britomart brig, of 238 tons", lying at Plymouth, for sale on 3 February 1819. On that day G.Bailey purchased Britomart for £900 at Plymouth.

== Mercantile service ==
Britomart first appeared in the Register of Shipping (RS) and in Lloyd's Register (LR) in 1821. On 1 September 1821 an advertisement appeared in The Times that Britomart, Daniel Peache, commander, would be beginning a regular packet service between London and Van Diemen's Land and New South Wales, and that she had room for only a few passengers. On 31 August 1823 Britomart was at Mauritius, preparing to sail for Cowes. She arrived back in England on 18 December with a cargo of cotton and sugar from Mauritius.

| Year | Master | Owner | Trade | Source & notes |
|---|---|---|---|---|
| 1821 | Peache | J.Moxon | London–Valparaiso | RS; damages and good repair 1820 |
| 1821 | D.Peache | J.Moxon | London–Van Diemen's Land | LR; good repair 1821 |
| 1825 | J.White | Somes | Liverpool–Lima | LR; good repair 1821 |
| 1827 | J.White; Brown | Somes | Liverpool–Lima | LR; good repair 1823 |

On 4 April 1827 Britomart, J.Brown, master, sailed for Mauritius. (Note: Britomart does not appear in Hackman, the most comprehensive listing of British vessels sailing east of the Cape of Good Hope for the British East India Company or under license from it.)

A report from Mauritius dated 7 July 1827 stated that Britomart would be bringing back part of the cargo of Clydesdale, which had been condemned there. Britomart left Mauritius on 14 August, the Cape on 20 September and St Helena on 5 October. She arrived at Deal on 2 December.

Under Captain Blake (see below), Britomart served as a transport, visiting Corfu on one voyage and Fernando Po on another. She left Fernando Po on 21 January 1829 with nine pirates that HMS Eden had captured, and arrived at Deal on 1 April. She also sailed to the Bahamas. Not all of Britomart's voyages as a transport were mentioned n newspapers. Still, in 1830 she carried a company of sappers to Gibraltar.

| Year | Master | Owner | Trade | Source & notes |
|---|---|---|---|---|
| 1828 | Brown; C.Blake | Somes | London–Tenerife | LR; good repair 1823 |
| 1829 | C.Blake | Somes & Co. | Cork | LR; good repair 1823 |
| 1832 | C.Blake; Possett; J.Hurst | Somes & Co. | Cork | LR; good repair 1823 & small repair 1830 |
| 1833 | J.Hurst | Somes & Co. | London–Oporto | LR; good repair 1823 & small repair 1830 |
| 1834 | Vaughan | | London | LR |

There are reports that between 1834 and 1836 Captain William MacDonald sailed Britomart between Hobart and the Australian mainland, particularly Sydney.

| Year | Master | Owner | Trade | Source & notes |
|---|---|---|---|---|
| 1838 | Macdonald | Macdonald | London–Swan River | LR; small repairs 1837 |

== Fate ==
Britomart was wrecked on 22 December 1839 near Goose Island. She was on a voyage from Port Phillip to Hobart.

Lloyd's Register for 1840 has the annotation "missing" by her name.
