= Briton (1842 ship) =

Canadian ship (1842–1844)

History

United Kingdom
- Builder: Canada
- Launched: 1842
- Fate: Wrecked 12 November 1844

General characteristics
- Tons burthen: Old Act: 619 (bm); New Act (post 1836): 776(bm)
- Complement: 34

Briton was launched in Canada in 1842. She sailed to Britain and was registered there with homeport of Greenock. She first appeared in Lloyd's Register (LR) in the volume for 1843. She was wrecked in November 1844.

Year	Master	Owner	Trade	Source
1843	Robertson	Cuthbert	Clyde-Bombay	LR

On her second voyage Briton, Bell, master, sailed to Sydney, New South Wales. There she embarked two or three companies of the 80th Regiment of Foot, which was transferring from Sydney to Calcutta after seven years in Australia. The regiment marched out of its barracks on 12 August 1844 and embarked on four vessels: Briton, Enmore, Lloyds, and Royal Saxon. In all, there were 431 people on board Briton: her crew, the soldiers and their dependents. The vessels then got under weigh on 15 August.

Briton called at Coppang on Timor Island to replenish water and other provisions. She then reached Singapore three weeks later. Briton transited the Straits of Malacca and was sailing towards Calcutta when she encountered a cyclone on 10 November. She was driven ashore at John Lawrence Island in the Andaman Islands on 12 November.

The same gale that wrecked Briton also wrecked Runnymede, which was transporting elements of the British 10th and 50th Regiments of Foot from England to Calcutta, via Penang. The two vessels ended up about a quarter-mile from each other.

There were no losses on Briton from the wrecking, and only one on Runnymede. The survivors grouped together. After about a week they were able to repair the only surviving ship's boat, which they named Hope, and sent her to seek help. Help started to arrive after 20 days as Hope had reached Mergui, in Burma. On 28 December more supplies arrived and on 30 December so did Ayrshire and Elizabeth Ainslie. These last two evacuated the 80th Foot. On 3 January 1845 Agnes Lee arrived. She sailed on 5 January with the remaining survivors.
