= Royal Saxon (1829 ship) =

Ship

History

United Kingdom
- Name: Royal Saxon
- Owner: D. Petrie & Co.
- Builder: Liverpool
- Launched: 1829
- Fate: Last listed in Lloyd's Register in 1857

General characteristics
- Type: Barque
- Tons burthen: 510 (bm)

Royal Saxon was a British merchant ship built at Liverpool in 1829. She carried cargo and passengers to India, Australia, and the Far East. In 1839 Royal Saxon attempted to violate a Royal Navy blockade of Canton and inadvertently became the direct cause of the Battle of Chuenpi and consequently the First Opium War. She is last listed in Lloyd's Register in 1857.

== First Opium War ==
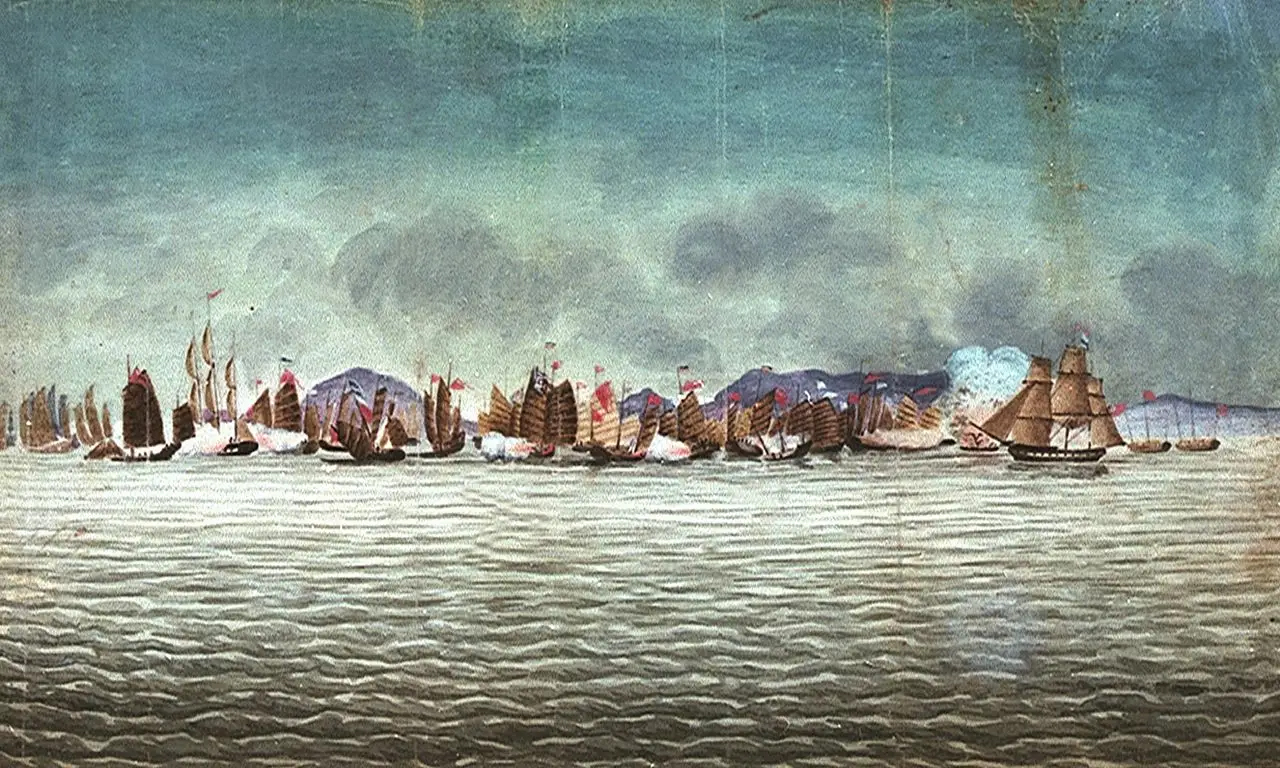
The First Battle of Chuenpi, pictured, erupted after Royal Saxon attempted to run the Royal Navy's blockade on 3 Nov. 1839.

By 1839 the opium trade was causing great tension between the British Empire and the Qing dynasty. The Chinese were concerned with the effects of opium on the general population and as such banned the substance. This action lead to the destruction of opium at Humen, an event which caused relations between Britain and China to deteriorate further. Charles Elliot, Chief Superintendent of British Trade in China, ordered British ships trading in opium to avoid Chinese ports or face sanction. However, when the Qing government issued a bond that required foreign merchants to not deal in opium if they wanted to do business in China, Elliot ordered all British shipping out of Chinese waters. Many merchants (especially those who did not participate in the opium trade) reacted negatively to Elliot's decision, feeling that the decree infringed upon their rights to trade freely. One merchant ship, the Quaker-owned Thomas Coutts, arrived in China and successfully unloaded its cargo at Canton. The Chinese allowed the merchant ship to conduct its business as it was known that the Quakers refused to deal in opium. In response to this violation, Elliot ordered a blockade of the Pearl River.

On 3 November 1839 Royal Saxon attempted to sail past the blockade and into Canton. The British warships HMS Volage and HMS Hyacinth moved to intercept the merchant, and Volage fired a warning shot across Saxon's bow. In response to this action, a fleet of Chinese war junks under the command of Guan Tianpei sailed out to protect Royal Saxon The Chinese and British ships fired on each other, beginning what would be known as the First Battle of Chuenpi. Royal Saxon herself was not involved in the action and slipped into Canton under the cover provided by the Chinese fleet.

== Later service ==
Royal Saxon continued her career as a merchant and passenger ship. From 1841 to 1844 she transported colonists and freight to Australia. She is last listed in 1857 with homeport Sydney, H. Jackson, master, Towns, owner, and trade London_Sydney.
