= Trelawney (1819 ship) =

UK merchant ship (1819–1826)

History

United Kingdom
- Name: Trelawney
- Builder: Scott & Co., Greenock
- Launched: 20 November 1819, Greenock
- Fate: Disappeared August–September 1826

General characteristics
- Tons burthen: 401, or 404 (bm)
- Length: 108 ft 4 in (33.0 m)
- Beam: 29 ft 6 in (9.0 m)

Trelawney was launched in 1819 at Greenock as a West Indiaman. She disappeared in August-September 1826 and was believed to have foundered.

== Career ==
Trelawney first appeared in online issues of Lloyd's Register (LR) in 1820.

Year	Master	Owner	Trade	Source & notes
1820	Crawford	Stirling	Greenock–Jamaica	LR

Stirling was the old Glasgow company of Stirling, Gordon & Co., which was active in the West India trade. They commissioned vessels from the preeminent shipbuilder in Greenock, John Scott & Sons. In February 1820 there appeared in the Advertiser a story that six of the finest vessels in the British mercantile marine had set sail.

A circumstance occurred on Sunday last unprecedented in the annals of the trade of the Clyde. Six of the finest vessels in the British Mercantile Marine, all of them built at this port, set sail on their first voyages to the East and West Indies and South. America. They were the Clydesdale, for Calcutta, and the Osprey, for Buenos Ayres, Valparaiso, and Calcutta, both built by R. A. Carswell; the Bellfield, for London and Calcutta; the Trelawney, for Jamaica; and the Eagle, for Barbados, built by Scott & Co.; and the Hanilla, for Jamaica, built by R. Steele & Sons.Greenock Advertiser (February 1820)

In December 1822 there appeared an advertisement in the Glasgow Herald that Trelawney, Archibald Crawford, master, was at Greenock accepting cargo, intending to sail on 20 January 1823 for Falmouth, Montego Bay, and Lucea.

Trelawney appeared in 1823 in a list of ships registered in Scotland. It showed her as being registered at Greenock, and her owner as S.Gordon & Co.

Trelawney and Crawford also appeared in a case brought before the Court of Exchequer in the year ending 5 July 1824. Crawford was charged with having a defective manifest and making a false report. He faced penalties of £101 4s 6¾d and £200. The court assessed him a fine of £20, plus £9 16s 7d in costs.

Year	Master	Owner	Trade	Source & notes
1826	Crawford	Stirling & Co.	Greenock–Jamaica	LR

== Loss ==
Lloyd's List reported in December 1826 that Trelawney, Crawford, master, had sailed from Jamaica for London on 10 August, and hadn't been heard from since. She was one of several vessels that it was feared may have foundered during heavy September winds.
