= Runnymede (1825 ship) =

History

United Kingdom
- Name: Runnymede
- Builder: William Wallis, Blackwall
- Launched: 13 October 1825
- Fate: Wrecked 1844

General characteristics
- Tons burthen: 293, or 29364/94, or 300, or 388, or 389 (bm)
- Length: 101 ft 9 in (31.0 m)
- Beam: 25 ft 3 in (7.7 m)
- Sail plan: Barque

Runnymede (or later Runymede) was a barque–rigged sailing ship built in London in 1825. She traded between Britain and India, sailing under a license from he British East India Company (EIC). She made one voyage to Tasmania in 1839–1840 transporting convicts. She also carried immigrants to New South Wales. She was wrecked in 1844.

== Career ==
Runnymede first appeared in Lloyd's Register (LR), and the Register of Shipping (RS) in 1826.

In 1813 the EIC had lost its monopoly on the trade between India and Britain. British ships were then free to sail to India or the Indian Ocean under a license from the EIC.

Year	Master	Owner	Trade	Source & notes
1826	C.Kemp	J.Krieg	London–Calcutta (Bengal)	LR
1828	C.Kemp; Wildridge	J.Krieg	London–Bengal	LR
1830	Wildridge	J.Krieg	London–Bombay	LR
1831	Wildridge	J.Krieg	London	LR; lengthened 1830
1840	Wildridge; Forman	J.Krieg	London–Sydney	LR; lengthened 1830, damages repaired 1836, & small repairs 1839

Convict transport (1839–1840): Runnymede, Captain W.B. Forward and surgeon Peter Fisher, sailed from London on 20 December 1839 and arrived in Hobart, Tasmania on 28 March 1840. She had embarked 200 male convicts and suffered no convict deaths on her voyage.

Immigrant transport (1841): Runnymede departed London on 25 April 1841 with 222 assisted emigrants, sponsored by a John Marshall. She arrived at Port Jackson on 30 August 1841.

Year	Master	Owner	Trade	Source & notes
1842	Forman	J.Krieg	London–Sydney	LR; lengthened 1830, damages repaired 1836, & small repairs 1839 & 1841
1844	Forman	J.Krieg	London	LR; lengthened 1830, damages repaired 1836, & small repairs 1839 & 1841
1844	Doutty	Hall & Co.	London–India	LR (Supple.); lengthened 1830 & thorough repair 1844

== Fate ==
Runnymede left Gravesend on 20 June 1844, transporting elements of the British 10th and 50th Regiments of Foot, and their dependents, from England to Calcutta. She rounded the Cape of Good Hope and reached Penang in October. She left Penang on 3 November for Calcutta.

A cyclone wrecked Runnymede driving her ashore on 12 November 1844 in the Andaman Islands in the Bay of Bengal. She was carrying troops from Pulau Pinang, Straits Settlements, to Calcutta. One of the 199 people on board was lost. Her entry in the supplemental pages of LR for 1844 bore the annotation "wrecked".

The same gale that wrecked Runnymede also wrecked Briton. Briton was carrying elements of the 80th Regiment of Foot, which was transferring from Sydney to Calcutta. The two vessels independently ended up wrecked on John Lawrence Island about a quarter of a mile apart.

The survivors grouped together. After about a week they were able to repair the only surviving ship's boat, which they named Hope, and sent her to seek help. Help started to arrive after 20 days as Hope had reached Mergui, in Burma. On 28 December more supplies arrived and on 30 December, so did Ayrshire and Elizabeth Ainslie. These last two vessels evacuated the 80th Foot. On 3 January 1845 Agnes Lee arrived. She sailed on 5 January with the remaining survivors.
