= Roselle (1797 ship) =

History

Great Britain
- Name: Roselle
- Launched: 1797, Hull
- Captured: 2 December 1814
- Fate: Wrecked 7 December 1814

General characteristics
- Tons burthen: 260, or 264 (bm)
- Complement: 1798:20; 1811:30
- Armament: 1798:2 × 4-pounder guns + 10 × 12-pounder carronades; 1805:8 × 6-pounder guns; 1811:4 × 6-pounder guns + 12 × 18&12 pounder carronades; 1815:4 × 6–pounder guns + 8 × 18-pounder + 4 × 12-pounder carronades

Roselle was launched at Hull in 1797. She spent much of her career as a West Indiaman, sailing between Leith and Jamaica. An American privateer captured her in 1814 and she wrecked on the Charleston Bar as the prize crew was bringing her to an American port.

== Career ==
Roselle first appeared in Lloyd's Register (LR) in 1798 with Gourlay, master, Sibbald & Co., owners, and trade Leith–Jamaica. Sibbald & Co. had owned another Roselle, which had also sailed between Leith and Jamaica, and which was last listed in 1798. Captain David Gourley acquired a letter of marque on 31 January 1798.

Year	Master	Owner	Trade	Source
1799	D.Gourlay; J.Staples	Sibbald & Co.	Leith–Jamaica	LR
1805	J.Staples; W.Gray	Sibbald & Co.	Leith–Jamaica	LR

Captain Staples had been a captain for Sibbald & Co.'s earlier Roselle. Captain William Gray acquired a letter of marque on 27 July 1811.

Year	Master	Owner	Trade	Source & notes
1812	W.Gray	Sibbald & Co.	Leith–Jamaica	LR; repairs 1808 & 1810
1815	W.Gray	Sibbald & Co.	Leith–Jamaica	LR; repairs 1810

== Fate ==
On 24 November 1814 Roselle sailed from Havana in convoy. Not long after, an American privateer of 14 guns captured Roselle, of Leith, Beatson, master at 31°00′N 70°10′W. The privateer also captured several other British merchantmen as well. The capture took place on 2 December, and the privateer was Kemp. Roselle subsequently was wrecked at Charleston, South Carolina.

An American account of the action reports that the convoy's escort, HMS Ister, had separated from the convoy the day before while chasing Kemp. Kemp returned to the convoy; Ister did not.

Kemp was a schooner of 228 tons (bm). At the time of her attack on the convoy she was armed with 12 guns and had a crew of 130 men under the command of Captain Wilson Jacobs. The convoy consisted of eight merchantmen with 46 guns and 134 men. Jacobs skillfully maneuvered Kemp to capture four of the merchantmen, Roselle among them. (Two more struck, but then escaped before Kemp could return to them to put a prize crew aboard.

The American account of the action refers to Roselle as Rosabella. Ten men from Kemp succeeded in boarding Roselle and capturing her, wounding three of her crew members in the process. She was carrying coffee and sugar, with her captors estimating the value of her cargo at $2–300,000.

As Roselle approached Charleston she was wrecked on the Charleston Bar. Later, a Royal Navy brig burnt the wreck.
