= Roselle (1786 ship) =

- Builder: Amsterdam
- Launched: 1781
- Fate: Sold c.1785

Great Britain
- Name: Roselle
- Acquired: c.1785 by purchase
- Captured: 8 January 1798
- Fate: Last listed in 1798

General characteristics
- Tons burthen: 320, or 351 (bm)
- Complement: 1793:26; 1796:26
- Armament: 1793:10 × 4-pounder guns + 2 × 12-pounder carronades + 2 swivel guns; 1796:10 × 4&12-pounder cannons + 2 swivel guns; 1798:10 × 42-pounder guns + 4 × 18-pounder carronades

Roselle was launched in 1781 in Amsterdam, probably under another name. She entered British records in 1786. She spent much of her career as a West Indiaman, sailing between Leith and Jamaica. A Spanish warship captured her in 1798.

== Career ==
Roselle first appeared in Lloyd's Register (LR) in 1786.

On 21 October 1786, an advertisement appeared in the Edinburgh Evening Courant announcing that Roselle was planning to sail to Jamaica. The Scottish poet Robert Burns had been offered a position as a bookkeeper on a slave plantation in Jamaica that he was considering accepting. Roselle was one of three vessels on which he booked passage, though in the end he did not accept the position. The artist Graham Fagen used the sketch in the advertisement as inspiration of his own print of Roselle for the National Galleries of Scotland.

Year	Master	Owner	Trade	Source & notes
1786	T.Hogg	Sims & Co.	London–Quebec	LR
1790	T.Hogg; T.Liddle	Sims & Co. Sibbald & Co.	Jamaica–Leith	LR
1793	T.Liddle	Sibbald & Co.	London–Jamaica	LR; repairs 1791 & 1792

War with France had broken out in early 1793. Captain Robert Liddell acquired a letter of marque on 15 November 1793.

Captain John Stables acquired a letter of marque on 11 February 1796.

Year	Master	Owner	Trade	Source & notes
1796	T.Liddle; J.Stables	Sibbald & Co.	Leith–Jamaica	LR; repairs 1791 & 1792, & good repair 1795

On 13 June 1797, Lloyd's List (LL) reported that Roselle, Liddle, master, had arrived at Jamaica from Leith with an American brig that she had recaptured. The brig had been sailing from Martinique to Boston. The brig was Neptune, of 138 tons burthen, of Boston, William Blanchard, master. The French privateer schooner Trippone had captured her on 7 April, and had put a prize crew aboard. Neptune delivered Blanchard and his crew to St Thomas. She then proceeded on her way to Curacao, on which journey Roselle recaptured her. The Vice admiralty court at St. Jago de la Vega, Jamaica, awarded Roselle, John Staples, master, one-sixth of the value of the brig, plus costs and expenses to the captors.

== Fate ==
On 8 January 1798, a Spanish warship of 64-guns, captured Roselle and took her into Havana. Roselle had been on her way from Jamaica to Norfolk. The Spanish warship was Juno, of twenty-six 12-pounder guns, eight 6-pounder guns, and four "pedreros" of 3-pounds. She had a crew of 294 men. Lieutenant of frigates Vicente Lago sailed her to Havana, on the way outsailing two large British vessels that tried to recapture Roselle. Roselle and another British vessel, Henry, also taken in prize, were worth 100,000 pesos.

The Spanish took Roselle into service under the command of Vicente Lago. Later, while captain of the schooner Aragonesa, he beat another English schooner of much superior force on the coast of Cartagena de Indias.

Roselle was last listed in LR in 1798. In 1798 Sibbald & Co., acquired a second Roselle.
