= Clydesdale (1819 ship) =

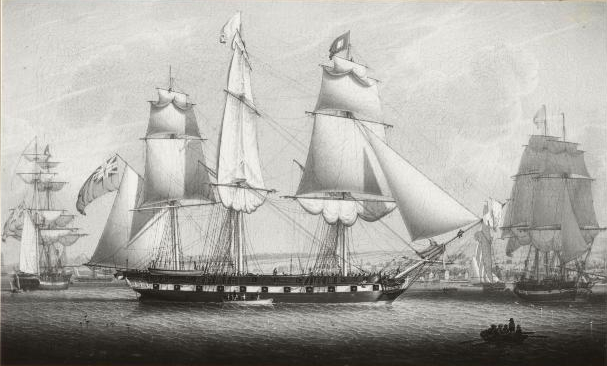
- The Clydesdale, painted by Robert Salmon, off Greenock

History

United Kingdom
- Name: Clydesdale
- Owner: Denniston Buchanan & Co.
- Builder: R & A Carsewell, Greenock
- Launched: 7 July 1819
- Fate: Condemned 1827

General characteristics
- Tons burthen: 582, or 58289/94, or 583, or 584 (bm)
- Length: 123 ft 0 in (37.5 m)
- Beam: 32 ft 9 in (10.0 m)
- Depth of hold: 7 ft 0 in (2.1 m)

The ship Clydesdale was launched at Bay of Quick, Greenock in 1819. She sailed as an East Indiaman under a licence from the British East India Company (EIC). She was condemned at Mauritius circa June 1827 as unseaworthy while homeward bound from Bengal.

== Career ==
The partnership of R. & A. Carsewell commenced building vessels in 1816. Clydesdale, at 584 tons (bm), was the largest vessel they launched. (Note: The partnership of Steele and Carsewell began building vessels at the Bay of Quick in 1796. One vessel that they built, in 1815, was Bengal, the first vessel built in Scotland for the India trade. Carsewell established a branch of the firm in 1815 at Port-Glasgow, but when he died in 1816, the partnership ended. Robert Steele & Co. then established itself at the eastern end of Greenock. R. & A. Carsewell at Bay of Quick.)

R & A Carsewell launched Clydesdale in July 1819, for the East India trade. In 1813 the British East India Company (EIC) had lost its monopoly on the trade between India and Britain. British ships were then free to sail to India or the Indian Ocean under a licence from the EIC.

In December 1819 the following advertisement appeared.

For Calcutta, to call at Madras if sufficient Encouragement offers, the new ship CLYDESDALE, Duncan M'Kellar, commander, burthen 583 tons, coppered and copper fastened: she is in every respect a first class vessel and has very superior accommodation for Passengers, having two elegant large cabins, commodious state-rooms, and an experienced Surgeon on board; is now ready to receive goods, and will sail early in January.

Clydesdale did not sail until February.

A circumstance occurred on Sunday last unprecedented in the annals of the trade of the Clyde. Six of the finest vessels in the British Mercantile Marine, all of them built at this port, set sail on their first voyages to the East and West Indies and South. America. They were the Clydesdale, for Calcutta, and the Osprey, for Buenos Ayres, Valparaiso, and Calcutta, both built by R. A. Carswell; (Note: Osprey, of 387 tons (bm), was built for D.Laird. Her master was M'Gill.) the Bellfield, for London and Calcutta; the Trelawney, for Jamaica; and the Eagle, for Barbados, built by Scott & Co.; and the Hanilla, for Jamaica, built by R. Steele & Sons.Greenock Advertiser (February 1820)

Clydesdale first appeared in Lloyd's Register (LR) in the supplemental pages in 1819.

Year	Master	Owner	Trade	Source
1819	M'Kellar	Buchanan	Greenock–Calcutta	LR

Lloyd's Register reported that Clydesdale, M'Kellar, master, sailed for Calcutta on 20 February 1820. In addition to other cargo, she carried 720,000 yards of cotton goods. She arrived back in the Clyde on 5 March 1821, having left Bengal on about 28 October 1820, and from the Cape of Good Hope on 23 December. Later in 1821 she again sailed for Bengal.

Next, for her third voyage, Clydesdale sailed to Van Diemen's Land and New South Wales. In 1822 she brought as passengers Richard Aspinall, Warham Jemmett Browne, and Thomas Aspinall, nephew of Richard. In 1821 Richard and Edward Aspinall and Browne had established the trading firm of Aspinall, Browne & Co. in Liverpool. Richard Aspinall and Browne brought with them a large assortment of trade goods. They established the firm of Aspinall Browne & Co. in Sydney, with the intent of acquiring wool for Liverpool. From Sydney Clydesdale sailed for Calcutta.

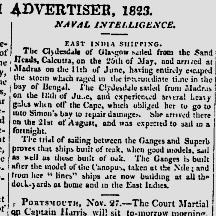
1823 Edinburgh Advertiser report of the Clydesdale of Glasgow

Year	Master	Owner	Trade	Source
1823	M'Kellar	Brown & Co.	Liverpool–New South Wales	LR
1824	M'Kellar; Morris	Brown & Co.	Liverpool–New South Wales	LR
1825	A.Morris	Brown & Co.	Liverpool–Calcutta	LR
1826	Rose	Captain & Co.	London–Bengal	LR

In 1826 Clydesdale, Rose, master, sailed for Madras and Bengal. In February 1827, she sailed from Bengal, but collided with Juliana. Both were damaged and had to return to repair damages. Clydesdale finally left Bengal for England on 15 March 1827.

== Fate ==
On her voyage back to England on 23 May she put in to Port Louis, Mauritius leaky. She was surveyed, condemned as unseaworthy, and sold for breaking up. Rose and his officers blamed her leaks on the damage she had sustained in her collision with Juliana.

A report from Mauritius dated 7 July 1827 stated that the merchant vessel Britomart would be bringing back part of Clydesdale's cargo as Clydesdale had been condemned there. Britomart left Mauritius on 14 August, the Cape on 20 September, and St Helena on 5 October. She arrived at Deal on 2 December.
