= Rosella (1819 ship) =

History

United Kingdom
- Name: Rosella
- Builder: William Smith, St Peter's Dockyard, Newcastle
- Launched: 1819
- Fate: Wrecked 24 August 1860

General characteristics
- Tons burthen: 213, or 214 (bm)
- Length: 83 ft 1 in (25.3 m)
- Beam: 24 ft 7 in (7.5 m)

Rosella was launched in 1819 at Newcastle upon Tyne. She made one voyage to Sincapore and possibly one to Bengal, both under a licence from the British East India Company (EIC). She sailed widely until she was wrecked in 1860.

== Career ==
Rosella first appeared in Lloyd's Register (LR) in 1821.

Year	Master	Owner	Trade	Source
1821	Atkinson	Smith & Co.	Cowes–Peterburg; Plymouth–New York.	LR
1825	T.Atkinson	Smith & Co.	Liverpool–Madeira	LR
1826	Robson; Pike	Smith & co.	Liverpool–Sincapore	LR

On 3 April 1826 Rosella, Evans, master, arrived at Cowes, and at Gravesend on 16 April. She had left Sumatra on 24 September 1825 and the Cape on 31 December. She had arrived at the Cape on 16 December from Padang, having sustained damage.

On 16 August 1826 Rosella, Pyke, master, sailed for Bengal under a license from the EIC. Rosella, Tuke, master, arrived at Plymouth on 27 August, on her way to Bengal. On 29 August a survey on Rosella at Plymouth condemned her mainmast and two yards.

Unfortunately, there is no online Lloyd's List SAD data available after 1826. Although LR continued to show Rosella with trade London–Calcutta for some more years, there is no confirmation in the listing of licensed ships of any voyages after 1826.

On 6 October 1827, Rosella, Pyke, master, wrote a letter to her owners from Plymouth. On her way back from Bengal, Rosella had struck a hidden rock some two miles of the Bolt Head. There was so much damage to her rudder and wheel that Pyke was obliged to get a Cowes pilot boat to take her up to the Mewstone.

Year	Master	Owner	Trade	Source & notes
1827	Robson	Pyke & Co.	London–Calcutta	LR
1830	Robson	Pyke & Co.	London–Calcutta	LR
1832	Windsp'r; T.Milburn	Graham's	London–Calcutta	LR
1832	Gordon	Graham	Antwerp–Greenland	Register of Shipping (RS); damages repaired 1828

On 25 September 1828 Captain Gordon, master of Rosella, wrote from Monte Video that she had cleared customs, but that he did not expect that she would be able to sail upriver until 7 November when the blockade was expected to be lifted.

Year	Master	Owner	Trade	Source & notes
1837	J.Finlay	R.Trotter	Newcastle–Baltic	LR
1840	W.Holborn	Thew & Co.	Shields–London; Shields–Baltic	LR; small repairs 1840
1845	Holburn	Holburn	Shields–London	LR
1847	W.Hilburn	W.Hilburn		LR

== Fate ==
Rosella was last listed in LR in 1847 with stale data.

One source, with continuous ownership data, reports that Rosella was lost on 24 August 1860 while carrying coal from South Shields to Rotterdam. It states that she sank off Egmond aan Zee, in the North Sea nine miles from Rotterdam.
