= Danster ǃUi =

Extinct ǃKwi language of Southern Africa

- Region: South Africa
- Extinct: Late 20th century
- Language family: Tuu: ǃKwi; Danster ǃUi
- Dialects: ǂUngkue; ǁKā

Language codes
- ISO 639-3: gku ǂUngkue
- Glottolog: dans1240

Danster ǃUi is an extinct ǃKwi language of the Vaal River region of South Africa. It comprised the ǂUngkue dialect (also rendered ǂKunkwe) of the Warrenton area, recorded by Carl Meinhof, and the neighboring ǁKā dialect recorded by Dorothea Bleek.

== Doculects ==
Güldemann (2019) lists the following doculects as being Danster ǃUi.

Label	Researcher	Date	Location	Notes
ǂUngkue	Meinhof	1928–1929	Warrenton-Windsorton, near Kimberley	Mislabeled ǁkhau; it is not ǁKhʼau, which is variety of Nǀuu.) D. Bleek label SIIb.
ǁKā	D. Bleek	> 1920	Warrenton	

Güldemann is agnostic as to whether these form a single language, but they are accepted as such by Glottolog.

== Sources ==
- Structural isoglosses between Khoekhoe and Tuu: the Cape as a linguistic area by Tom Güldemann
