= GKU =

GKU may refer to:

- Guru Kashi University, in Punjab, India
- ǂUngkue language
