= Boshof ǃUi =

Extinct ǃKwi language of Southern Africa

- ǃUi
- Native to: South Africa
- Region: Boshof
- Extinct: mid 20th century
- Language family: Tuu: ǃKwi; Eastern; Vaal–Orange; Boshof ǃUi

Language codes
- ISO 639-3: None (mis)
- Glottolog: bosh1244

Boshof ǃUi is an extinct ǃKwi language or dialect of South Africa. It was recorded at the town of Boshof, between Kimberley and the Vaal River, by Maingard some time after 1930, and labeled simply "ǃUi" (that is, ǃKwi), the word for 'person' in Boshof and related languages. It is closely related to Seroa, but analysis of the recorded data has not been enough to determine the boundary between language and dialect.
