= Alexei Mirtov =

Russian linguist (1886–1966)

Alexei Vasilkovich Mirtov
- Алексей Василькович Миртов
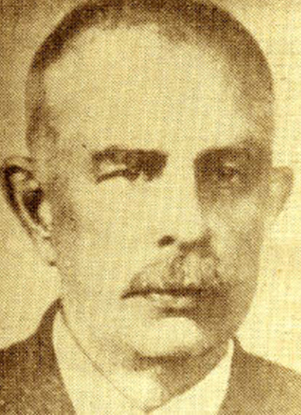
- Born: Alexei Vasilkovich Mirtov; 8 August 1886; Simbirsk, Russian Empire
- Died: 3 January 1966 (aged 79); Gorky, USSR
- Occupation: Linguist

Alexei Vasilkovich Mirtov (Russian: Алексей Василькович Миртов; 8 August 1886, Simbirsk – 3 January 1966, Gorky) was a Russian linguist and a major specialist in the field of the history of language, dialectology and modern Russian language. He was a professor and Doctor of Philological Sciences.

== Biography ==
Mirtov was born on 8 August 1886 in Simbirsk (present-day Ulyanovsk). In 1906 he enrolled at the Faculty of History and Philology of Saint Petersburg Imperial University and graduated it with a diploma of the I degree. Among his teachers were Filipp Fortunatov, Jan Baudouin de Courtenay and Aleksey Shakhmatov.

In 1911 he was invited by to teach Russian language and literature at Smolny Institute, and in 1913, at Higher Women Courses at Moscow Alexander Institute, where he read lectures about methodology of Russian language and introduction to linguistics.

In 1919 he was elected Director of the Teacher's Institute in Krasnodar and took part in its reorganization into a pedagogical institute.

From 1920 onwards he worked at the Don Pedagogical Institute in Novocherkassk, where he was Dean of the Literary and Historical Faculty. In the spring of 1925 he started working at Rostov State University, where he read a course of Russian language (scientific grammar course), dialectology and methodology of Russian language. In 1928 he became a member of the Dialectological Commission of the USSR Academy of Sciences.

In 1930 he became a Professor. From 1929 to 1931 he was the Head of the Department of Russian linguistics at Perm University. It is known that in 1931 he was also the Head of the Literary Department of the University.

Since 1931 he was the Dean of the Literary Faculty of Perm Pedagogical Institute.

From 1941 to 1945, he was in charge of the Department of Russian language at the Central Asian University, in from 1947 to 1949 he worked at Yaroslavl Pedagogical Institute.

In 1943 he defended his doctoral thesis "Category of the grammatical gender in Russian language".

From 1949 to 1961 he was the Head of the Department of Russian Language and General Linguistics at Gorky University.
