= ǁKā dialect =

Extinct ǃKwi language of Southern Africa

ǁKā
- Native to: South Africa
- Extinct: Late 20th century
- Language family: Tuu: ǃKwi; Ghaap-Khalahari; Danster ǃUi; ǁKā

Language codes
- ISO 639-3: (covered in [gku] ǂUngkue)
- Glottolog: kaaa1239 ǁKã

ǁKā is an extinct ǃKwi speech variety of the Vaal River region of South Africa. It was spoken in the Warrenton area, and recorded by Dorothea Bleek. It is closely related to the neighbouring ǂUngkue, but whether they were dialects or distinct languages has not been determined.
