= ǁKuǁʼe language =

Extinct ǃKwi language of Southern Africa

ǁKuǁʼe
- ǁŨǁʼe
- Native to: South Africa
- Region: Theunissen
- Extinct: mid 20th century
- Language family: Tuu: ǃKwi; Eastern; Vaal–Orange; ǁKuǁʼe

Language codes
- ISO 639-3: kqu (partial)
- Glottolog: kuee1238 ǁKuǁe
- ||Ku||'e [sic] is classified as Extinct by the UNESCO Atlas of the World's Languages in Danger

ǁKuǁʼe, also rendered ǁŨǁʼe, ǁKu-ǁʼe or ǁKuǁe, is an extinct ǃKwi language or dialect of South Africa, spoken near Theunissen in South Africa, and recorded by Dorothea Bleek in 1928. It was labeled "SIIc" in her classification. It is closely related to Seroa, but analysis of the recorded data has not been enough to determine the boundary between language and dialect.
