= Aka language (disambiguation) =

Aka can refer to at least three languages:

- Aka language (Sudan)
- Aka language (Central African Republic)
- Hruso language (India)

Additionally, several Andamanese languages have Aka in their names, where it simply means "language":

- Aka-Bea
- Aka-Bo
- Aka-Cari
- Aka-Jeru
- Aka-Kede
- Aka-Kol

== See also ==
- Akha language
