= ǃGãǃne language =

Extinct Tuu language of South Africa

ǃGãǃne
- South Eastern Bushman
- Native to: South Africa
- Region: near Tsolo
- Era: attested 1931
- Language family: Tuu: ǃKwi; Eastern; ǃGãǃne

Language codes
- ISO 639-3: (covered by ser Seroa)
- Glottolog: gane1238
- !Gan!ne is classified as Extinct by the UNESCO Atlas of the World's Languages in Danger

ǃGãǃne (South Eastern Bushman) is an extinct language of the ǃKwi family which was once spoken near Tsolo and in Mthatha District in South Africa, south of Lesotho. It is very poorly attested, with the only material being 140 words collected from two semi-speakers in 1931.

The name ǃgã ǃne was the name of the tribe one of Anders' two informants belonged to.

Like ǁXegwi, ǃGãǃne is considered an "outlier" among the ǃKwi languages by Güldemann (2005, 2011).
