= Seroa =

Extinct ǃKwi language of Southern Africa

- ǃUi
- Native to: South Africa
- Region: Bloemfontein
- Ethnicity: ǃUi
- Extinct: 1870s
- Language family: Tuu: ǃKwi; Eastern; Vaal–Orange; Seroa

Language codes
- ISO 639-3: kqu
- Glottolog: sero1239

Seroa, or ǃUi, is a ǃKwi language or dialect of South Africa that went extinct in the 19th century. It was spoken in the area of Bloemfontein. Seroa is the Sesotho name, literally "language of the Baroa (Bushmen)"; the people called themselves ǃUi (that is, ǃKwi), which just means 'people'. The language is labeled SIId in Dorothea Bleek's classification.

== Doculects ==
Güldemann (2019) lists the following doculects.

Label	Researcher	Date	Origin	Notes
ǃUi	Wuras	> 1836	Bethany	Bleek label SIId.
ǃUi	Arbousset	1836	Mokhasi/Puchane	Bleek label SIId.

Seroa was closely related to ǁKuǁʼe and Boshof ǃUi, but analysis of the recorded data has not been enough to determine the boundary between language and dialect.
