= Tambora language =

Language of the lost Tambora culture of Sumbawa, present-day Indonesia

Tambora
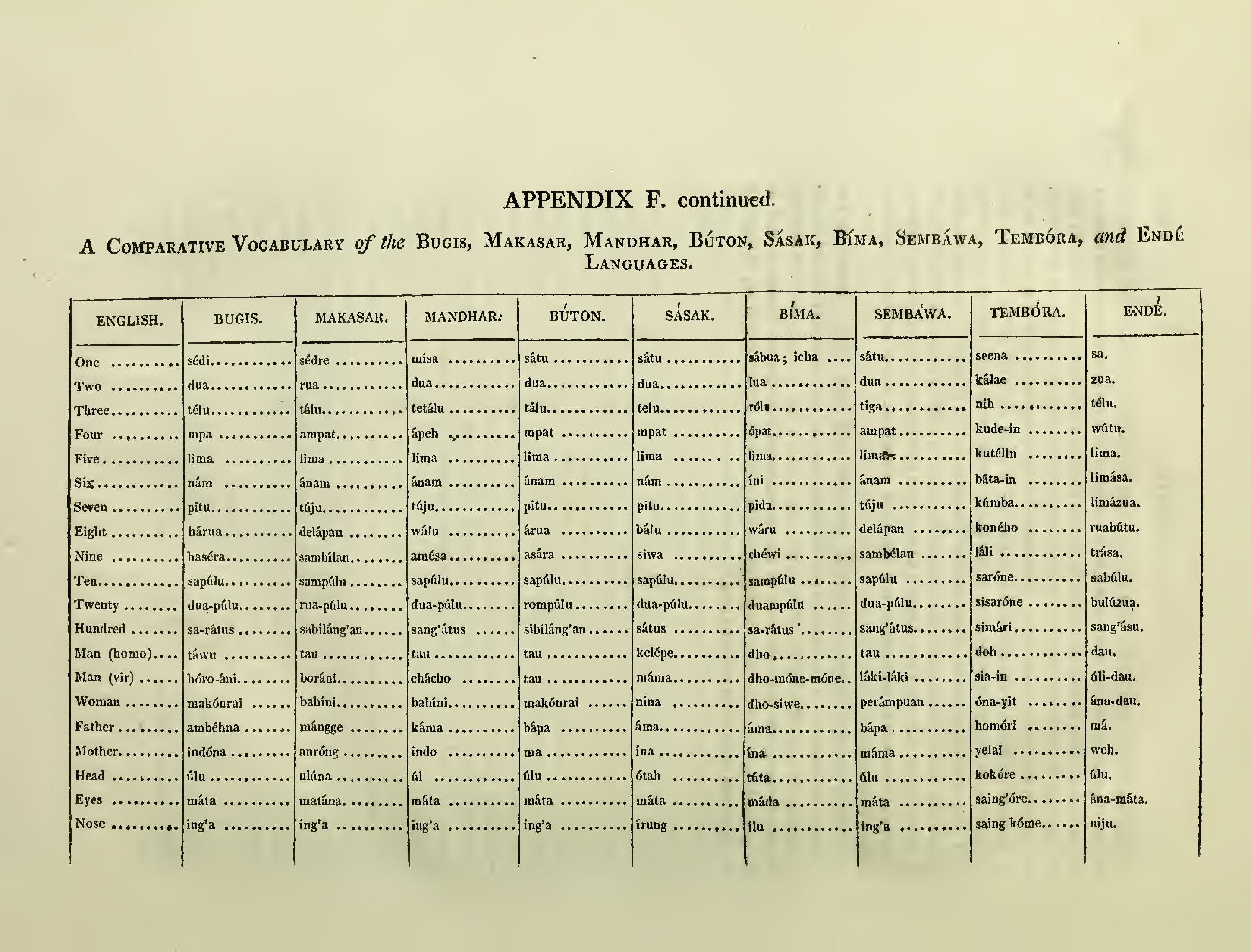
- Comparative vocabulary including Tambora words (second column from right), from Raffles' The History of Java
- Native to: Indonesia
- Region: Sumbawa
- Ethnicity: Tambora culture
- Extinct: c. 1815
- Language family: unclassified (probable language isolate); non-Austronesian based on existing basic vocabulary

Language codes
- ISO 639-3: xxt
- Glottolog: tamb1257
- Location within Indonesia
- Coordinates: 8.25°S 118°E

Tambora was the language of the Tambora culture of Sumbawa, which was made extinct by the 1815 eruption of Mount Tambora. It was the westernmost known Papuan language and was relatively unusual among such languages in being the language of a maritime trading state, though contemporary Papuan trading states were also found off Halmahera in Ternate and Tidore.

== Vocabulary ==
The language is poorly attested. One word list was collected prior to the eruption, published as Raffles (1817, 1830). It is clear from this that the language is not Austronesian; as there are only a few Austronesian loans.

In the list below, it is presumed that ⟨ng'⟩ transcribes [ŋ] and ⟨dj⟩ [dʒ]. Hyphen is possibly a glottal stop [ʔ]. Two words, búlu and mákan, are clearly Malay loans. Zollinger (1850) identified several possible loans from other Austronesian languages; Tambora was a regional trading power, so a number of loans might be expected. The connection of taintu with the Papuan Timor–Alor–Pantar *tan(a), if not coincidence, would presumably be genetic, not a loan. However, Harald Hammarström considers it to be a language isolate.

| Tambora | gloss | Tambora | gloss |
|---|---|---|---|
| seena (AN?) | 'one' | maimpo | 'foot' |
| kálae | 'two' | kiro | 'blood' |
| nih | 'three' | kóngkong | 'day' |
| kude-in | 'four' | tádung | 'night' |
| kutélin | 'five' | kidjum | 'sleep' |
| báta-in | 'six' | sílam | 'dead' |
| kúmba | 'seven' | si-yang (Z: Malay?) | 'white' |
| koného | 'eight' | naido | 'black' |
| láli | 'nine' | sámar | 'good' |
| saróne | 'ten' | gonóre | 'bad' |
| sisaróne | 'twenty' | maing'aing | 'fire' |
| simári | 'one hundred' | naino (Z: Madura) | 'water' |
| doh (Bima) | 'person' | gónong (Z: Malay?) | 'earth' |
| sia-in (Z: Sangar) | 'man' | ilah | 'stone' |
| óna-yit | 'woman' | kíwu | 'pig' |
| homóri | 'father' | kilaíngkong | 'bird' |
| yelai | 'mother' | andik (Z: Javanese) | 'egg' |
| kokóre | 'head' | karáyi | 'fish' |
| saing'óre | 'eye' | ingkong | 'sun' |
| saing kóme | 'nose' | mang'ong | 'moon' |
| búlu (Malay: bulu) | 'hair' | kingkong | 'star' |
| sóntong | 'teeth' | mákan (Malay: makan) | 'eat' |
| sumóre | 'belly' | hok-hok (Z: German?) | 'sit' |
| taintu (Timor?) | 'hand' | moríhoh (Sanskrit?) | 'God' |

=== Analysis ===
Donohue notes that word lists of this size from other Indonesian languages with relatively small consonant inventories typically succeed in recording all consonants, so the same might be expected here, apart from consonants which could not be transcribed with Malay orthographic conventions, such as the implosives found in the region. P only occurs after m, and may be a reflex of h, as in other languages of the area. Overall, the phonemic profile is consistent with many languages of eastern Indonesia: that is, to the east but not to the west of Tambora.

Hok-hok 'sit' suggests verbal reduplication, but the only other verb, makan, is an obvious Malay loan.

Saing'óre 'eye', saing kóme 'nose', sóntong 'teeth', sumóre 'belly' all begin similarly, suggesting a prefix, possibly a possessive prefix, with a nasal -ng' that assimilates to a following consonant, and with sumóre 'belly' presumably from *more or *pore.

Several of the numbers begin with sV-, a common pattern in Austronesian languages where 'one' is reduced to a prefix. Indeed, seena 'one' is a possible Austronesian loan. Donohue suggests that sarone 'ten' ~ sisarone 'twenty' may reflect an earlier vigesimal system, possibly from sa- 'one' doh 'person' -ne (suffix), a common way of counting 'twenty' in the region. 'Twenty' might then have shifted to meaning 'ten' under the influence of decimal trading partners.

The word moríhoh 'God' reflects a common term in the area, of uncertain but perhaps Sanskrit derivation. In Tambora, however, it also resembles homóri 'father', suggesting that neither word can be assumed to be native.

Donohue notes one word, taintu 'hand', which is plausibly connected to other Papuan languages, those of Timor and Alor to the east: Abui taŋ, Oirata tana, Kui tan. This leaves the -tu as a possible suffix, and the similar shape of maimpo 'foot' suggests to Donohue that these may derive from tayn and maym plus a suffix -ho or -hu which assimilates to the preceding consonant.

A number of words end in -(k)ong and -ore, and the former are semantically similar (ingkong 'sun', kóngkong 'day', mang'ong 'moon', kingkong 'star'), suggesting possible suffixes, though they might simply be coincidence.

== See also ==
- Tambora culture
