= Vaal–Orange language =

Extinct ǃKwi language of Southern Africa

Vaal–Orange
- Region: South Africa, Lesotho
- Extinct: Late 20th century
- Language family: Tuu: ǃKwi; Vaal–Orange
- Dialects: ǁKuǁʼe; Seroa; Boshof ǃUi

Language codes
- ISO 639-3: kqu (Seroa)
- Glottolog: vaal1235

Vaal–Orange is an extinct ǃKwi language of South Africa and Lesotho. It comprised the ǁKuǁʼe dialect (also rendered ǁKu-ǁʼe, ǁŨǁʼe or ǁKuǁe), spoken near Theunissen and Bethany in South Africa and into Lesotho, recorded by Dorothea Bleek, the Seroa dialect, and the Boshof dialect.

The name "Vaal–Orange" comes from the Vaal and Orange Rivers, which converge where the ǂUngkue language was spoken, though ǂUngkue is no longer classified as Vaal–Orange.

== Doculects ==
Güldemann (2019) lists the following doculects.

Label	Researcher	Date	Origin	Notes
ǁkuǁe (ǁŨǁʼe)	D. Bleek	1928	Theunissen	Bleek label SIIc.
seroa (ǃUi)	Wuras	1919–1920	Bethany	Bleek label SIId.
ǃUi	Arbousset	1836	Mokhasi/Puchane	Bleek label SIId.
ǃUi	Maingard	> 1930	Boshof	

All but ǃUi of Boshof were lumped under Vaal–Orange in Güldemann (2018). Güldemann (2019) is more agnostic, but keeps them close (and also close with Boshof); Glottolog concludes that they form a single language with each other and with Boshof. The ǂUngkue language was included by Güldemann (2018) but classified as closer to Nǀuu by Güldemann (2019).

== Sources ==
- Structural isoglosses between Khoekhoe and Tuu: the Cape as a linguistic area by Tom Güldemann
