= Akarbale =

Extinct Southern Great Andamanese of India

Bale
- Balawa
- Akar-Bale
- Native to: India
- Region: Andaman Islands; Ritchie’s Archipelago, Havelock Island, Neill Island.
- Ethnicity: Bale
- Extinct: by 1951
- Language family: Great Andamanese: Southern †; Bale

Language codes
- ISO 639-3: acl
- Glottolog: akar1243
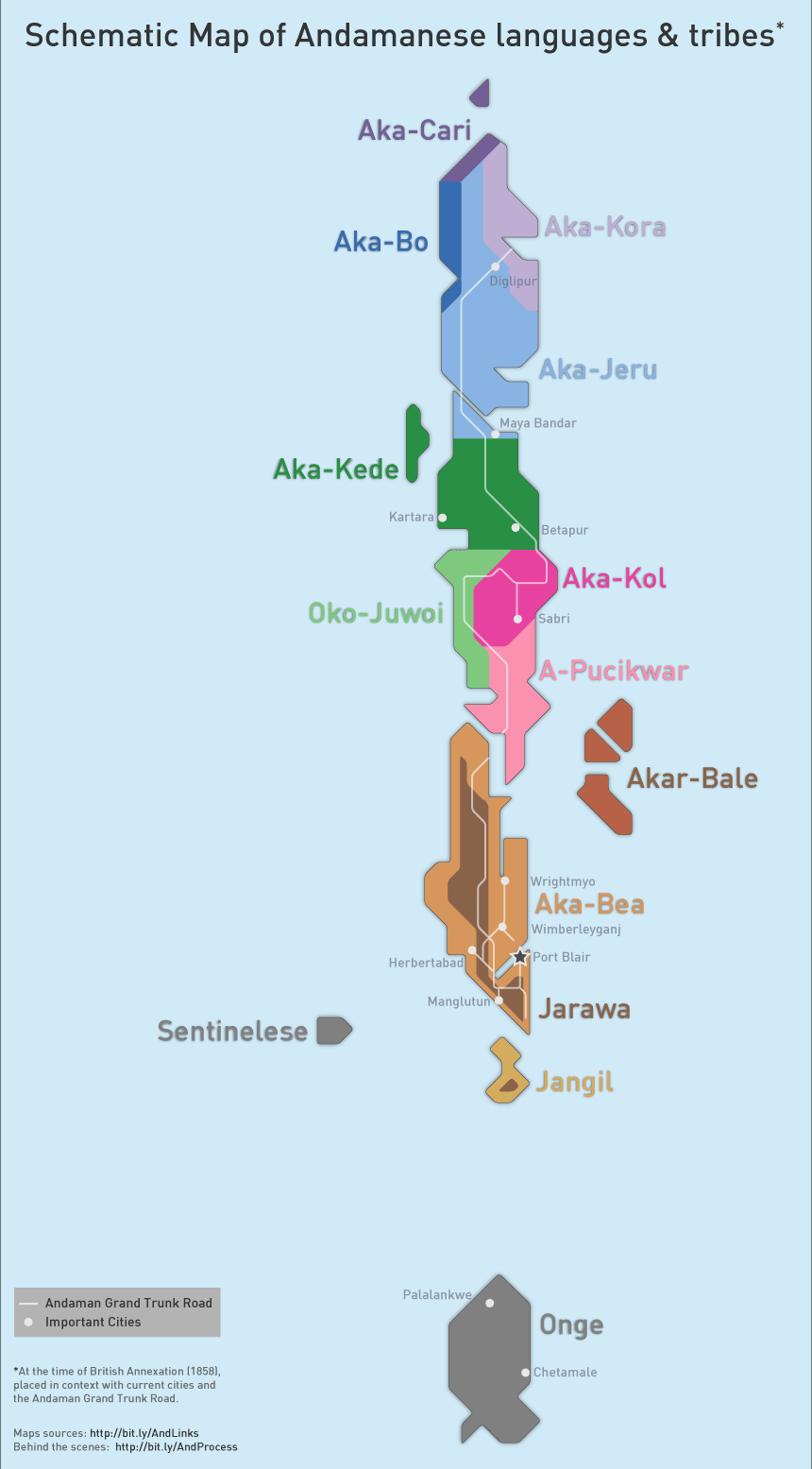
- Akar-Bale

The Bale language, Akar-Bale (also Balwa or Balawa), is an extinct Southern Great Andamanese language once spoken in the Andaman Islands in Ritchie's Archipelago, Havelock Island, and Neill Island.

== History ==
The Bale disappeared as a distinct people sometime after 1931. There were only two speakers in the 1930s.

== Classification ==
The closest relative to Akarbale is Akabea; the two languages make up the Southern branch of the Great Andamanese languages.

== Geographic distribution ==
Akarbale was spoken in Ritchie's Archipelago.

== Dialects ==
Maurice Vidal Portman reported two distinct dialects of Akarbale, divided by the Havelock and Lawrence Islands..

== Phonology ==
Portman noted a "lingual, thick t" which he did not find in any other language known to him. He also referred to o as the "distinguishing vowel" of the language. Word-final k changes to g before another consonant:

rák 'a pig' : rág-dóamo 'pig's flesh'

== Grammar ==
The Great Andamanese languages are agglutinative languages, with an extensive prefix and suffix system. They have a distinctive noun class system based largely on body parts, in which every noun and adjective may take a prefix according to which body part it is associated with (on the basis of shape, or functional association). Thus, for instance, the *aka- at the beginning of the language names is a prefix for objects related to the tongue.

The prefixes are:

	Balawa
head/heart	ôt-
hand/foot	ong-
mouth/tongue	aka-
torso (shoulder to shins)	ab-
eye/face/arm/breast	id-
back/leg/butt	ar-

Body parts are inalienably possessed, requiring a possessive adjective prefix to complete them, so one cannot say "head" alone, but only "my, or his, or your, etc. head".

The basic pronouns are almost identical throughout the Great Andamanese languages.

'This' and 'that' are distinguished as k- and t-.

Judging from the available sources, the Great Andamanese languages have only two cardinal numbers — one and two — and their entire numerical lexicon is one, two, one more, some more, and all.

== See also ==
- Andamanese languages
