= Tambora culture =

Lost village and culture on Sumbawa Island, Indonesia

Coordinates: 8.25°S 118°E

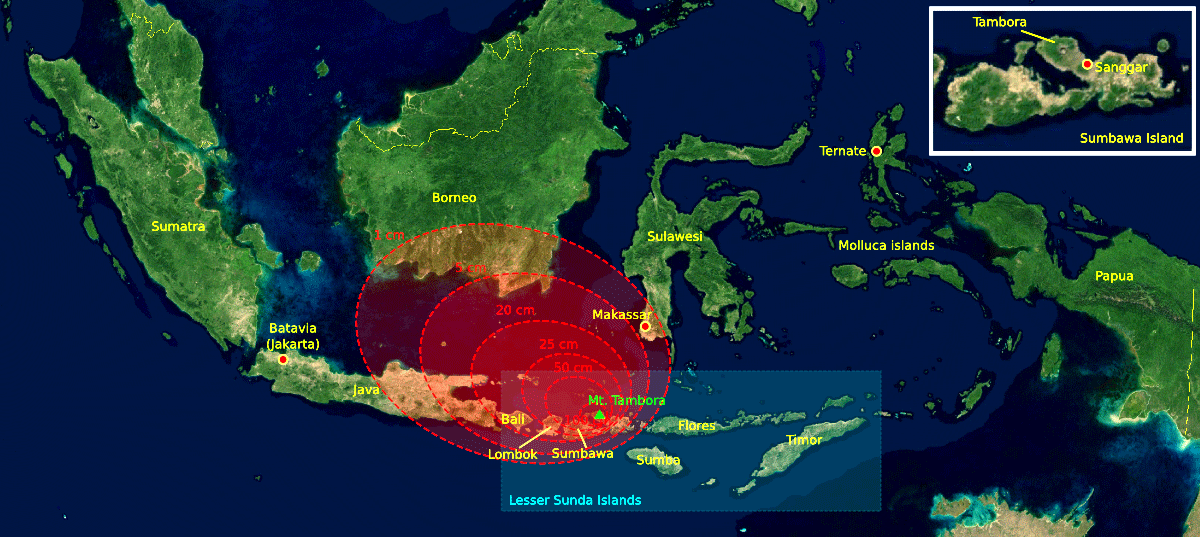
The Tambora culture, its city, and its language were wiped out by the 1815 eruption of Mount Tambora (pictured)

Tambora is a lost city and culture on Sumbawa Island buried by volcanic ash and pyroclastic flows from the massive 1815 eruption of Mount Tambora. The city had about 10,000 residents. Scientists unearthing the site have discovered ceramic pots, bronze bowls, glass bottles, and homes and inhabitants buried by ash in a manner similar to that of Pompeii. The language of the culture was wiped out. The language appears to have been an isolate, the last survivor of the pre-Austronesian languages of central Indonesia. The city was visited by western explorers shortly before its demise. It is believed to have traded with Indochina, as Tambora pottery resembles that found in Vietnam.

== Excavations ==
=== 2004 work ===
In summer 2004, a team from the University of Rhode Island, the University of North Carolina Wilmington, and the Indonesian Directorate of Volcanology, led by Haraldur Sigurðsson, began an archaeological excavation in Tambora. Over six weeks, the team unearthed the first evidence of a lost culture that had been obliterated by the Tambora eruption. The site is located about 15 miles (24 km) from the volcano, deep in the jungle, 3 miles (4.8 km) from the shore. The team had to cut through a deposit of volcanic pumice and ash 3 metres (9.8 ft) thick.

The team used a ground-penetrating radar to locate a small buried house. They excavated the house, where they found the remains of two adults, as well as bronze bowls, ceramic pots, iron tools and other artifacts. The design and decoration of the artifacts have similarities with artifacts from Vietnam and Cambodia. Tests conducted using a carbonization technique revealed they were composed of charcoal formed by the heat of the magma. The people and the house are preserved as they were in 1815. Sigurðsson dubbed it the Pompeii of the East. Based on the artifacts found, which were mainly bronze objects, the team concluded that the people were not poor. Historical evidence indicates that people on Sumbawa were known in the East Indies for their honey, horses, sappan wood for producing red dye, and sandalwood for incense and medications. The area was thought to be highly productive agriculturally.

The archaeological findings suggest that a distinct culture was destroyed by the 1815 eruption. The title Lost Kingdom of Tambora was coined by the media. With this discovery, Sigurðsson had planned to return to Tambora in 2007 to search for the rest of the villages, and hopefully to find a palace, but could not find ash shallow enough for excavation.

=== Further work ===
In 2006, a team from the Bandung Geological Museum conducted excavations at the site, followed by the National Archaeology Research Institute in 2007. The excavations uncovered further artifacts, remnants of building roofs, and tools such as knives. Further studies were conducted by the Denpasar Archaeology Institute in 2008–2011.

== See also ==
- Year Without a Summer
