= Kott =

Kott or Kött is a surname of German, Polish, Czech, and also Yiddish origins.

- Alexander Kott (born 1973), Russian film director
- Christoph Florentius Kött (1801–1873), German bishop
- Gary Kott (born 1947), American television writer
- Jan Kott (1914–2001), Polish writer
- Micheal Kott (born 1961), American actor
- Pete Kott (born 1949), American politician
- Phillip Kott (born 1952), American statistician
- Vladimir Kott (born 1973), Russian film and stagedirector
- Wilhelmina Kott (1880–1994), American supercentenarian

== See also ==
- Kott language, an extinct language in Russia
- Kot
