= Tuu languages =

Language family of Botswana and South Africa

Tuu
- ǃUi–Taa; Southern Khoisan (obsolete)
- Geographic distribution: Botswana, South Africa, Namibia
- Linguistic classification: One of the world's primary language families
- Subdivisions: Taa; ǃKwi

Language codes
- Glottolog: tuuu1241
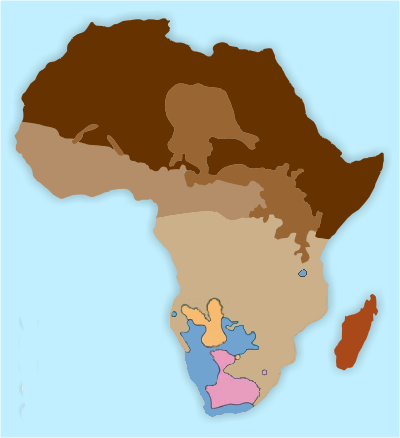
- Historic range of Tuu languages in pink

The Tuu languages, or Taa–ǃKwi (Taa–ǃUi, ǃUi–Taa, Kwi) languages, are a language family consisting of two language clusters spoken in Botswana, South Africa and Namibia. The relationship between the two clusters is not doubted, but is distant. The name Tuu comes from a word common to both branches of the family for "person".

== History ==
The ancestor of Tuu languages, Proto-Tuu, was presumably also spoken in or around the Kalahari desert, as a word for the gemsbok (*ǃhai) is reconstructable to Proto-Tuu.

There is evidence of substantial borrowing of words between Tuu languages and other Khoisan languages, including basic vocabulary. Khoekhoe in particular is thought to have a Tuu (ǃKwi-branch) substrate.

Examples of borrowings from Khoe into Tuu include 'chest' (ǃXóõ gǁúu from Khoe *gǁuu) and 'chin' (Nǁng gǃann from Khoe *ǃann). A root for 'louse' shared by some Khoe and Tuu languages (ǁxóni~kxʼuni~kxʼuri) has been suggested as deriving from a 'pre-Tuu/pre-Khoe substrate'.

== Classification ==
The Tuu languages are not demonstrably related to any other language family, though they do share many similarities to the languages of the Kxʼa family. This is generally thought to be due to thousands of years of contact and mutual influence (a sprachbund), but some scholars believe that the two families may eventually prove to be related.

The Tuu languages, along with neighboring ǂʼAmkoe, are known for being the only languages in the world to have bilabial clicks as distinctive speech sounds (apart from the ritual jargon Damin of northern Australia, which was not anyone's mother tongue and has now fallen into disuse). Taa, ǂʼAmkoe and neighboring Gǀui (of the Khoe family) form a sprachbund with the most complex inventories of consonants in the world, and among the more complex inventories of vowels. All languages in these three families also have tone.

The Tuu languages were once classified as a branch of the now-obsolete Khoisan language family, and in that conception were called Southern Khoisan.

== Languages ==
The languages and their relationships are thought to be as follows. In several places there is not enough data to distinguish language from dialect:

- Tuu
  - Taa
    - ǃXóõ (a dialect cluster)
    - Lower Nossob † (two dialects, ǀʼAuni and ǀHaasi)
  - ǃKwi (ǃUi)
    - ǀXam † (a dialect cluster, including Nǀuusaa)
    - Eastern languages/dialects
      - ǁXegwi †
      - Seroa †
      - ǁKuǁʼe †
      - Boshof ǃUi †
      - ǃGãǃne †
    - Ghaap-Khalahari
      - Nǁng (a dialect cluster; moribund)
      - Danster ǃUi:
        - ǂUngkue †
        - ǁKā †

The ǃKwi (ǃUi) branch of South Africa is moribund, with only one language extant, Nǁng, and that with only one elderly speaker. ǃKwi languages were once widespread across South Africa; the most famous, ǀXam, was the source of the modern national motto of that nation, ǃke eː ǀxarra ǁke.

The Taa branch of Botswana is more robust, though it also has only one surviving language, ǃXóõ, with 2,500 speakers.

Because many of the Tuu languages became extinct with little record, there is considerable confusion as to which of their many names represented separate languages or even dialects. The term "Vaal–Orange" was once used for ǂUngkue (formerly spoken at the confluence of the Vaal and Orange Rivers) combined with several of the Eastern lects, such as Seroa, ǁKuǁʼe, and Boshof, which have since been separated.

There were presumably additional Tuu languages. Westphal studied a Taa variety variously rendered ǀŋamani, ǀnamani, Ngǀamani, ǀŋamasa. It is apparently now extinct. Bleek recorded another now-extinct variety, which she labeled 'S5', in the town of Khakhea; it is known in the literature as Kakia. Another in the Nossop area (labeled 'S4a') is known as Xaitia, Khatia, Katia, Kattea. Vaalpens, ǀKusi, and ǀEikusi evidently refer to the same variety as Xatia. Westphal (1971) lists them both as Nǀamani dialects, though Köhler lists only Khatia and classifies it as ǃKwi. They are classified as members of the Taa dialect cluster by Güldemann (2008).

== Sources ==
- Güldemann, Tom (2006). "The San languages of southern Namibia: Linguistic appraisal with special reference to J. G. Krönlein's Nǀuusaa data". Anthropological Linguistics. 48 (4): 369–395.
- Story, Robert (1999). Traill, Anthony (ed.). "Kʼuǀha꞉si Manuscript". Khoisan Forum Working Paper. 13. Köln: University of Köln: 18–34. (MS collections of the Kiǀhazi dialect of Bushman, 1937)
