= ǂUngkue dialect =

Extinct ǃKwi language of Southern Africa

ǂUngkue
- ǁKhʼau
- Native to: South Africa
- Region: Vaal River
- Extinct: mid 20th century
- Language family: Tuu: ǃKwi; Ghaap-Khalahari; Danster ǃUi; ǂUngkue

Language codes
- ISO 639-3: gku
- Glottolog: kxau1242

ǂUngkue is an extinct ǃKwi speech variety of the Vaal River region of South Africa, with records of it being spoken in Warrenton. It was recorded by Carl Meinhof, and was closely related to the neighboring ǁKā dialect recorded by Dorothea Bleek; they in turn are related to Nǁng, which has a single remaining speaker as of 2023. ǂUngkue has the Bleek label SIIb.

Like ǀXam, ǂUngkue used 'inclusory' pronouns for compound subjects:

ǃhoeti nan koro nan tuē n a ǁʼa
lion and jackal and ostrich they ?PAST go
'The lion and jackal and ostrich, they went'.

== Doculects ==
Güldemann (2019) lists the following doculect:

Label	Researcher	Date	Location	Notes
ǁKhʼau	Meinhof	1929	Warrenton-Windsorton	Bleek label SIIb.
