= The Sisters (Andaman Islands) =

Two small islands in the Andaman Archipelago

Sister Islands
- Location within Andaman and Nicobar Islands

Geography
- Location: Bay of Bengal
- Coordinates: 11.145°N 92.725°E
- Archipelago: Andaman Islands
- Adjacent to: Indian Ocean
- Total islands: 2
- Major islands: East; West
- Area: 0.49 km^{2} (0.19 sq mi)
- Highest elevation: 76 m (249 ft)
- Highest point: East Sister

Administration
- India
- District: South Andaman
- Island group: Andaman Islands
- Island sub-group: Rutland Archipelago
- Tehsil: Port Blair Tehsil

Demographics
- Population: 0 (2011)

Additional information
- Time zone: IST (UTC+5:30)
- PIN: 744202
- Telephone code: 031927
- ISO code: IN-AN-00
- Official website: www.and.nic.in

Sister Islands are a group of uninhabited islands of the Andaman Islands. They belong to the South Andaman administrative district, part of the Indian union territory of Andaman and Nicobar Islands. These islands are 57 km (35 mi) south from Port Blair.

== History ==
Before the British established a colony on the Andaman, the Sister islands were visited occasionally by the Onge people of Little Andaman Island for fishing. They may have been a waystation for their temporary settlement of Rutland Island between 1890 and 1930.

The islands have been a wildlife refuge since 1987, with 0.36 km^{2}.

== Geography ==
The islands belong to the Rutland Archipelago and are located south of Passage Island (Andaman). The islands are located at the northern side of the Duncan Passage, about 6 km southeast of Passage Island and 18 km north of North Brother. The group consists of:

- East Sister Island (Andaman)
- West Sister Island (Andaman)

The islands are 220 m apart, connected by a coral reef. They are covered by forests and have rocky shores except for a beach on the NW side of East Sister. East Sister Island is 76m high and West Sister Island is 70.7m high.

== Administration ==
Politically, Sister Islands are part of Port Blair Taluk.
