= The Brothers (Andaman Islands) =

- Location within Andaman and Nicobar Islands

Geography
- Location: Bay of Bengal
- Coordinates: 10.95°N 92.64°E
- Archipelago: Andaman Islands
- Adjacent to: Indian Ocean
- Total islands: 2
- Major islands: South; North
- Area: 2.2 km^{2} (0.85 sq mi)
- Highest elevation: 27 m (89 ft)

Administration
- India
- District: South Andaman
- Island group: Andaman Islands
- Island sub-group: Little Andaman Group
- Tehsil: Little Andaman Tehsil

Demographics
- Population: 0 (2011)

Additional information
- Time zone: IST (UTC+5:30)
- PIN: 744202
- Telephone code: 031927
- ISO code: IN-AN-00
- Official website: www.and.nic.in

North and South Brother Islands are uninhabited islands in the Indian Ocean, part of the Andaman Archipelago. They belong to the South Andaman administrative district, part of the Indian union territory of Andaman and Nicobar Islands. These islands are 75 km (47 mi) south of Port Blair.

== Geography ==
The islands belong to the Little Andaman Group, and are located 10 km (6 mi) northeast of Little Andaman. There is a lighthouse at the top of the tallest hill on North Brother, established 1993. The Lighthouse is about half a Km from the landing point. The islands are almost flat, thickly wooded islands fringed by reef around.

== Administration ==
Politically, the islands are part of Little Andaman Tehsil.

== Demographics ==
The islands are uninhabited.

== Image gallery ==
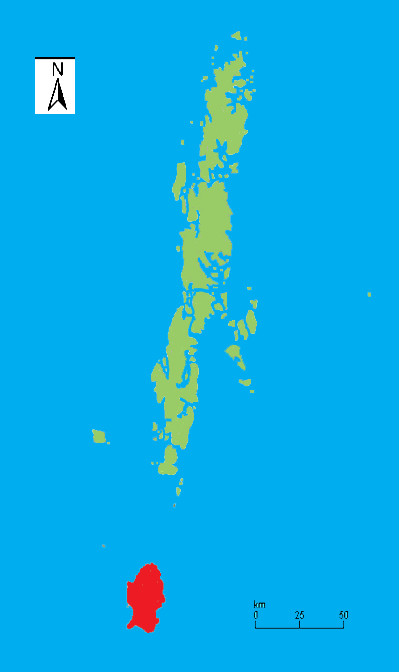
Outline map of the Andaman Islands, with the location of Little Andaman highlighted (in red).

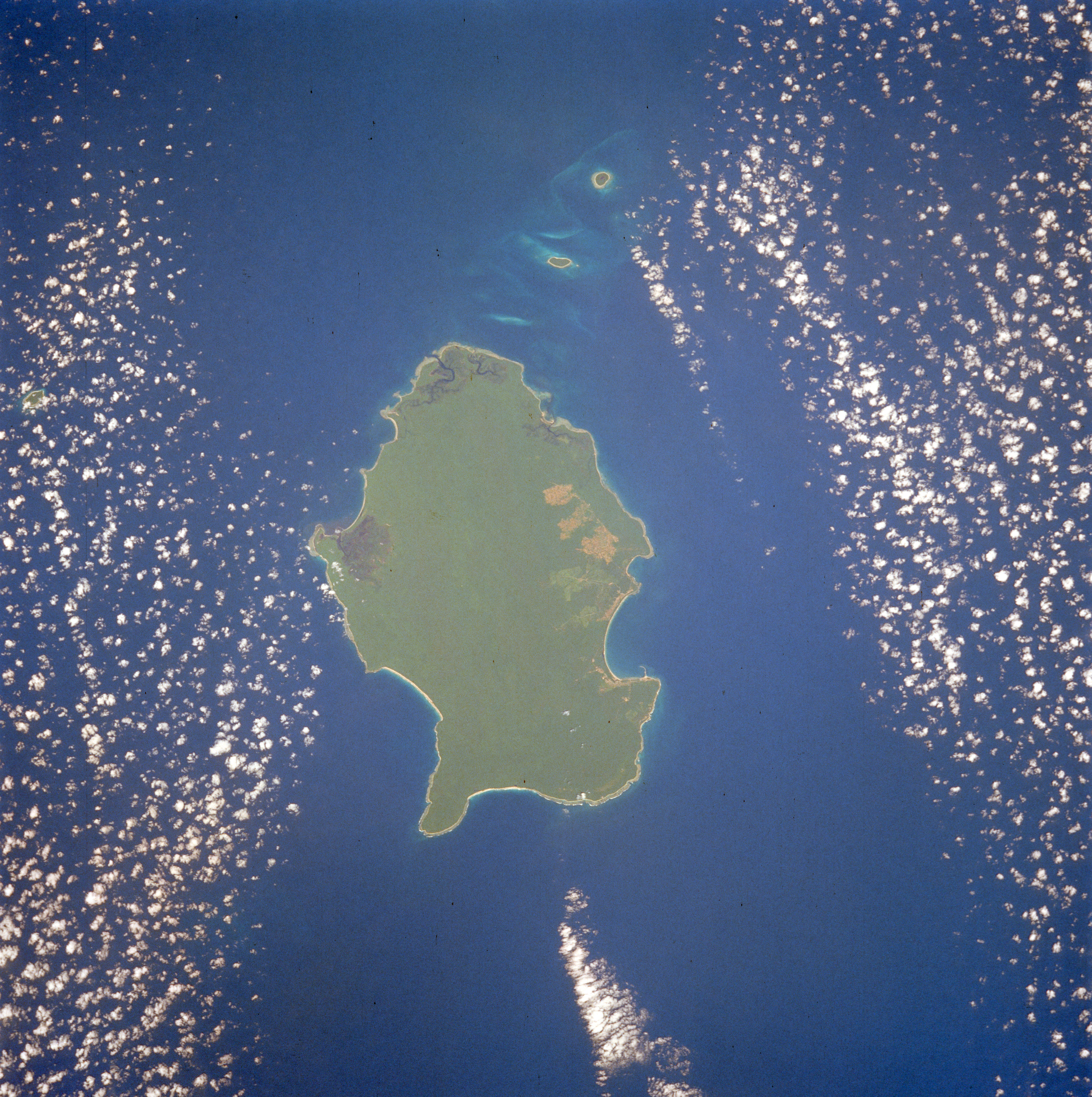
1990 Space Shuttle image of Little Andaman
