= East Sister =

East Sister can refer to:

- East Sister (Nevada), the highest mountain completely within Lyon County, Nevada.
- East Sister Island, an island in Lake Erie.
- East Sister Island (Andaman), an island in the Andaman Archipelago of the Bay of Bengal.
