= Cinque Islands =

Islands in the Andaman Archipelago, India

Coordinates: 11°16′N 92°42′E

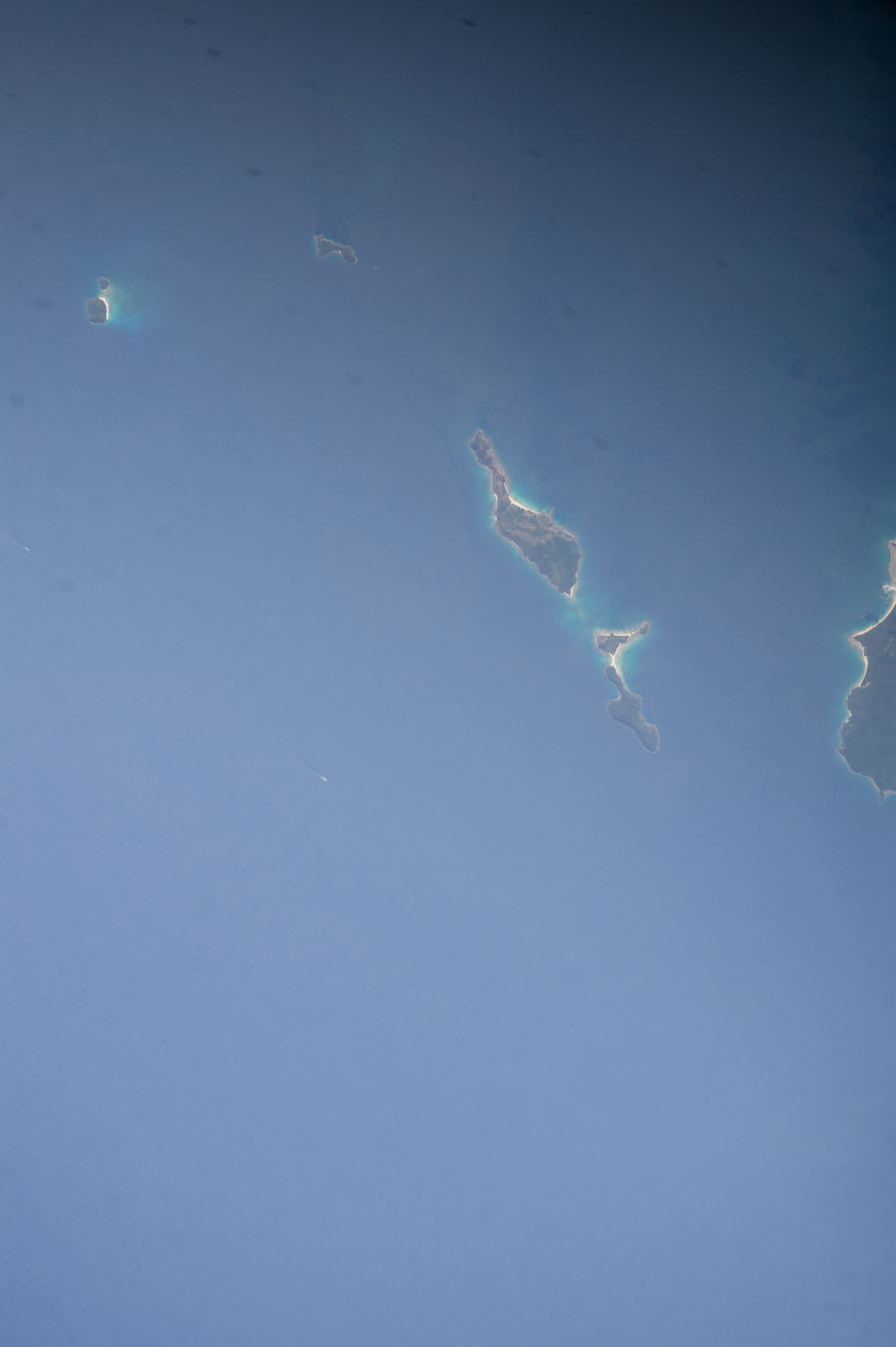
Cinque Islands from above

The Cinque Islands are a pair of islands in the Andaman Archipelago, on the north side of Duncan Passage, between Rutland Island and Passage Island. They are part of the Andaman and Nicobar Islands Union Territory of India.

- North Cinque Island
- South Cinque Island

The Cinque Islands are a famous underwater diving spot. The strait between North Cinque and Rutland is called Manners Strait.
