= West Sister Island (Andaman Islands) =

Coordinates: 11.142435°N 92.72404°E

West Sister Island or Te-joma-de is a small uninhabited island in the Andaman Archipelago, at the northern side of the Duncan Passage, about 6 km southeast of Passage Island and 18 km north of North Brother.

The island is pear-shaped, about 380 m long in the NE-SW direction and 340 m wide at the base. It is mostly covered by forest, and has a rocky shore all around, except for a tiny beach at the NE tip. Its highest point is 71 m above sea level.

West Sister and the larger East Sister, located about 250 m to the northeast, comprise the group called The Sisters. They belong to the Andaman and Nicobar Islands Territory of India.
