= East Sister Island =

East Sister Island can refer to:

- East Sister Island (Andaman and Nicobar Islands), an Indian island
- East Sister Island (Ontario), an island in Ontario, Canada
