= East Sister Island (Andaman Islands) =

Coordinates: 11.145519°N 92.730778°E

East Sister Island or Takoa-te is a small uninhabited island in the Andaman Archipelago, at the northern side of the Duncan Passage, about 6 km southeast of Passage Island and 18 km north of North Brother.

The island is roughly rectangular, around 750 m long in the NE-SW direction and 550 m wide, and is mostly covered by forest; it has a beach on the NW side and a rocky shore on the three other sides. Its highest point is 76 m above sea level.

East Sister and the smaller West Sister, located about 250 m to the southwest, comprise the group called The Sisters. It belongs to the Andaman and Nicobar Islands Territory of India.
