= Little Andaman Group =

Group of islands of the Andaman Islands

Little Andaman Island
- Location within Andaman and Nicobar Islands Location within Bay of Bengal

Geography
- Location: Bay of Bengal
- Coordinates: 10.65°N 92.49°E
- Archipelago: Andaman Islands
- Adjacent to: Indian Ocean
- Total islands: 1
- Major islands: Little Andaman
- Area: 709.2 km^{2} (273.8 sq mi)
- Highest elevation: 183 m (600 ft)

Administration
- India
- District: South Andaman
- Island group: Andaman Islands
- Tehsil: Little Andaman Tehsil
- Largest settlement: Kwate-tu-Kwage (Hut Bay)

Demographics
- Population: 18823 (2011)
- Pop. density: 26.5/km^{2} (68.6/sq mi)
- Ethnic groups: Hindu, Andamanese

Additional information
- Time zone: IST (UTC+5:30)
- PIN: 744202
- Telephone code: 031927
- ISO code: IN-AN-00
- Official website: www.and.nic.in
- Literacy: 84.4%
- Avg. summer temperature: 30.2 °C (86.4 °F)
- Avg. winter temperature: 23.0 °C (73.4 °F)
- Sex ratio: 1.2♂/♀
- Census Code: 35.640.0009
- Official Languages: Hindi, English

Little Andaman Group is a group of islands of the Andaman Islands, which include all islands south of Duncan Passage. It belongs to the South Andaman administrative district, part of the Indian union territory of Andaman and Nicobar Islands.

== Geography ==
The group includes The Brothers (Andaman), and Little Andaman Island.

== Administration ==
Politically, Little Andaman group is also a tehsil of Andaman.

== Demographics ==
The main village of Kwate-tu-Kwage is located on Hut Bay. only Little Andaman island is inhabited.

== Image gallery ==
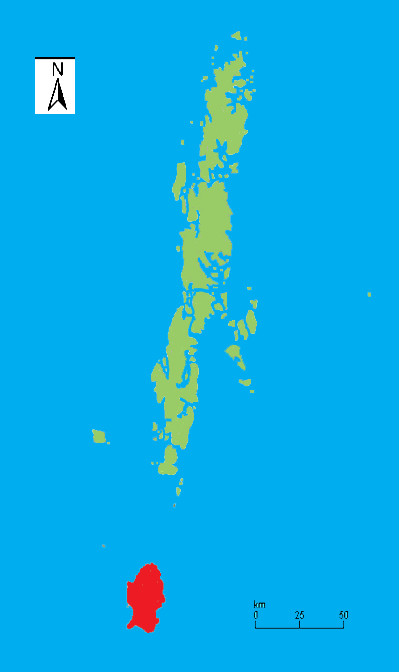
Outline map of the Andaman Islands, with the location of Little Andaman highlighted (in red).

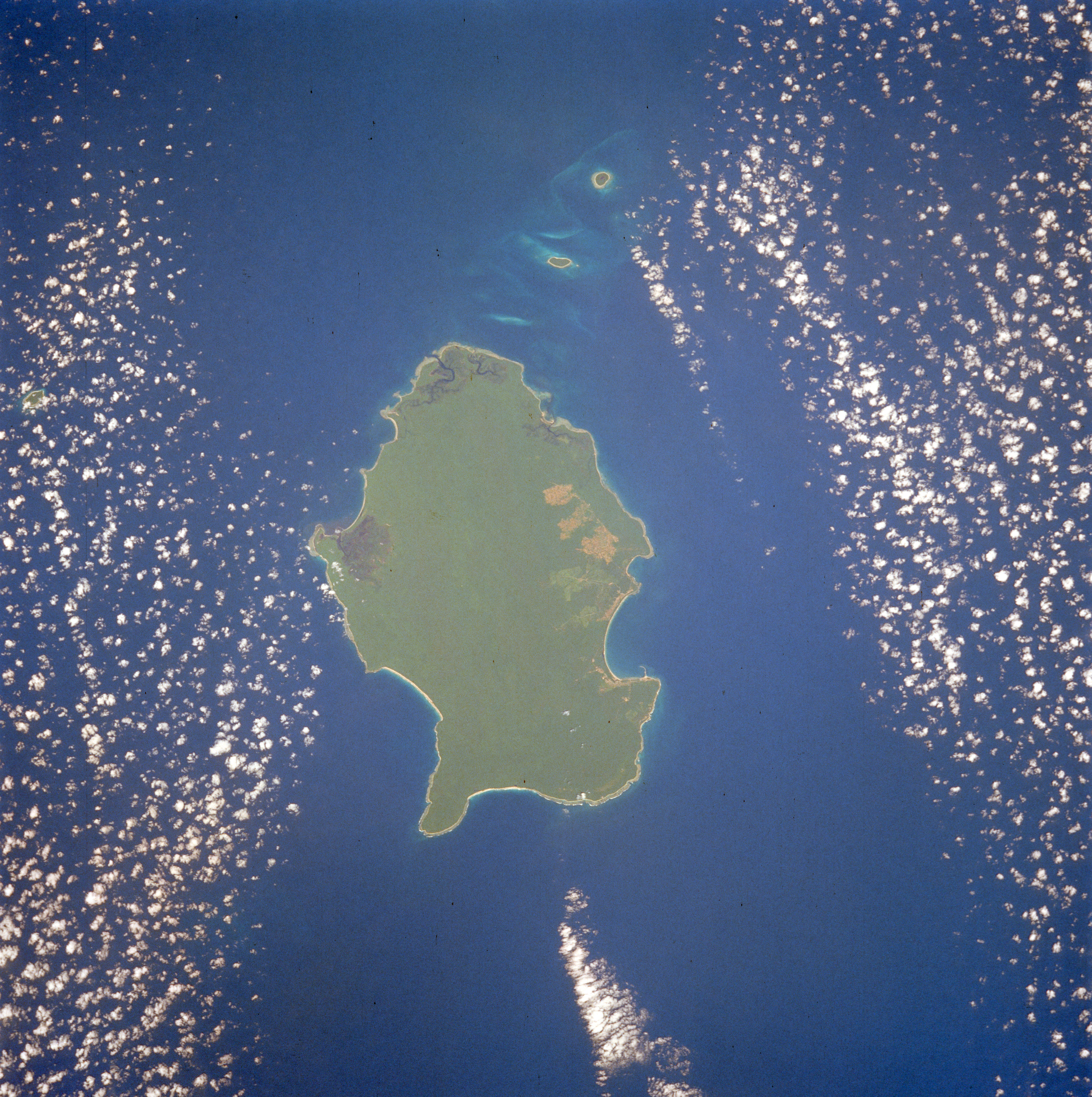
1990 Space Shuttle image of Little Andaman
