= Dwarf blenny =

Dwarf blenny may refer to the following fish species:

- Acanthemblemaria paula
- Alloblennius parvus
- Starksia nanodes
