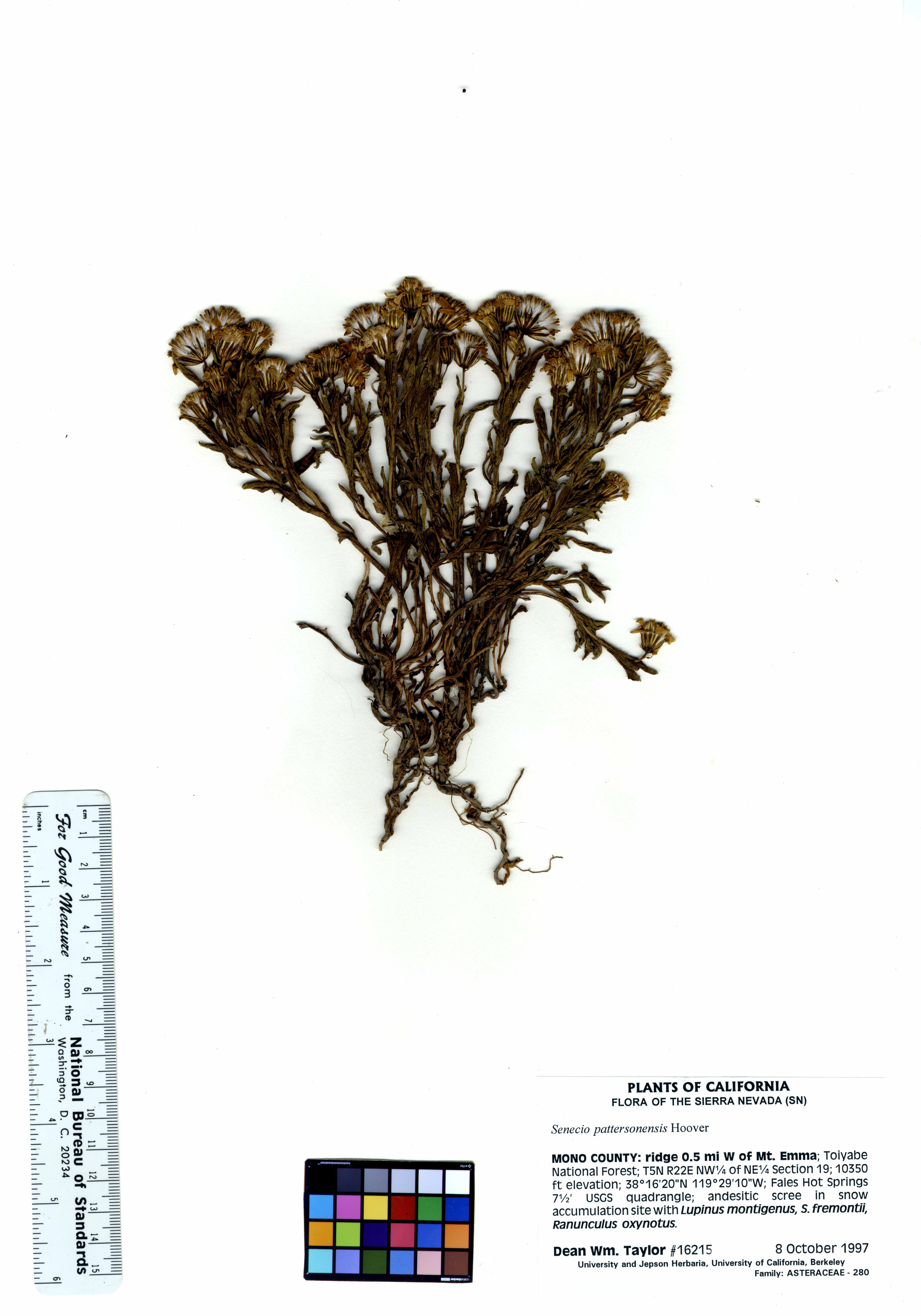
- Senecio pattersonensis specimen

Conservation status
- Imperiled (NatureServe)

Scientific classification
- Kingdom: Plantae
- Clade: Tracheophytes
- Clade: Angiosperms
- Clade: Eudicots
- Clade: Asterids
- Order: Asterales
- Family: Asteraceae
- Genus: Senecio
- Species: S. pattersonensis

Binomial name
- Senecio pattersonensis Hoover

= Senecio pattersonensis =

Species of flowering plant

Senecio pattersonensis is an uncommon species of flowering plant in the aster family known by the common names Mono ragwort. and Mount Patterson senecio.

== Distribution ==
It is endemic to eastern California in Mono County, in a small area of the Eastern High Sierra Nevada peaks at elevations of 3,000–3,700 metres (9,800–12,100 ft). It grows in rocky high mountain habitat in an alpine climate, such as talus and fellfields.

It is named for Mount Patterson, the highest peak in the rugged Sweetwater Mountains subrange of the Sierra Nevada, in Mono County.

== Description ==
Senecio pattersonensis is a small perennial herb producing one to three stems from a rhizome, the plant generally not exceeding ten centimeters in height.

The herbage is hairless and green to red in color. The leaves are thick and often fleshy, measuring 2 to 4 centimeters long. They are narrow and linear or lance-shaped, sometimes with wavy edges or divisions into lobes.

The inflorescence bears one to four flower heads containing yellow disc florets and usually 8 ray florets measuring one half to one centimeter in length. It blooms from July to August.
