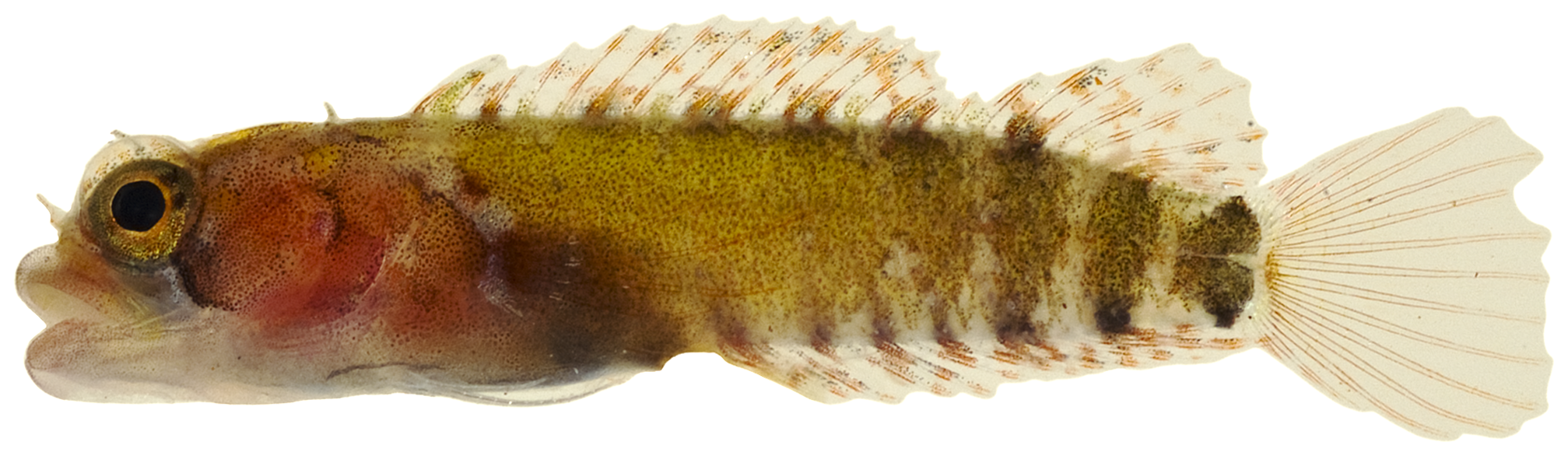

Scientific classification
- Kingdom: Animalia
- Phylum: Chordata
- Class: Actinopterygii
- Order: Blenniiformes
- Family: Blenniidae
- Subfamily: Salariinae
- Genus: Alloblennius; Smith-Vaniz & V. G. Springer, 1971

Type species
- Rhabdoblennius pictus Lotan, 1970

Species
- See text.

= Alloblennius =

Genus of fishes

Alloblennius is a genus of combtooth blennies (family Blenniidae) found in the western and northeastern Indian Ocean.

== Species ==
There are currently five recognized species in this genus:

- Alloblennius anuchalis (V. G. Springer & Spreitzer, 1978)
- Alloblennius frondiculus Smith-Vaniz & G. R. Allen, 2012
- Alloblennius jugularis (Klunzinger, 1871) (Jugular blenny)
- Alloblennius parvus (V. G. Springer & Spreitzer, 1978) (Dwarf blenny)
- Alloblennius pictus (Lotan, 1969)
