= Alloblennius pictus =

Conservation status
- Least Concern (IUCN 3.1)

Scientific classification
- Kingdom: Animalia
- Phylum: Chordata
- Class: Actinopterygii
- Division: Teleostei
- Order: Blenniiformes
- Family: Blenniidae
- Genus: Alloblennius
- Species: A. pictus

Binomial name
- Alloblennius pictus (Lotan, 1969)

Synonyms
- Rhabdoblennius pictus Lotan, 1969

Species of fish

Alloblennius pictus is a species of combtooth blenny (family Blenniidae). Lotan originally placed this species in the genus Rhabdoblennius. It is found in the northwestern Indian Ocean. Blennies in this species are oviparous. They can reach a maximum standard length of 2.6 centimetres (1.02 inches).
