= Mount Patterson (California) =

Mountain in California, United States

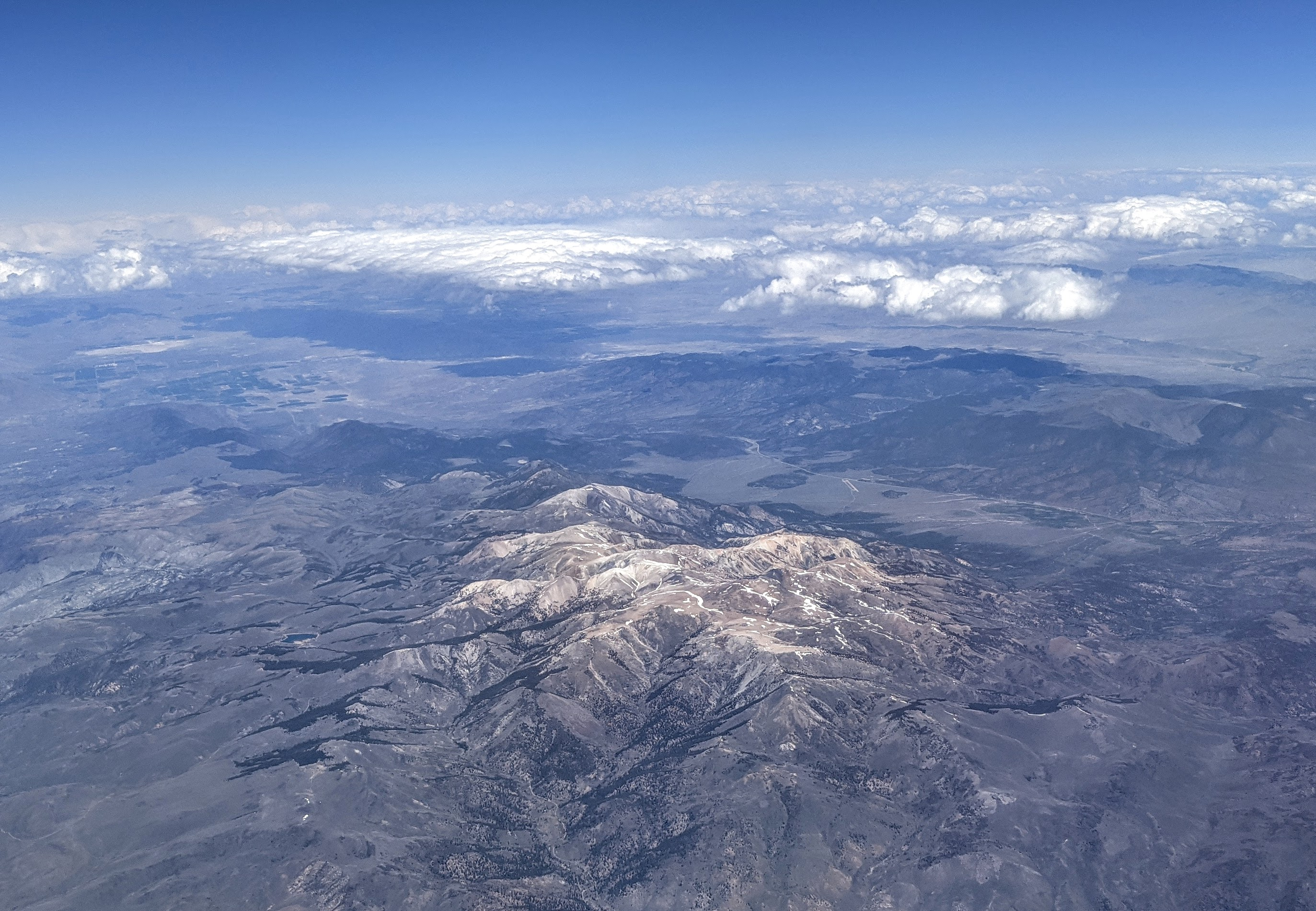
- Mount Patterson from the southwest

Highest point
- Elevation: 11,654 feet (3,552 m)
- Prominence: 4,193 ft (1,278 m)
- Coordinates: 38°26′12″N 119°18′19″W

Geography
- Location within California
- Location: Mono County, California
- Parent range: Sweetwater Mountains

Geology
- Rock age: Uncertain
- Mountain type: Rhyolitic volcano
- Volcanic arc: Sweetwater Mountains, Sierra Nevada

Mount Patterson is a mountain peak located in Mono County, California.

The summit is 11,654 feet (3,552 m) in elevation making it the highest mountain in the Sweetwater Mountains.

== Climate ==
There is no weather station at the summit, but this climate table contains interpolated data for an area around the summit. The peak of Mount Patterson has an Alpine climate (ET).

Climate data for Mount Patterson 38.4189 N, 119.2930 W, Elevation: 11,411 ft (3,478 m) (1991–2020 normals)
Month	Jan	Feb	Mar	Apr	May	Jun	Jul	Aug	Sep	Oct	Nov	Dec	Year
Mean daily maximum °F (°C)	30.5 (−0.8)	29.2 (−1.6)	31.6 (−0.2)	36.0 (2.2)	44.1 (6.7)	54.3 (12.4)	62.9 (17.2)	62.3 (16.8)	56.2 (13.4)	46.7 (8.2)	36.4 (2.4)	30.4 (−0.9)	43.4 (6.3)
Daily mean °F (°C)	21.4 (−5.9)	19.4 (−7.0)	21.4 (−5.9)	24.6 (−4.1)	32.0 (0.0)	41.3 (5.2)	49.1 (9.5)	48.4 (9.1)	42.7 (5.9)	34.6 (1.4)	26.7 (−2.9)	21.4 (−5.9)	31.9 (0.0)
Mean daily minimum °F (°C)	12.2 (−11.0)	9.6 (−12.4)	11.3 (−11.5)	13.2 (−10.4)	20.0 (−6.7)	28.2 (−2.1)	35.3 (1.8)	34.5 (1.4)	29.3 (−1.5)	22.5 (−5.3)	17.0 (−8.3)	12.4 (−10.9)	20.5 (−6.4)
Average precipitation inches (mm)	8.88 (226)	7.43 (189)	6.50 (165)	3.53 (90)	2.12 (54)	0.66 (17)	0.71 (18)	0.72 (18)	0.59 (15)	2.25 (57)	3.27 (83)	7.27 (185)	43.93 (1,117)
Source: PRISM Climate Group

== See also ==
- Sweetwater Mountains
