= East Sister (Nevada) =

Mountain in Nevada, United States

- Location within Nevada

Highest point
- Elevation: 10,410 ft (3,173 m) NAVD 88
- Prominence: 724 ft (221 m)
- Coordinates: 38°31′24″N 119°17′25″W

Geography
- Location: Lyon County, Nevada, U.S.
- Parent range: Sweetwater Mountains
- Topo map: USGS DESERT CREEK PEAK

East Sister is the highest independent mountain located completely within Lyon County in Nevada, United States. It is located within the Sweetwater Mountains just a short distance north of the highest point in Lyon County on the northeast ridge of Middle Sister. The peak is within the Humboldt-Toiyabe National Forest.

The terrain around East Sister is mostly hilly, but to the south it is mountainous. Middle Sister, located south of East Sister, is marked at 10,854 ft (3,308 m) on a 2014 Nevada Department of Transportation map. There are fewer than 2 people per square mile (2.1 km) around East Sister. The nearest larger town is Walker, 10 mi (16.3 km) west of East Sister. The area around East Sister is mostly grassland.
