= Onge language =

Ongan language of Little Andaman Island

Onge
- Önge ॳङे
- Pronunciation: [ˈəŋɡe]
- Native to: India
- Region: South Andaman Islands, Dugong Creek and South Bay islands.
- Ethnicity: 101 Onge people (2011 census)
- Native speakers: 94, 93% of ethnic population (2006); Mainly monolingual. Speakers reserved toward outsiders.
- Language family: Ongan: Onge

Language codes
- ISO 639-3: oon
- Glottolog: onge1236
- ELP: Önge

The Onge language, (also rendered Önge or Ongee, Eng, Ung ॳङे IPA: [ˈəŋɡe]), is one of two known Ongan languages, spoken on the Andaman Islands in India. It is spoken by the Onge people on Little Andaman Island.

== Status ==
Onge used to be spoken throughout Little Andaman as well as in smaller islands to the north, and possibly in the southern tip of South Andaman Island. Since the middle of the 19th century, with British colonization and the massive inflow of Indian settlers from the mainland, the number of Onge speakers has steadily declined, although a moderate increase has been observed in recent years. Currently, there are only 94 native speakers of Onge, confined to a single settlement in the northeast of Little Andaman island (see map below). It is an endangered language.

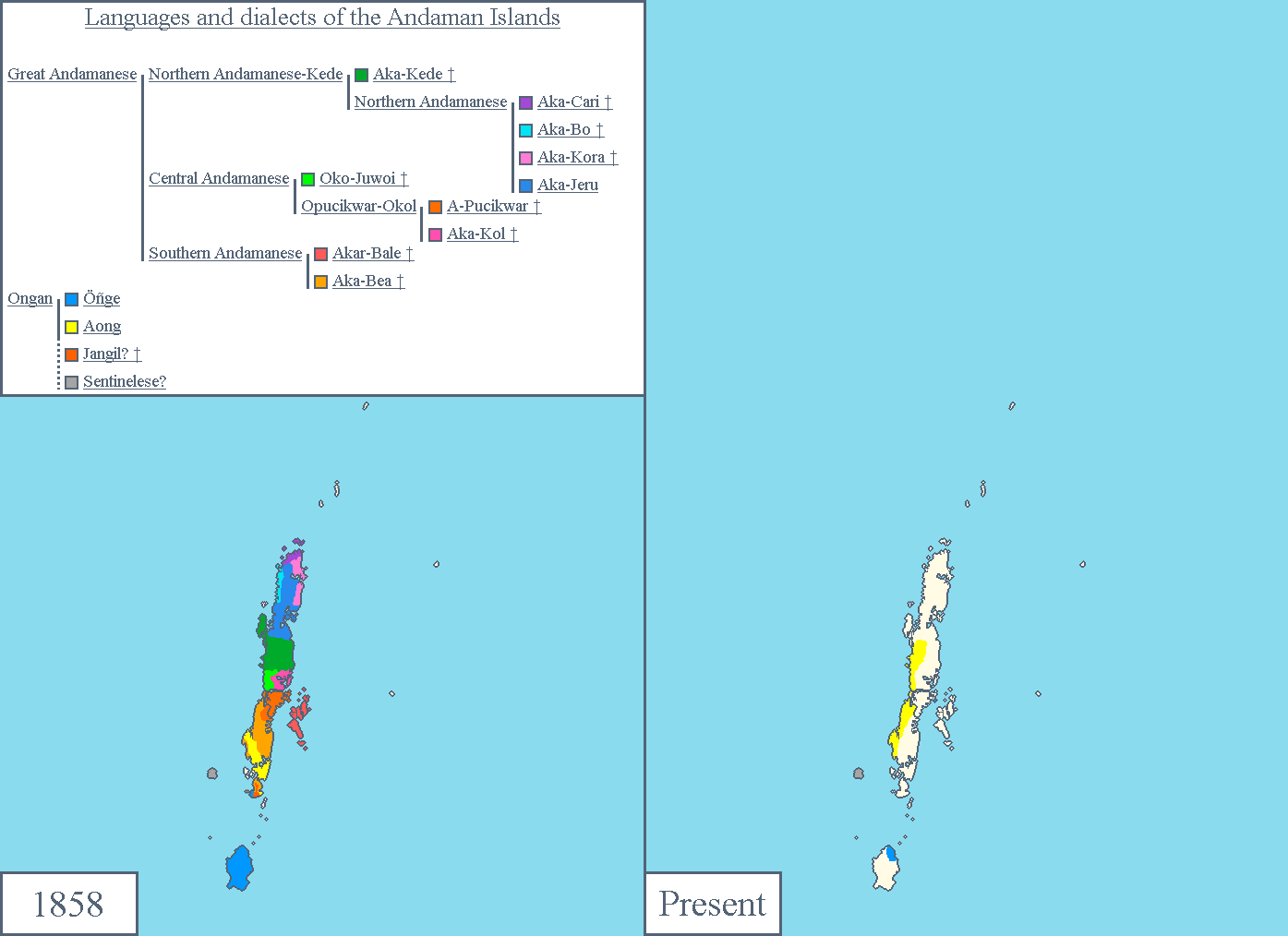
The distributions of different Andamanese peoples, languages, and dialects at the time of British contact compared to the present-day. Onge areas are in blue; south of the islands.

== Phonology ==
=== Consonants ===
		Labial	Coronal	Palatal	Velar	Glottal
Plosive	voiceless	kʷ	t	c	k	(ʔ)
Plosive	voiced	b	d	ɟ	ɡ	
Nasal		m	n	ɲ	ŋ	
Approximant		w	l (/r/)	j		

- /ʔ/? (cf. Blevins (2007:161))
- Blevins (2007:160-161) states that /c, ɟ/ are actually affricates, and that retroflexes may or may not be phonemic.
- /kʷ/ delabializes to /k/ before /u, o/.
- Phonemic /d/ surfaces as [r] intervocalically, while arguably some words have phonemic /r/ which alternates with surface [r, l, j].

=== Vowels ===
	Front	Central	Back
High	i		u
Mid	e	ə	o
Low		a	

There is some vowel harmony: 1p pl. prefix et- becomes [ot-] when the vowel in the next syllable is /u/, e.g. et-eɟale 'our faces' but ot-oticule 'our heads'.

=== Phonotactics ===
Words may be monosyllabic or longer, even in content words (unlike in the closely related Jarawa). Words may begin with consonants or vowels, and maximal syllables are of the form CVC. All Onge words end in vowels, except for imperatives, e.g. kaʔ 'give'.

Consonant-final stems in Jarawa often have cognates with final e in Onge, e.g. Jarawa iŋ, Onge iŋe 'water'; Jarawa inen, Onge inene 'foreigner'; Jarawa dag, Onge dage 'coconut'. Historically these vowels must have been excrescent, as nonetymological word-final e doesn't surface when number markers are suffixed, and the definite article (-gi after etymological consonants, -i after etymological vowels, due to lenition) appears as -i after etymological e but as -gi after excrescent e, e.g. daŋe → daŋe-gi 'tree; dugout'; kue → kue-i 'pig'.

NC clusters sometimes optionally reduce to single C, e.g. iɲɟo-~iɟo- 'to drink' (cf. Jarawa -iɲɟo).

Voiced obstruents may optionally nasalize in syllable onset when the coda is nasal, e.g. bone/mone 'resin, resin torch' (cf. Jarawa pone 'resin, resin torch').

=== Morphophonemics ===
Clusters across morpheme boundaries simplify to homorganic sequences, including geminates, which may occur after word final -e drops, e.g. daŋe 'tree, dugout canoe' → dandena 'two canoes'; umuge 'pigeon' → umulle 'pigeons'.

== Bibliography ==
- Blevins, Juliette (2007), "A Long Lost Sister of Proto-Austronesian? Proto-Ongan, Mother of Jarawa and Onge of the Andaman Islands", Oceanic Linguistics, 46 (1): 154–198, doi:10.1353/ol.2007.0015, S2CID 143141296
