= Alloblennius frondiculus =

Conservation status
- Data Deficient (IUCN 3.1)

Scientific classification
- Kingdom: Animalia
- Phylum: Chordata
- Class: Actinopterygii
- Division: Teleostei
- Order: Blenniiformes
- Family: Blenniidae
- Genus: Alloblennius
- Species: A. frondiculus

Binomial name
- Alloblennius frondiculus Smith-Vaniz & G. R. Allen, 2012

Species of fish

Alloblennius frondiculus is a species of combtooth blenny (family Blenniidae) in the genus Alloblennius.

== Etymology ==
The species epithet "frondiculus" is treated as an appositional noun, and is Latin for "a small leaf", referring to the shape of the orbital cirrus.

== Distribution ==
A. frondiculus was described from a single female specimen, collected from the waters off the southwest shore of South Cinque Island, one of the Andaman Islands in the Indian Ocean. It was discovered near a coastal shore at approximately 3 metres (10 feet) below sea level. A. frondiculus is the only member of the genus which is not found in the western Indian Ocean or the Red Sea.

== Description ==
The holotypic female A. frondiculus specimen measured 23.8 mm in standard length. Its body was olive in colour, becoming white around the stomach, and also bore six brown stripes on either side. It possessed yellow irises with reddish-orange lines stemming from the pupils. While most species of Alloblennius possess short, minute supraorbital cirri, the cirrus is large and prominent on A. frondiculus.
