= South Brother Island (Andaman Islands) =

Uninhabited Island in Indian Ocean

Coordinates: 10.933°N 92.613°E

South Brother Island is an uninhabited island in the Indian Ocean, part of the Andaman Archipelago. It is located in the Duncan Passage, about 9.5 kilometre northeast of Little Andaman Island. It is part of the South Andaman district of the Andaman and Nicobar Islands, a Union Territory of India.

The island is roughly bean-shaped, about 1800 m by 630 m, with a broad bay on the north side. It is almost flat, thickly wooded, fringed by a narrow beach and surrounded by a reefs. The central part is depressed and becomes a lake in the rainy season. The island hosts a 1.24 km^{2} wildlife sanctuary, established 1987.

By the end of the 19th century, the island was occasionally visited by the Onge of Little Andaman to catch sea turtles; one explorer reports finding huts "with neat charpoys of bamboos" capable of holding 30 people. The island seemed to be their limit in disputes with the Great Andamanese. It has been conjectured to be part of the route for the Onge expansion into south Great Andaman Island in the wake of the Great Andamanese tribes, around 1890 to 1930.

== See also ==
- North Brother Island, India
