= Alloblennius anuchalis =

Conservation status
- Least Concern (IUCN 3.1)

Scientific classification
- Kingdom: Animalia
- Phylum: Chordata
- Class: Actinopterygii
- Division: Teleostei
- Order: Blenniiformes
- Family: Blenniidae
- Genus: Alloblennius
- Species: A. anuchalis

Binomial name
- Alloblennius anuchalis (V. G. Springer & Spreitzer, 1978)

Synonyms
- Antennablennius anuchalis Springer & Spreitzer, 1978

Species of fish

Alloblennius anuchalis is a species of combtooth blenny (family Blenniidae) in the genus Alloblennius. It is a tropical blenny found in the western Indian Ocean, around Mauritius and Oman. Males can reach a maximum standard length of 2.4 centimetres (0.91 inches). The species is oviparous.

== Etymology ==
Springer and Spreitzer originally considered the blenny a member of the genus Antennablennius, due to suspicion that Alloblennius was a junior synonym of the genus. The species epithet, treated as an appositional noun, combines the Greek prefix "a" ("without") and the Latin noun "nucha" ("nape") to produce the definition "without nape", referring to the lack of cirri on the nape of the blenny. The authors acknowledged that this was an unusual trait for a member of Antennablennius.
