= Hutbay =

Capital of Little Andaman in India

Hutbay is the capital of Little Andaman, situated beside the Ten Degree Channel, within the Andaman and Nicobar Islands in India. This island is about 120 km from Sri Vijayapuram (Port Blair) by sea.

== Administration ==
There are a number of government offices in the city, such as the Tehsildar office, Zila Parishad. The island's bus-stand is housed here.

== Tourism ==
It contains the second largest palm plantation (dalda plantation) in Asia and largest in India. It has Asia's second highest lighthouse. It houses several tourism destinations, including Kala Paththar, Butler Bay Beach and white surf waterfalls.

== Transport ==
- Pawan Hans Helicopter Service: A government-subsidized helicopter operates a 35-minute flight from Port Blair directly to the Hut Bay Heliport. It costs roughly ₹3,350 per passenger, but seating priority is legally reserved for medical emergencies and local islanders.
- Seaport: The island is reachable by boat from Port Blair, or from Rangat. These operate 4 to 5 times a week from Port Blair's Haddo Wharf or Phoenix Bay Jetty. The voyage takes roughly 7 to 9 hours depending on weather conditions. Tickets must be booked via the Andaman DSS e-ticketing counter. There are private cruise ships such as Makruzz, Green Ocean, Nautika and ITT Majestic.
- Water aerodrome terminal: India has 4 water aerodrome terminals in the Andaman and Nicobar Islands for the civilian seaplane services under the government’s regional connectivity scheme (UDAN), at (listed north to south) Long Island, Swaraj Dweep (formerly Havelock Island), Shaheed Dweep (formerly Neil Island), and Hutbay (Little Andaman).
- Local transport: Once you land at the Hut Bay Jetty, standard commercial ride-hailing apps (like Ola or Uber) do not exist. You must rely on the following localized options.
  - Public Buses: Small government-run local buses ply the main north-south road network. They are highly affordable (fares range between ₹7 and ₹15), but their schedules are infrequent. You can simply wave to the driver from the roadside to board.
  - Shared Jeeps & Auto-Rickshaws: Shared public jeeps run fixed routes connecting the jetty to villages further north (like V.K. Pur). A point-to-point ride costs anywhere from ₹10 to ₹50, while hiring an entire auto-rickshaw or jeep for a private transfer directly to a resort will cost roughly ₹100 to ₹150.
  - Scooter & Motorbike Rentals: This is the most popular way to explore the island's single main highway (SH1). Rentals are available around the Hut Bay Indira Bazar market area or via local guesthouses for approximately ₹300 to ₹500 per day. Fuel stations are highly limited and frequently close before 5:00 PM, so you must plan refuels proactively.

== See also ==
- Tourism in the Andaman and Nicobar Islands
- Tourism in India
