= Jugular blenny =

Conservation status
- Least Concern (IUCN 3.1)

Scientific classification
- Kingdom: Animalia
- Phylum: Chordata
- Class: Actinopterygii
- Division: Teleostei
- Order: Blenniiformes
- Family: Blenniidae
- Genus: Alloblennius
- Species: A. jugularis

Binomial name
- Alloblennius jugularis (Klunzinger, 1871)

Synonyms
- Blennius jugularis Klunzinger, 1871; Glyptoparus jugularis (Klunzinger, 1871)

Species of fish

The jugular blenny (Alloblennius jugularis) is a combtooth blenny (family Blenniidae) found in the western Indian Ocean. Klunzinger originally placed this species in the genus Blennius. It is a tropical, marine and freshwater blenny which is known from the Gulf of Aqaba and the Red Sea, in the western Indian Ocean. Male jugular blennies can reach a maximum standard length of 5 centimetres (1.97 inches). The blennies are oviparous.
