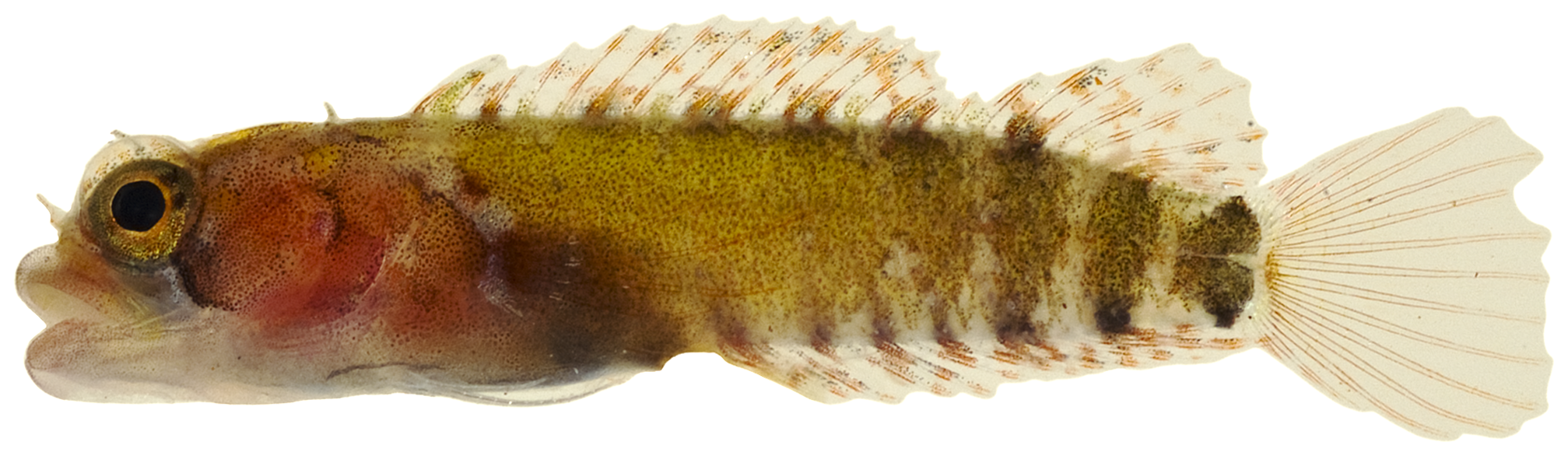

Conservation status
- Least Concern (IUCN 3.1)

Scientific classification
- Kingdom: Animalia
- Phylum: Chordata
- Class: Actinopterygii
- Division: Teleostei
- Order: Blenniiformes
- Family: Blenniidae
- Genus: Alloblennius
- Species: A. parvus

Binomial name
- Alloblennius parvus V. G. Springer & Spreitzer, 1978

= Alloblennius parvus =

Species of fish

Alloblennius parvus, the dwarf blenny, is a combtooth blenny, from the subfamily Salarinae, of the family Blenniidae. It is a tropical blenny which is known from the western Indian Ocean, and has been recorded swimming at a depth range of 6–10 metres. Dwarf blennies have pale bodies with a dark spot between their first and second dorsal spines. Males have a dark colouring beneath their heads and around their pectoral fins, and can reach a maximum standard length of 2.6 centimetres (1.02 inches). The blennies are oviparous.

== Etymology ==
The species epithet "parvus" (Latin: "little") refers to the size of the species, from which the common name is also derived.
