= Sweetwater Mountains =

Mountain range in California and Nevada, US

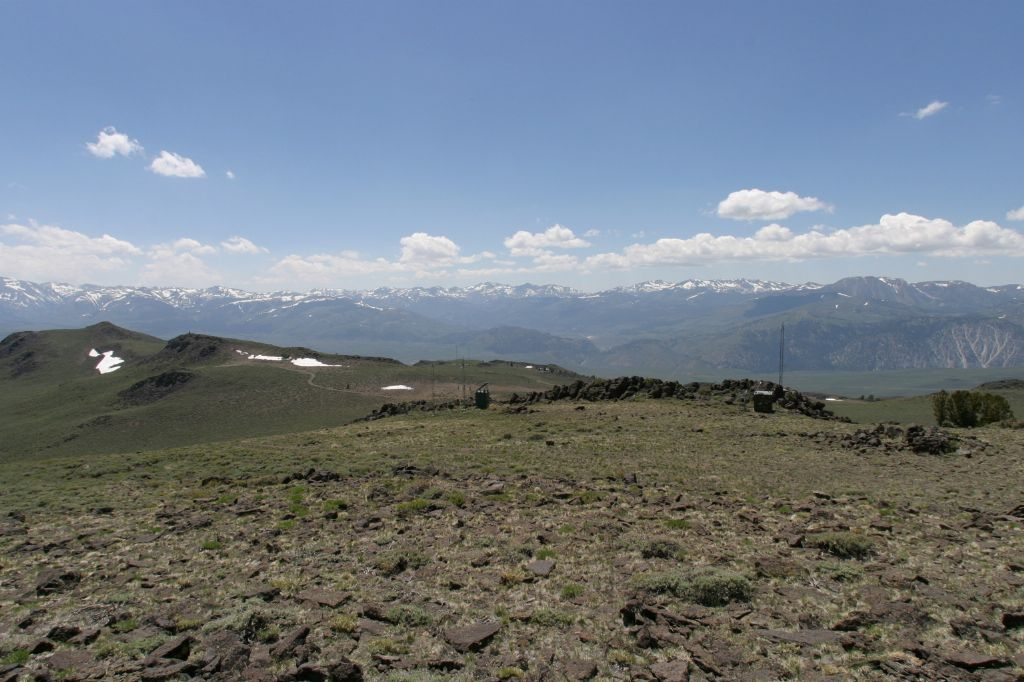
- Sweetwater Mountains, looking West toward Sonora Pass

Highest point
- Peak: Mount Patterson
- Elevation: 11,673 ft (3,558 m)
- Coordinates: 38°26′10″N 119°18′20″W

Geography
- Location within California
- Country: United States
- States: California and Nevada
- Counties: Mono County and Lyon County
- Range coordinates: 38°26′N 119°18′W
- Topo map: USGS Mount Patterson

Geology
- Rock types: igneous and volcanic

The Sweetwater Mountains (highest peak: Mount Patterson 11,654 feet (3,552 m)) are a small mountain range in northern Mono County, California and western Lyon County, Nevada, separating the West Walker River from the East Walker River. Most of the range is only accessible by four wheel drive vehicle, on foot, or pack animal. Most of the range is contained in the Toiyabe National Forest. The place name appears on the 1874 California Geologic Survey map of California and Nevada.

The ghost towns of Belfort and Clinton are small gold mining camps on the southeastern slope of Mt. Patterson. The Sweetwater post office existed on the eastern boundary of the range in the 1920s. The Fales post office existed on the southwestern boundary in 1877. Both Clinton and Belfort had post offices in the 1880s. There are several other inactive small gold mining camps and gold mines in the range, including Boulder Flat, Montague Mine, Angelo Mission Mine, Kentuck Mine, Frederick Mine, Longstreet Mine, Lilly Mine, Deep Creek Mine, and Tiger Mine. The area roughly forming a SE quadrant from the summit of Mt Patterson, bounded by Sweetwater Canyon (easterly line) and Frying Pan Canyon (southerly line), is known as the Patterson Mining District of Mono County according to the 1888 report of the State of California Mineralogist. The 1888 report also records the Cameron mining camp, which is now unknown. At least one mining company issued stock: Monte Cristo Consolidated Mining Company, 100,000 shares issued in 1887 at $10 each.

The Sweetwater Mountains geology largely consists of a pluton surrounded by volcanic flow from the Little Walker Caldera. Mt. Patterson is a volcano of uncertain age which is capped with white rhyolite.

Besides Mount Patterson, other peaks in the Sweetwater Range include Middle Sister and East Sister.
