= Onge =

Ethnic group of Andaman Islands

ॳङे (Öñge)
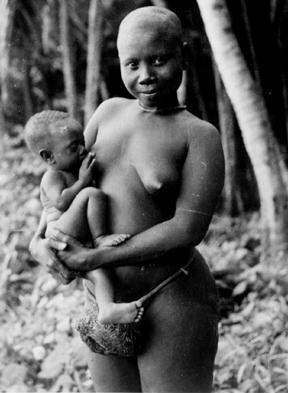
- A young Onge mother with her baby

Total population
- 101 (2011 census)

Regions with significant populations
- India specifically Little Andaman Island

Languages
- Önge, one of the Ongan languages

Religion
- traditional folk religion (Animism)

Related ethnic groups
- other Andamanese peoples, especially Jarawa

The Onge (also Önge, Ongee, and Öñge) are an Andamanese ethnic group, indigenous to the Andaman Islands in Southeast Asia at the Bay of Bengal, India. They are traditionally hunter-gatherers and fishers, but also practice plant cultivation. They are designated as a Scheduled Tribe of India.

== History ==
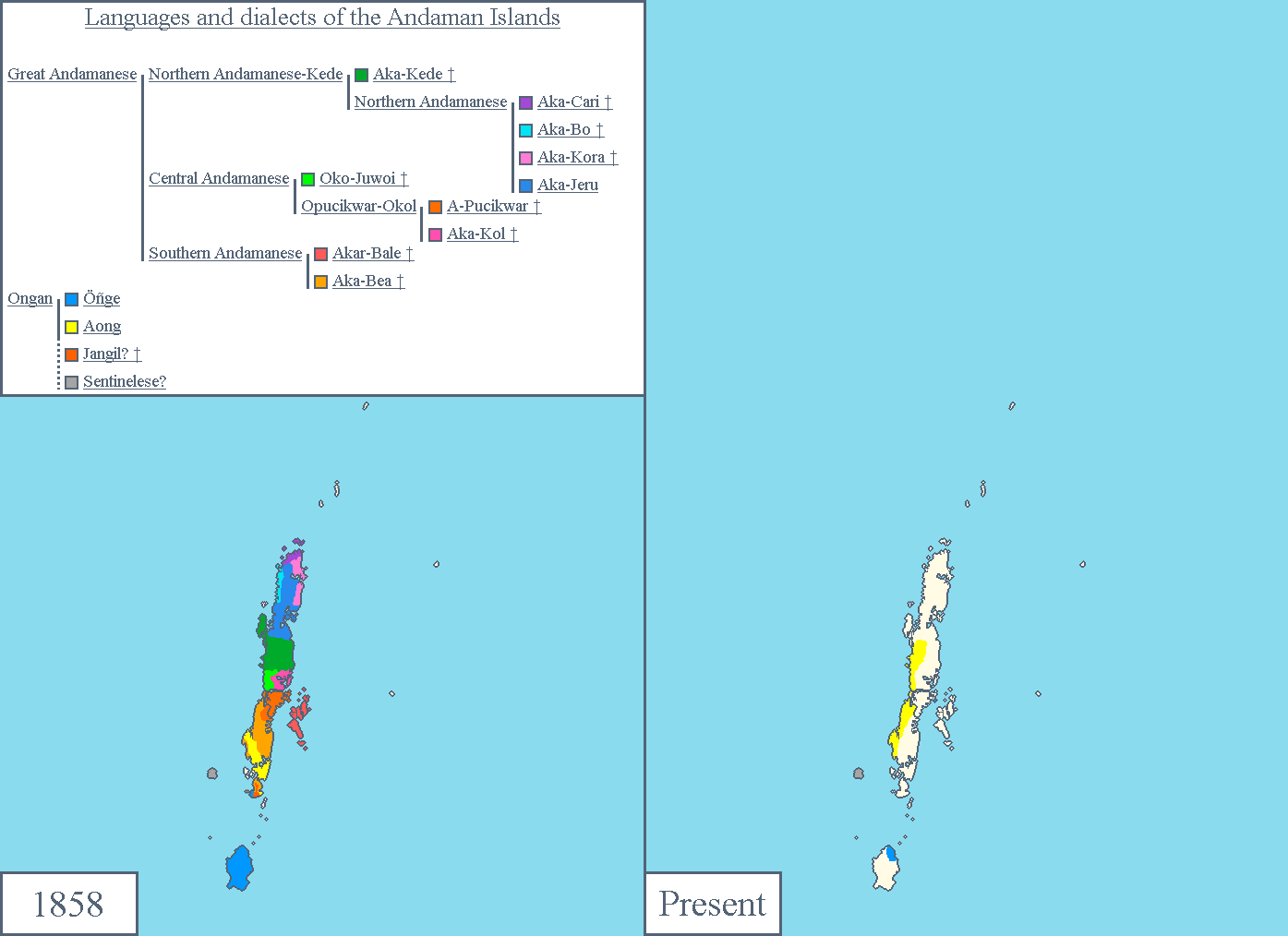
The distributions of different Andamanese peoples, languages, and dialects at the time of British contact compared to the present-day.

In the 18th century the Onge were distributed across Little Andaman Island and the nearby islands, with some territory and camps established on Rutland Island and the southern tip of South Andaman Island. After they encountered British colonial officers, friendly relations were established with the British Empire in the 1800s through Lieutenant Archibald Blair. Originally restive, they were pacified by M. V. Portman in the 1890s. British naval officer M. V. Portman described them as the "mildest, most timid, and inoffensive" group of Andamanese people he had encountered. By the end of the 19th century they sometimes visited the South and North Brother Islands to catch sea turtles; at the time, those islands seemed to be the boundary between their territory and the range of the Great Andamanese people further north. Today, the surviving members are confined to two reserve camps on Little Andaman: Dugong Creek in the northeast, and South Bay.

The Onge were semi-nomadic and fully dependent on hunting and gathering for food.

The Onge are one of the aboriginal peoples (adivasi) of India. Together with the other Andamanese tribes and a few other isolated groups elsewhere in Oceania, they comprise the Negrito peoples.

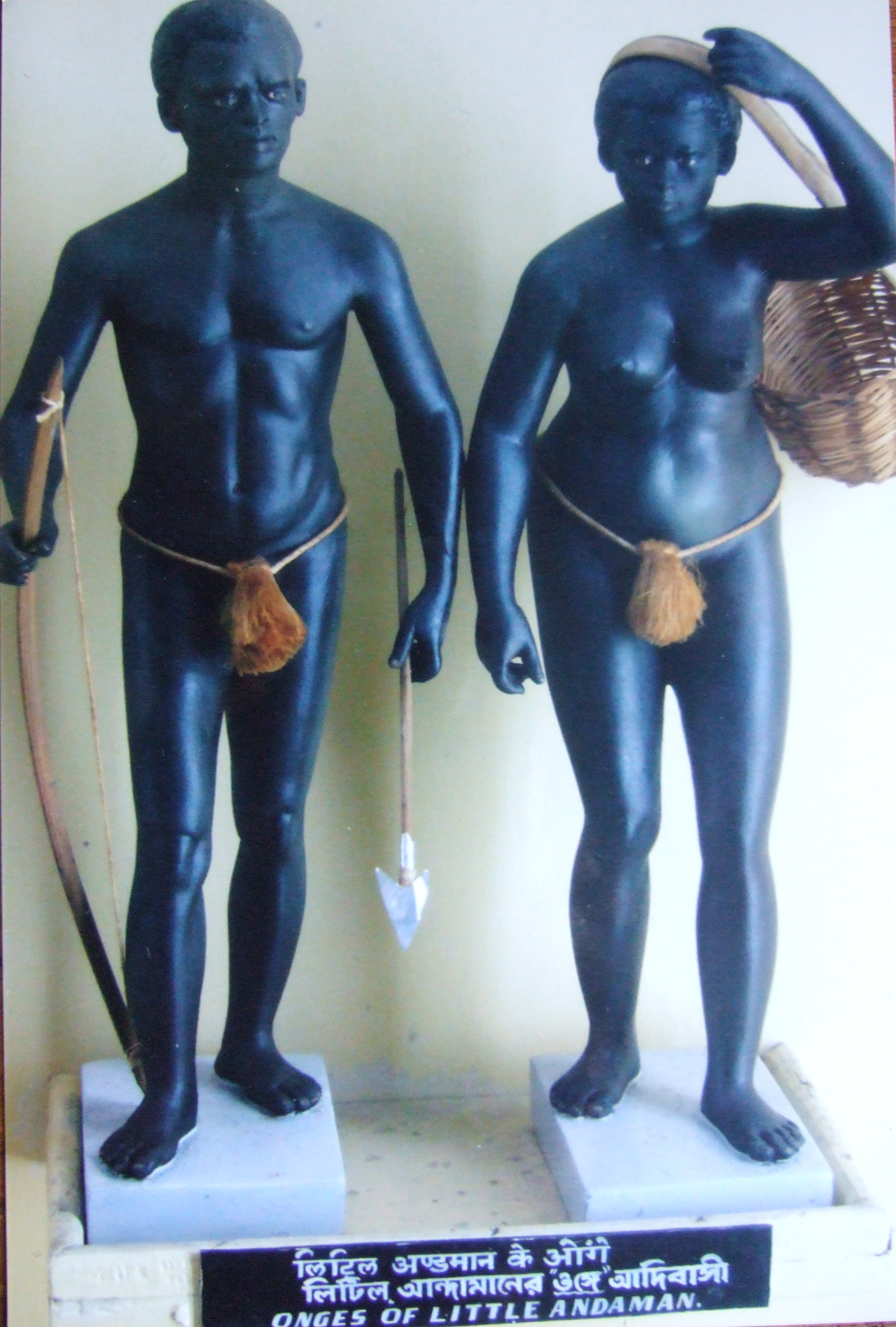
A depiction of Onge people in Kolkata Museum

=== Population ===
Onge population numbers were substantially reduced in the aftermath of colonisation and settlement, from 672 in 1901 to barely 100. The population is still maintaining their cultural and biological identity, and it appears that total numbers have increased from 100 to 117 in 2017.

A major cause of the decline in Onge population is the changes in their food habits brought about by their contact with the outside world. The Onge are also one of the least fertile people in the world. About 40% of the married couples are sterile. Onge women rarely become pregnant before the age of 28. Infant and child mortality is in the range of 40%. The Onge's net reproductive index is 0.91. The net reproductive index among the Great Andamanese is 1.40.

In 1901, there were 672 Onge; 631 in 1911, 346 in 1921, 250 in 1931, and 150 in 1951.

=== Tsunami surviving tactics ===
The semi-nomadic Onge have traditional stories that tell of the ground shaking and a great wall of water destroying the land. Taking heed of this story, the Onge survived the tsunami catastrophe caused by the 2004 Indian Ocean earthquake by taking shelter in the highlands.

=== Poisoning incident ===
In December 2008, eight male tribal members died after drinking a toxic liquid – identified as methanol by some sources – that they had apparently mistaken for drinking alcohol. The liquid apparently came from a container that had washed ashore at Dugong Creek near their settlement on the island, but Port Blair authorities ordered an investigation into whether it had originated elsewhere. A further 15 Onge were taken to hospital with at least one critically ill.

With their population estimated at only around 100 before the incident, the director of Survival International described the mass poisoning as a "calamity for the Onge", and warned that any more deaths could "put the survival of the entire tribe in serious danger". Bhopinder Singh, the Lieutenant Governor of the Andaman Islands, ordered an inquiry into the incident.

== Culture and religion ==
The native Andamanese religion and belief system is a form of animism. Ancestor worship is an important element in the religious traditions of the Andaman islands. The Andamanese probably had no government or clan leader, but made decisions by group consensus.

== Language ==
The Onge speak the Önge language. It is one of two known Ongan languages (southern Andamanese languages). Önge used to be spoken throughout Little Andaman as well as in smaller islands to the north, and possibly in the southern tip of South Andaman island. Since the middle of the 19th century, with the arrival of the British in the Andamans, and, after Indian independence, the massive inflow of Indian settlers from the mainland, the number of Onge speakers has steadily declined. However, a moderate increase has been observed in recent years. As of 2006, there were 94 native Onge speakers confined to a single settlement in the northeast of Little Andaman Island (see map above), making it an endangered language.

The Ongan languages, to which Onge belongs, have been proposed by Juliette Blevins to be related to Mainland Asian languages, such as Austronesian. However, this proposal has not been well received by other linguists, such as Robert Blust, who concludes that the hypothesis is not supported by the comparative method (used in linguistics), and also cites non-linguistic (such as cultural, archaeological, and biological) evidence against Blevins' hypothesis. George van Driem (2011) considers Blevins' evidence as "not compelling", although he leaves the possibility open that some resemblances could be the result of contact/borrowing, a position also held by Hoogervorst (2012).

== Genetics ==
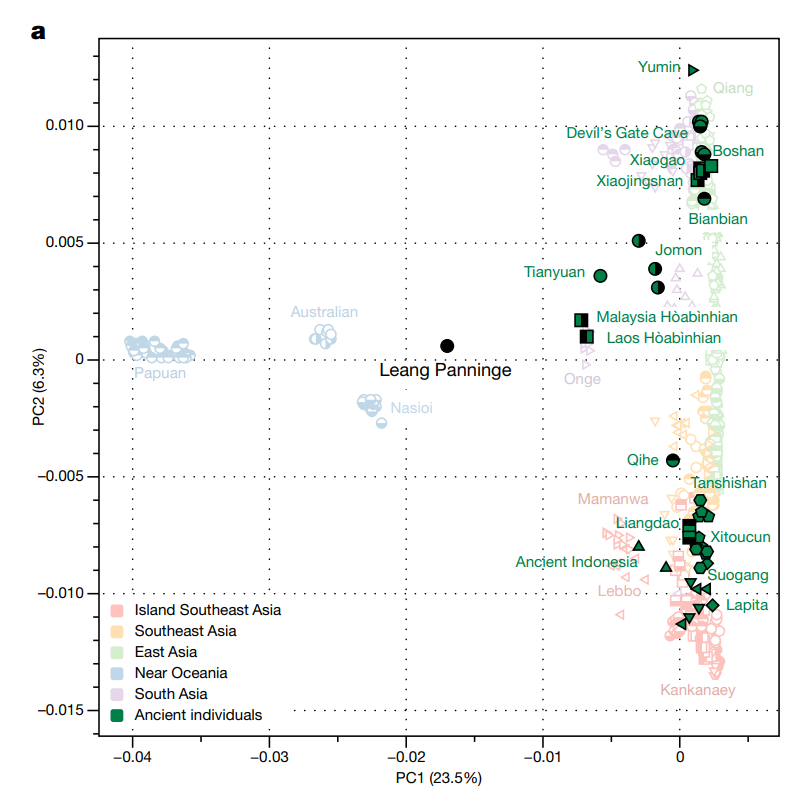
PCA calculated on present-day and ancient individuals from eastern Eurasia and Oceania. PC1 (23,8%) distinguishes East-Eurasians and Australo-Melanesians, while PC2 (6,3%) differentiates East-Eurasians along a North to South cline.

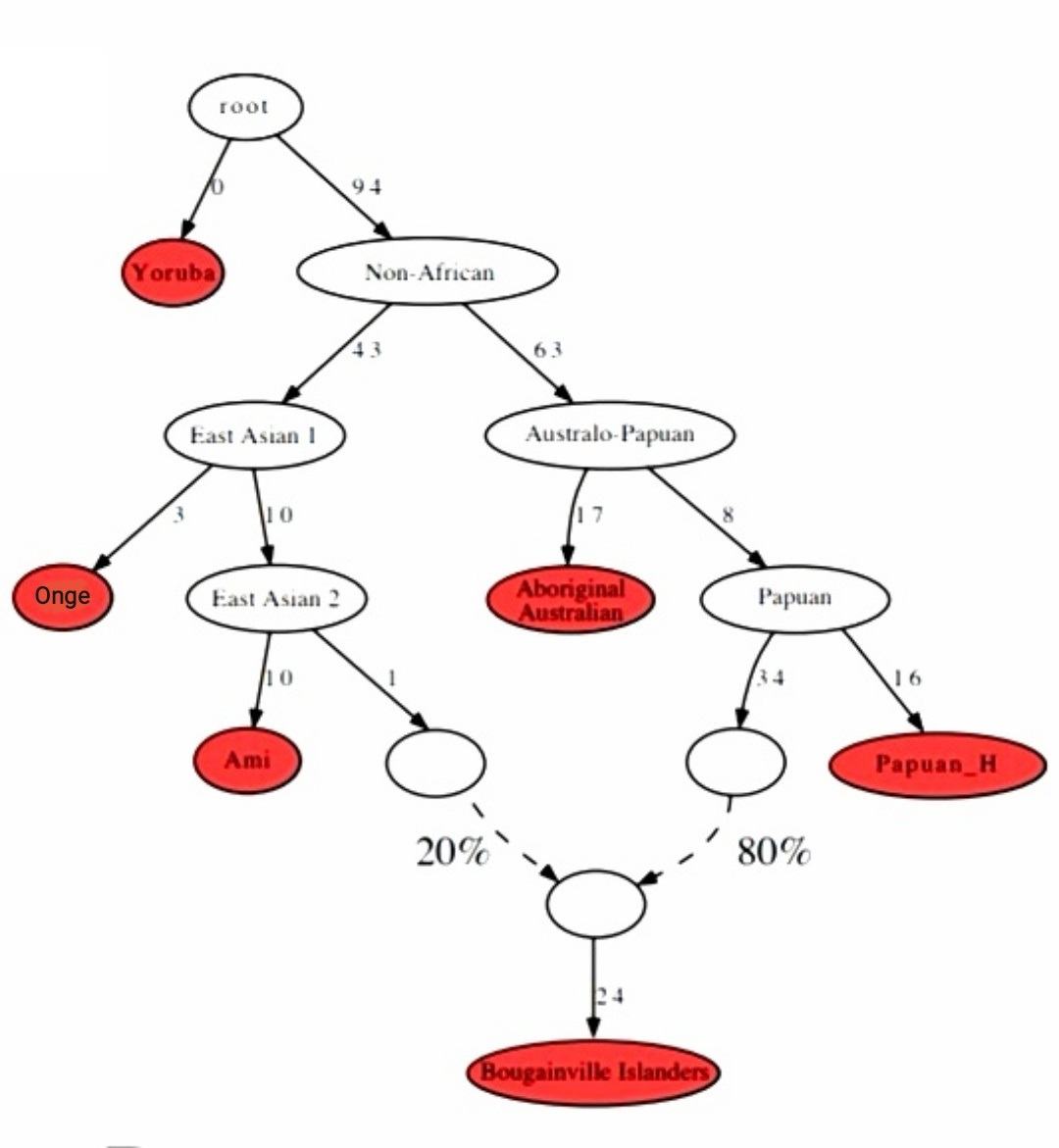
Genetic population tree of "eastern non-African" populations.

Genetically, the Onge, as well as other Andamanese people, are distantly related to East Asian people. The Andamanese Onge show the highest affinity towards some Southeast Asian Negrito ethnic groups, such as the Aeta people, but also ancient remains of Hoabinhians, which are all characterized by Basal East Asian ancestry. It was found that Andamanese (Onge) split from the common ancestor of modern day East Asians between 50,000 BC and 25,000 BC, before becoming isolated on the Andaman Islands. The Andamanese (Onge) as well as East Asians, are also distantly related to Ancient Ancestral South Indians, a proposed ancient indigenous lineage of South Asia. Recent genetic evidence suggest that a Basal East Asian population (close or ancestral to Andamanese and East Asians) was widespread in Asia. Onge are also closely related to Papuans and Aboriginal Australians but differ due to higher Denisovan input found in the latter two.

Overall, despite their affinities, there was a simultaneous split between the Onge, Mainland Asian (including Han, Indigenous Taiwanese and Thai) and Near Oceanian (including Aboriginal Australians and Melanesians) lineages after the initial eastward migration of an ancient eastern lineage, from a hub in the Iranian Plateau. Other studies, however, suggest that the Onge briefly shared genetic drift with the ancestors of Tianyuan-related populations before diverging. Groups like Papuans were also believed to have diverged from other East Eurasians before Tianyuan-related populations. Genetic differences between them and Tianyuan-related populations were likewise attributed to archaic hominin admixture.According to a 2023 study, Great Andamanese are found to be ancestral to the Onge and Jarawa groups.

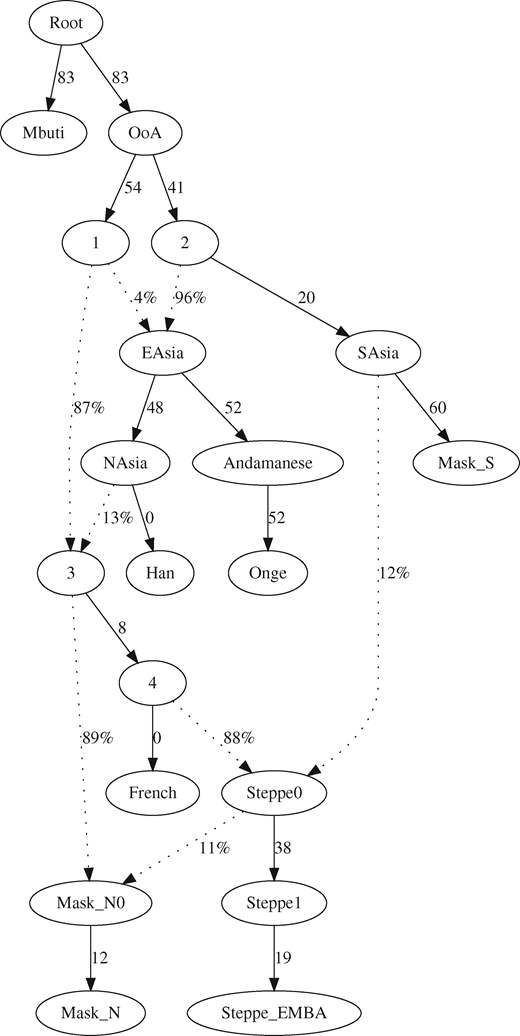
Genetic population tree of Eurasian populations.

A study by Reich et al. (2009) found that while the Onge are distantly related to modern South Asians, they have none of the admixture from Neolithic Iranian farmers or steppe pastoralists which is widespread on the mainland. From this, they conclude that the Onge are solely descended from one of the ancient populations which contributed to the genetics of modern Indians. According to Chaubey and Endicott (2013), overall, the Andamanese are more closely related to Southeast Asians and East Asians than they are to present-day South Asians. According to Yelmen et al. 2019, the non-West Eurasian part extracted from South Asian samples, especially from certain South Indian tribal groups, are a better proxy for Ancient Ancestral South Asian (AASI) ancestry than the Andamanese Onge are. There is also evidence of deep divergence between the AASI lineage and the ancestry found in present Onge.

The Onge's physical similarities with indigenous African groups are reflective of adaptation to tropical rainforests and convergent evolution rather than shared ancestry.

The Onge population is consistently declining and infant mortality rate is very high. Several physiological parameters such as ABO, Rh blood group, blood pressure, SGOT, SGPT and total protein level, hepatitis B surface antigen, VDRL and some genetic markers have been studied. The results of blood pressure, cholesterol level and liver enzyme test do not show any abnormality. However, the incidence of HBsAg is found to be very high that might have affected their fertility.

Analysis of paternal lineages indicates that all Onge carry the Y-DNA Haplogroup D, widespread in East Asia and less in Central Asia. Maternally, the Onge also exclusively belong to the M clade, bearing the M2 and M4 subclades, commonly found in Asia.

The immunoglobulin levels (G, M and A) have been studied and found to be quite high compare to other Indian and world populations. The increase level of immunoglobulins in the Onge might have resulted to frequent exposure to different kind of infections and diseases.
