= South Cinque Island =

Nickname: Ga-o-ta-koi
- Location within Andaman and Nicobar Islands

Geography
- Location: Bay of Bengal
- Coordinates: 11.27°N 92.70°E
- Archipelago: Andaman Islands
- Adjacent to: Indian Ocean
- Total islands: 1
- Major islands: South Cinque Island
- Area: 4.557 km^{2} (1.759 sq mi)
- Length: 5.5 km (3.42 mi)
- Width: 1.5 km (0.93 mi)
- Coastline: 14 km (8.7 mi)
- Highest elevation: 166 m (545 ft)

Administration
- India
- District: South Andaman
- Island group: Andaman Islands
- Island sub-group: Cinque Islands
- Tehsil: Port Blair Tehsil

Demographics
- Population: 0 (2011)

Additional information
- Time zone: IST (UTC+5:30)
- PIN: 744202
- Telephone code: 031927
- ISO code: IN-AN-00
- Official website: www.and.nic.in

South Cinque Island or Ga-o-ta-koi is an uninhabited island of the Andaman Islands. It belongs to the South Andaman administrative district, part of the Indian union territory of Andaman and Nicobar Islands. The island lies 41 km (25 mi) south from Port Blair.

== Geography ==
The island belongs to the Cinque Islands of Rutland Archipelago and is located between North Cinque Island (1.5 km (1 mi) to the north) and Passage Island (6.2 km (4 mi) to the south). The passage between South Cinque and North Cinque is called Cinque Strait. South Cinque Island and North Cinque Island, 1.5 km (1 mi) to the north, are sometimes considered to be a single Cinque Island.

== Administration ==
Politically, South Cinque Island is part of Port Blair Taluk.

== Fauna ==
A new species of blenny, Alloblennius frondiculus was found in the surrounding waters.
