= Middle Sister (California) =

- Location within California

Highest point
- Elevation: 10,859 ft (3,310 m) NAVD 88
- Prominence: 854 ft (260 m)
- Listing: Nevada County High Points 11th; Tahoe OGUL Star Peak
- Coordinates: 38°30′29″N 119°17′43″W

Geography
- Location: Mono County, California, U.S.
- Parent range: Sweetwater Mountains
- Topo map: USGS Desert Creek Peak

Climbing
- Easiest route: Scramble, class 2

Middle Sister is a mountain in the Sweetwater Mountains of Mono County, California, United States. It is located within the Humboldt-Toiyabe National Forest. The northeast ridge crosses into Lyon County in Nevada, making that location the Lyon County's highest point at about 10,565 feet (3,220 m).
