= North Cinque Island =

Nickname: Gue-a-lue
- Location within Andaman and Nicobar Islands Location within Bay of Bengal

Geography
- Location: Bay of Bengal
- Coordinates: 11.314°N 92.714°E
- Archipelago: Andaman Islands
- Adjacent to: Indian Ocean
- Area: 1.988 km^{2} (0.768 sq mi)
- Length: 3.6 km (2.24 mi)
- Width: 2 km (1.2 mi)
- Coastline: 12 km (7.5 mi)
- Highest elevation: 154 m (505 ft)

Administration
- India
- District: South Andaman
- Island group: Andaman Islands
- Island sub-group: Cinque Islands
- Tehsil: Port Blair Tehsil
- Largest settlement: North Cinque Island (Wildlife Station)

Demographics
- Population: 0 (2011)

Additional information
- Time zone: IST (UTC+5:30)
- PIN: 744202
- Telephone code: 031927
- ISO code: IN-AN-00
- Official website: www.and.nic.in

North Cinque Island or Gue-a-lue is an uninhabited island of the Andaman Islands. It belongs to the South Andaman administrative district, part of the Indian union territory of Andaman and Nicobar Islands. The island is 37 km (23 mi) south of Port Blair.

== Geography ==
The island belongs to the Cinque Islands of Rutland Archipelago and is located 5.5 km (3 mi) southeast of Rutland Island. The passage between North Cinque and Rutland is called Manners Strait. North Cinque Island and South Cinque Island, 1.5 km (1 mi) to the south, are sometimes considered to be a single Cinque Island. North Cinque consists of three rocky Peninsulas connected by sand bars. The northern peninsula is the largest one, 2.9 km long in the N-S direction and 1.1 km wide; it has two adjacent hills about 154 m and 145 m high. The middle (southernmost) peninsula, 1.05 km across, lies 270 m to the south and has a bare hill 89 m high. About 150 m to its west lies the third and smallest peninsula, an oval knob about 450 m across. The sand bar between the south and north peninsulas was broken through in the 2004 Indian Ocean earthquake and tsunami but has since reformed.

== Administration ==
Politically, North Cinque Island is part of Port Blair Taluk.

== Demographics ==
There was a wildlife station on the island, but it was abandoned after budget cuts at 2011. There is a lighthouse at the top of the tallest hill on the northern part of North Cinque, established 1972, about 2 km from the landing point.

== Fauna ==
The Cinque Islands have been declared a sanctuary as they house an enormous variety of coral reefs, sea weeds, colorful fishes, shells, starfish, sea anemones, salt-water crocodile, turtles and water snakes.

== Tourism ==
The island is a popular destination for underwater diving. It is best known for its coral richness and beach beauty. It was named as one of the most visited locations of Andamans.
