= Duncan Passage =

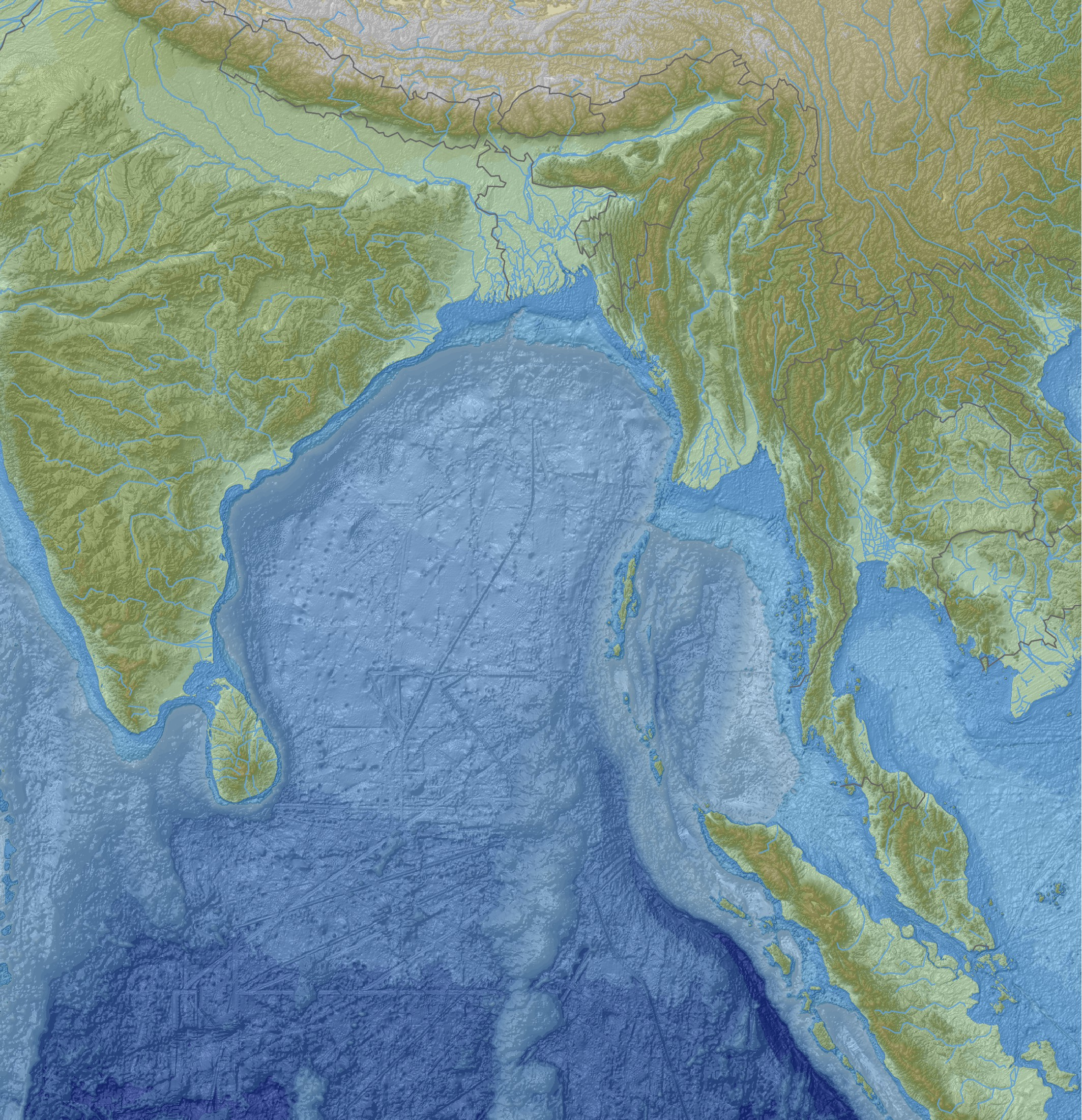
- Location in the Bay of Bengal.
- Coordinates: 11°2′N 92°35′E
- Type: Channel
- Part of: Indian Ocean

Duncan Passage is a strait in the Bay of Bengal. It is about 48 km (30 mi) wide; it separates Rutland Island (part of Great Andaman and South Andaman administrative division) to the north, and Little Andaman to the south. West of Duncan Passage is the Bay of Bengal; east is the Andaman Sea. It lies within the exclusive economic zone of India protected by the integrated tri-services Andaman and Nicobar Command of Indian Military.

It sits between The Sisters island off South Andaman Island and North Brother Island off Little Andaman with a minimum depth of 21.9 m.

Manners Strait is the branch of Duncan Passage that lies between North Cinque Island and Rutland Island.

== Islands along Duncan Passage ==
Several small islands and islets lie along the passage. North to south, they are:

- North Cinque Island
- South Cinque Island
- Passage Island
- The Sisters
- North Brother Island
- South Brother Island

== Nearby major channels and straits ==
=== In Andamans ===
- Coco Channel (or Coco Strait)
- Ten Degree Channel
- Six Degree Channel

=== Outside Andaman ===
- Palk Strait
- Malacca Strait
- Singapore Strait
- Sunda Strait
- Lombok Strait

== Gallery ==
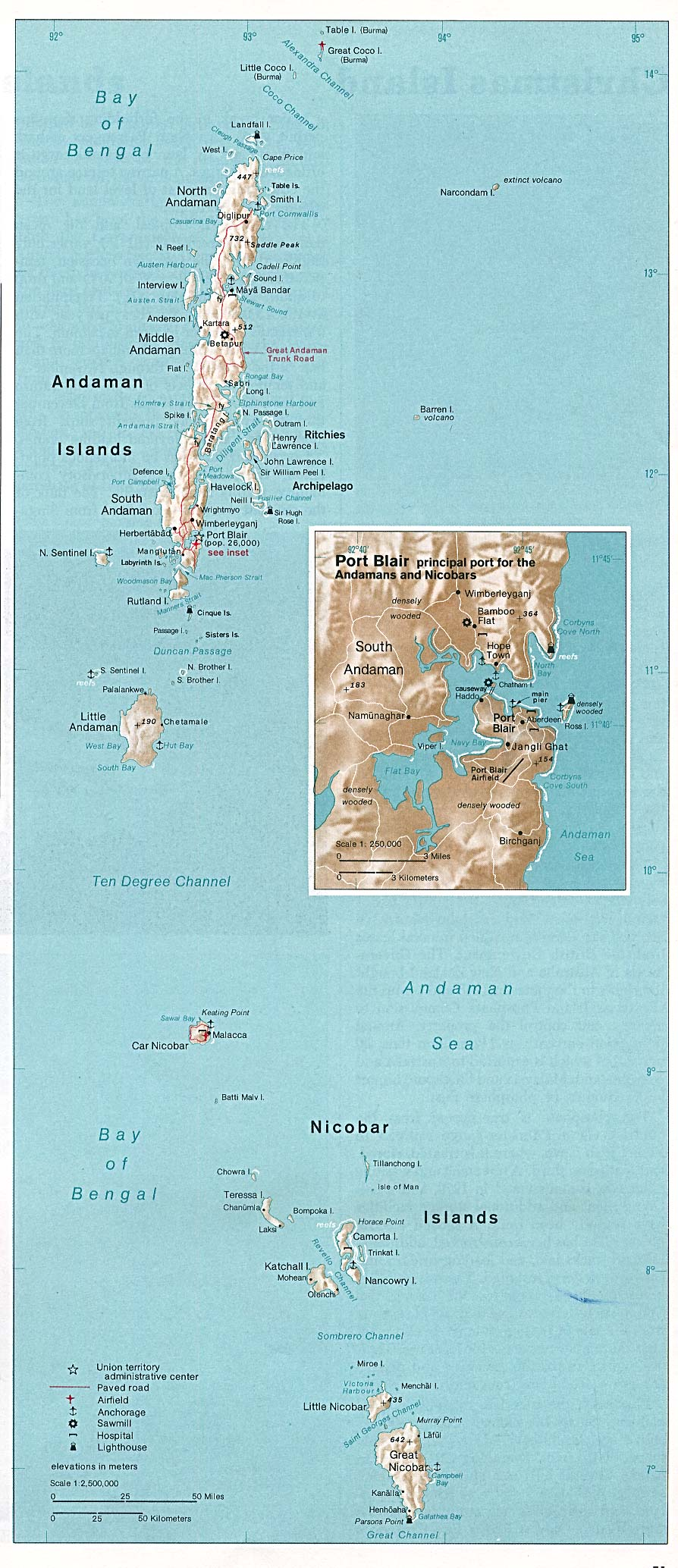
Cocos Strait, Duncan Passage
