= Passage Island (Andaman Islands) =

Uninhabited island of the Andaman Islands, India

- Location within Andaman and Nicobar Islands

Geography
- Location: Bay of Bengal
- Coordinates: 11.183°N 92.677°E
- Archipelago: Andaman Islands
- Adjacent to: Indian Ocean
- Area: 0.427 km^{2} (0.165 sq mi)
- Length: 1.35 km (0.839 mi)
- Width: 0.61 km (0.379 mi)
- Coastline: 4 km (2.5 mi)
- Highest elevation: 85 m (279 ft)

Administration
- India
- District: South Andaman
- Island group: Andaman Islands
- Island sub-group: Rutland Archipelago
- Tehsil: Port Blair Tehsil

Demographics
- Population: 0 (2011)

Additional information
- Time zone: IST (UTC+5:30)
- PIN: 744202
- Telephone code: 031927
- ISO code: IN-AN-00
- Official website: www.and.nic.in

Passage Island or Duncan Island is an uninhabited island of the Andaman Islands. It belongs to the South Andaman administrative district, part of the Indian union territory of Andaman and Nicobar Islands. The island is 53 km (33 mi) south from Port Blair.

== Geography ==
The island belongs to the Rutland Archipelago and is located between South Cinque Island (6.2 km (4 mi) to the north) and West Sister Island (6.4 km (4 mi) to the southeast). Duncan Passage is just south of this island, separating it from Little Andaman Island.

== Administration ==
Politically, Passage Island is part of Port Blair Taluk.
