= North Brother Island (Andaman Islands) =

Island in the Indian Ocean

- Location within Andaman and Nicobar Islands Location within Bay of Bengal

Geography
- Location: Bay of Bengal
- Coordinates: 10.988°N 92.664°E
- Archipelago: Andaman Islands
- Adjacent to: Indian Ocean

North Brother Island is an uninhabited island in the Indian Ocean, part of the Andaman Archipelago. It is located in the Duncan Passage, about 19 kilometre northeast of Little Andaman Island. It is part of the South Andaman district of the Andaman and Nicobar Islands, a Union Territory of India.

The island is nearly round, about 1.1 km across. It is almost flat, thickly wooded except in its central part, fringed by a narrow beach and surrounded by a reef all around. The central part is depressed and becomes a lake in the rainy season. A lighthouse tower was erected during 1992-93 and commissioned on 17 April 1993. The island hosts a 0.75 km^{2} wildlife sanctuary, established 1987.

By the end of the 19th century, the island was occasionally visited by the Onge of Little Andaman to catch sea turtles. It has been conjectured to be part of the route for the Onge expansion into south Great Andaman Island in the wake of the Great Andamanese tribes, around 1890 to 1930.

== See also ==
- South Brother Island, India
