= Little Andaman =

Island in India

Little Andaman Island
Native name: Gaubolambe
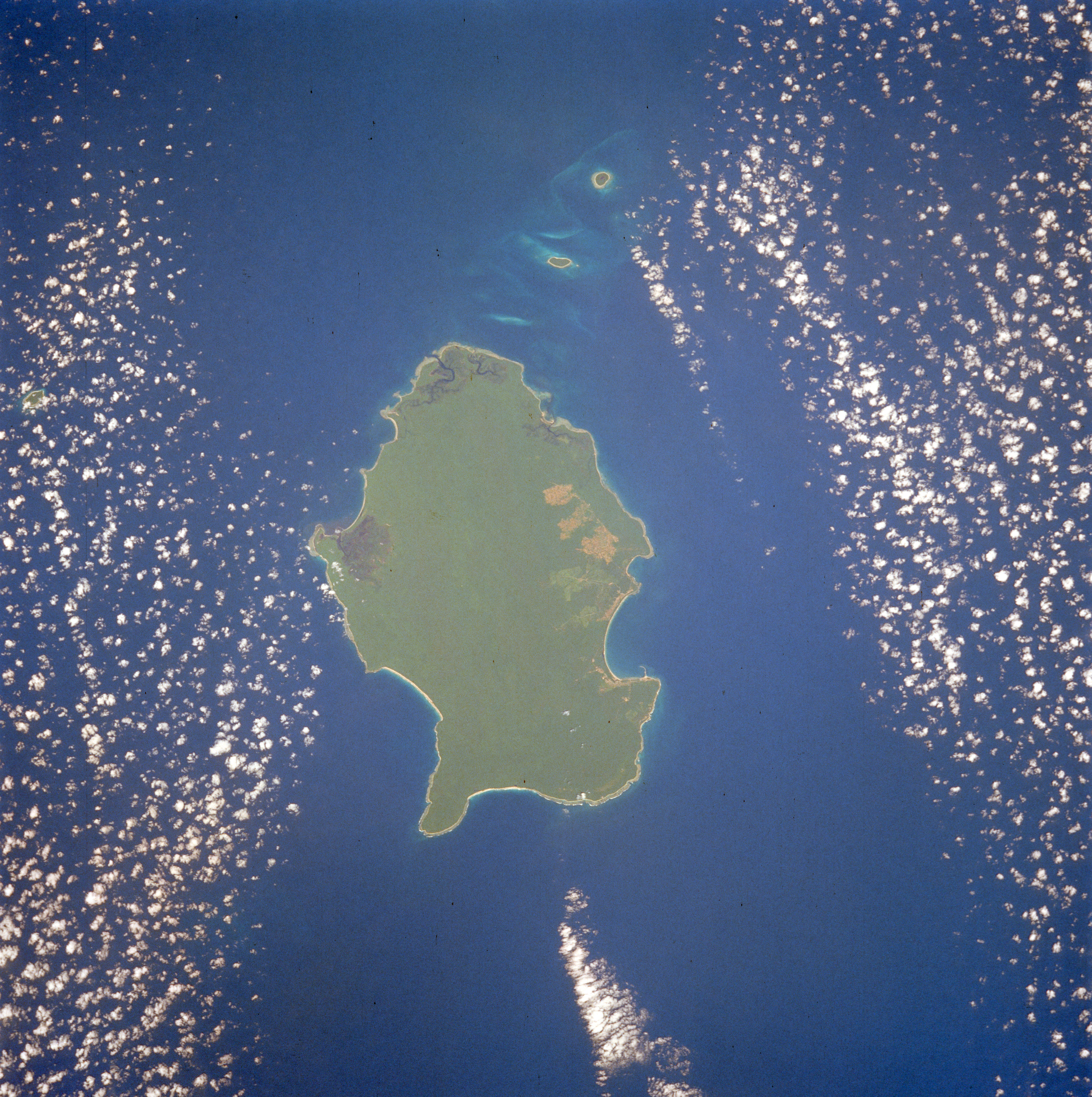
- 1990 Space Shuttle image of Little Andaman

- Location within Andaman and Nicobar Islands Location within Bay of Bengal

Geography
- Location: Bay of Bengal
- Coordinates: 10.65°N 92.49°E
- Archipelago: Andaman Islands
- Adjacent to: Indian Ocean
- Area: 707 km^{2} (273 sq mi)
- Area rank: 1
- Length: 24 km (14.9 mi)
- Width: 43 km (26.7 mi)
- Coastline: 132 km (82 mi)
- Highest elevation: 183 m (600 ft)

Administration
- India
- District: South Andaman
- Island group: Andaman Islands
- Island sub-group: Little Andaman Group
- Tehsil: Little Andaman Tehsil
- Largest settlement: Kwate-tu-Kwage (Hut Bay)

Demographics
- Population: 18,823 (2011)
- Pop. density: 26.6/km^{2} (68.9/sq mi)
- Ethnic groups: Onge, other Indians

Additional information
- Time zone: IST (UTC+5:30)
- PIN: 744207
- Telephone code: 031927
- ISO code: IN-AN-00
- Official website: www.and.nic.in
- Literacy: 84.4%
- Avg. summer temperature: 30.2 °C (86.4 °F)
- Avg. winter temperature: 23.0 °C (73.4 °F)
- Sex ratio: 1.2♂/♀
- Census Code: 35.640.0009
- Official Languages: Hindi, English

Little Andaman Island (Onge: Gaubolambe) is the fourth largest of the Andaman Islands of India with an area of 707 km^{2}, lying at the southern end of the archipelago. It belongs to the South Andaman administrative district, part of the Indian union territory of Andaman and Nicobar Islands. It lies 88 km (55 mi) south of Port Blair, the capital of Andaman and Nicobar Islands.

== Geography ==
The island is in the Bay of Bengal and belongs to the Little Andaman Group, and is separated from Rutland Island in Great Andaman by the Duncan Passage. The Little Andaman Group is the counterpart of the Great Andaman island group.

The low-lying island has widespread rainforest and several rare species of marine turtle. Little Andaman Island has white sandy beaches and bewitching waterfalls. The Little Andaman Lighthouse (a.k.a. Richardson's Lighthouse) is located 14 km south by road from Hut Bay port and is situated on the Southern tip of Little Andaman Island.

== Administration ==
Administratively, Little Andaman Island is part of Little Andaman Tehsil.

== Demographics ==
Ferrarganj tehsil in 2011 census
1. Bengali (48.6%)
2. Telugu (12.8%)
3. Kurukh (7.67%)
4. Nicobarese (7.45%)
5. Tamil (7.17%)
6. Sadri (5.97%)
7. Hindi (4.14%)
8. Malalyalam (3.16%)
9. Kharia (0.81%)
10. Others (2.21%)

Bengali is the most spoken language in Ferrargunj tehsil. As of 2011 census, Bengali is spoken as the first language by 48.60 percent of the district's population.

Language speakers in Little Andaman
Language	Population
Bengali	9,148
Telugu	2,413
Kurukh	1,444
Necobarese	1,403
Tamil	1,349
Sadri	1,123
Hindi	780
Malayalam	595
Kharia	152

== Transportation ==
Hut Bay wharf, a deep water wharf that can be approached through a gap in the coral reef, on the east coast of the island is the entry point of Little Andaman Island. Daily boat services connect Hut Bay wharf with Port Blair in seven hours voyage. Additionally, there are a helicopter services by Pavan Hans Ltd. and a sea plane connection available between Port Blair and Hut Bay. The flight time by helicopter or sea plane is approximately 40 minutes.

Airlines	Destinations
Jal Hans	Port Blair

There is a road alongside the east coastal line.

== Tourism ==
Little Andaman offers surfing, boating through the creeks, and visits to an elephant logging plantation. Butler Bay, 14 km from the Hut Bay Jetty, is a beach popular among tourists due to coral viewing, surfing and other marine activities. Tourist huts are available on the seashore itself flanked by the coconut plantation. Netaji Nagar Beach is 11 km from the Hut Bay jetty.

=== Climate ===
Climate data for Little Andaman (Hut Bay) 1991–2020, extremes 1969–2020
Month	Jan	Feb	Mar	Apr	May	Jun	Jul	Aug	Sep	Oct	Nov	Dec	Year
Record high °C (°F)	34.4 (93.9)	35.2 (95.4)	36.4 (97.5)	36.4 (97.5)	35.8 (96.4)	36.3 (97.3)	36.4 (97.5)	35.6 (96.1)	33.6 (92.5)	35.6 (96.1)	34.0 (93.2)	34.4 (93.9)	36.4 (97.5)
Mean daily maximum °C (°F)	31.4 (88.5)	32.2 (90.0)	33.1 (91.6)	33.6 (92.5)	32.1 (89.8)	31.1 (88.0)	30.8 (87.4)	30.6 (87.1)	30.3 (86.5)	31.1 (88.0)	31.4 (88.5)	31.1 (88.0)	31.6 (88.9)
Mean daily minimum °C (°F)	22.9 (73.2)	21.9 (71.4)	22.0 (71.6)	23.5 (74.3)	24.4 (75.9)	24.5 (76.1)	24.5 (76.1)	24.4 (75.9)	24.2 (75.6)	23.9 (75.0)	23.8 (74.8)	23.3 (73.9)	23.6 (74.5)
Record low °C (°F)	14.1 (57.4)	13.6 (56.5)	16.3 (61.3)	15.0 (59.0)	18.2 (64.8)	16.4 (61.5)	17.8 (64.0)	18.6 (65.5)	15.8 (60.4)	15.7 (60.3)	16.6 (61.9)	15.4 (59.7)	13.6 (56.5)
Average rainfall mm (inches)	69.8 (2.75)	20.3 (0.80)	58.4 (2.30)	88.1 (3.47)	341.0 (13.43)	336.1 (13.23)	328.6 (12.94)	291.9 (11.49)	438.6 (17.27)	308.3 (12.14)	231.2 (9.10)	148.4 (5.84)	2,660.8 (104.76)
Average rainy days	2.9	1.3	2.5	4.8	15.5	15.6	16.8	16.6	19.0	14.6	11.8	6.4	127.8
Average relative humidity (%) (at 17:30 IST)	78	75	74	75	83	86	86	85	88	88	86	82	82
Source: India Meteorological Department

== Image gallery ==
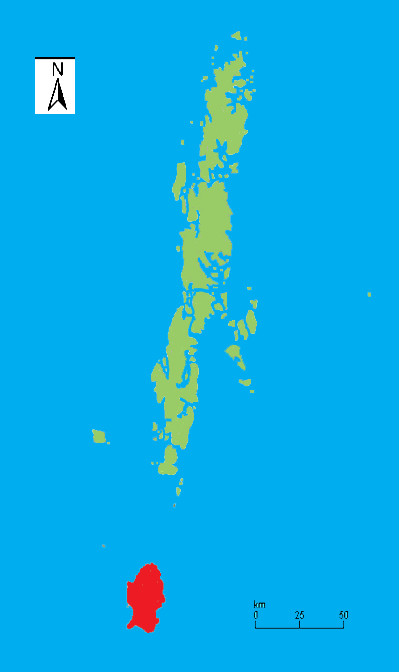
Outline map of the Andaman Islands, with the location of Little Andaman highlighted (in red).

== See also ==
- Administrative divisions of India
