= Josiah Marshall Heath =

English metallurgist, businessman and naturalist

- Born: 8 November 1790
- Died: 28 January 1851
- Known for: Use of manganese for crucible steel
- Scientific career
- Fields: Metallurgy
- Workplaces: Sheffield

Josiah Marshall Heath (8 November 1790 – 28 January 1851) was an English metallurgist, businessman and naturalist, who invented the use of manganese to deoxidise steel. In India he learned the local steel-making processes, including wootz, but having failed to found a profitable steel mill there he returned to England and settled in Sheffield. His patent kick-started Sheffield's steel industry, but the poor wording of his patent caused competitors not to pay him royalties, and he died in poverty.

== Career in India ==
Heath was the son of Rear-Admiral William Heath (1749-1815) and his first wife Rebecca (1765-1795) who was the daughter of Rev. Josiah Marshall, rector of Fahan. He joined the East India Company in 1806 as a Writer in the Madras Presidency. In 1808 he became an assistant to the secretary of the Board of Revenue and in 1809 an examiner under the Secretary to the Board of Trade. In 1811 he became a registrar of Chingleput Zilla. In 1812 he was deputy commercial resident at Salem. At the start of the 19th century, metallurgy in British India was very traditional, localised and artisanal. In 1820 he left his civil service position. Around 1825, Heath (who wanted to continue the important progress of European methods), obtained from the British East India Company the monopoly of iron production over a large area centred on Madras. He studied iron and steel making in England and returned to India in 1830 where he built a factory at Porto Novo, in the south of the Arcot district, with a government loan.

In 1833, the company was named the Porto Novo Steel and Iron Company, the workshops were enlarged and a new factory was built at Beypore in the Malabar region. The steel was of very good quality, and was even exported to Great Britain where it was used, notably, in the construction of the Menai Suspension Bridge and the Britannia Bridge, across the Menai Straits between mainland Wales and Anglesey (Welsh: Ynys Môn). But the business ran at a loss, because of management failings, technical inexperience, lack of funding and the sole use of charcoal as a combustion agent. (A buyer had previously suggested to Heath that he move his factory to the Burdwan district of Bengal, where coal was abundant, but he did not act on the suggestion.)

The business was taken over by the East India Company in 1853, who continued running it as a going concern until 1874, when it was placed into liquidation.

Heath married Charlotte Catherine, daughter of General Charles Fraser (c.1737–95) and Isabella Hook (1755–1821), in Madras in 1816.

== Career in England ==
On returning to England, Heath profited from his experience and observations of traditional Indian metalworking. In 1839 he filed a patent concerning the use of a compound of manganese and carbon which he had invented and called "carbide". This is not what is now called carbide, but was a mixture of only those two elements.

I propose to produce a superior quality of cast steel, by taking ordinary bars of steel, ground as usual, or mixtures of iron or malleable iron and carbonaceous materials, with 1 to 3 parts per hundred by weight of carbide of manganese, and then placing them in a crucible and subjecting them to a heat suitable to melt these materials; when they have become liquid, they can be cast in a mould, in the usual manner. I do not claim to be part of my invention the use of any of these admixtures of malleable cast iron, or ductile iron and carbonaceous material, but only the use of manganese carbide in any method of converting molten iron to cast steel.

— J.M. Heath, patent of 5 April 1839, Quoted in Percy^{[Back translated from French Wikipedia]}

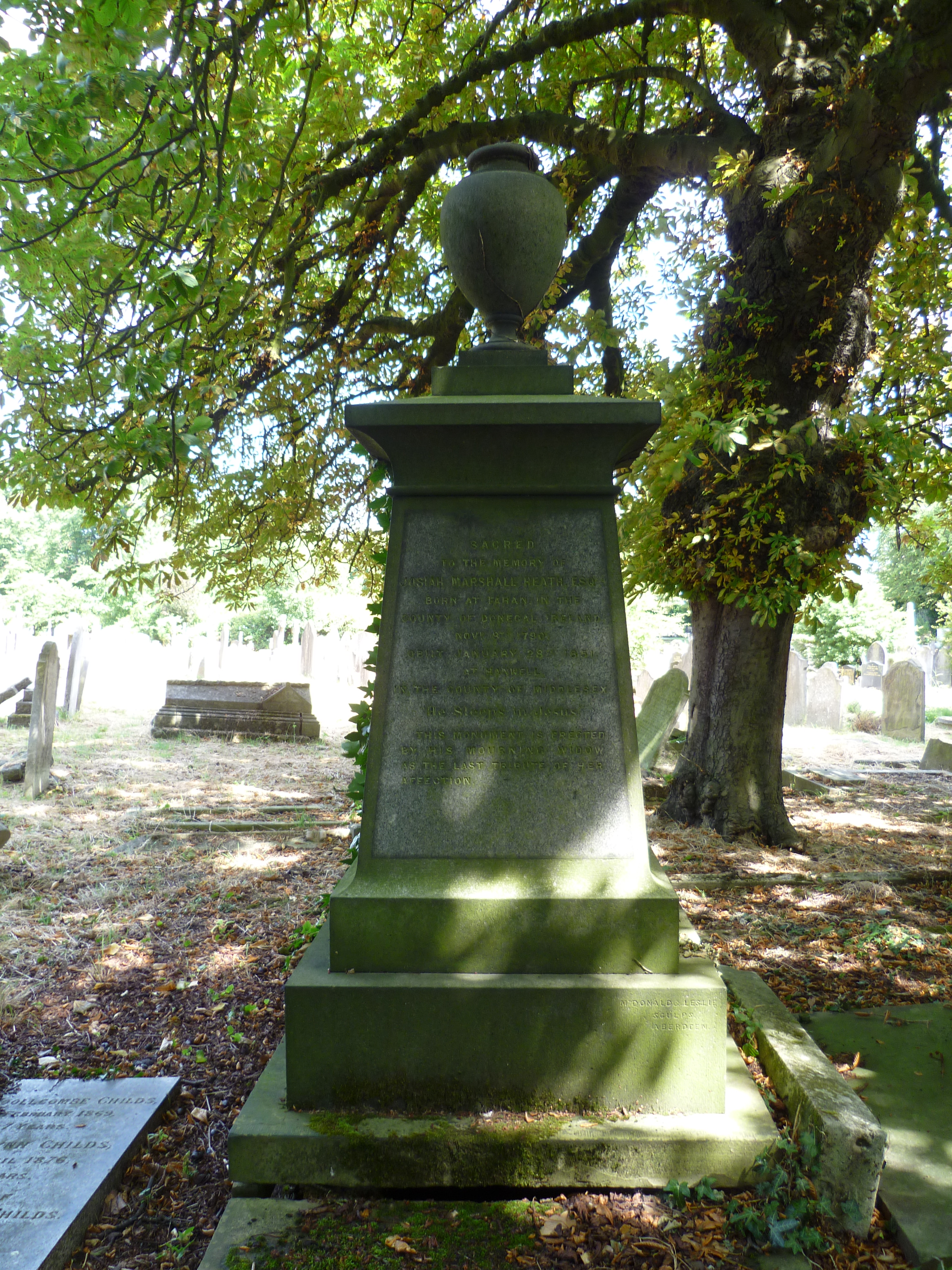
Grave at Kensal Green

This compound, together with the development of crucible steel, made the steel malleable when hot, and amenable to brazing and welding, even though the steel was formed from iron founded with addition of sulphur.

Manganese carbide, as described by Heath, was made by heating the crucible with a mixture of manganese oxide and tar: at high temperature the carbon in the tar causes an oxygen reduction ("redox") in the manganese oxide. Heating the mixture is a costly process, so Heath proposed that his licencees add the manganese and charcoal directly to the crucible so as to make crucible steel. The heat necessary to make the steel also means the charcoal contributes to the redox of the manganese oxide. But although Heath's process removes the need for preparing the carbide separately, it also involves a loss of control over the process. It is difficult to apply his invention in isolation, because making steel in a crucible requires the use of other methods which are always kept as trade secrets – so that other steel producers contested the validity of Heath's patent as describing his actual process. Heath's innovation worked, but nobody would pay royalties on it. After nine years of legal proceedings, the British House of Lords (then the highest court in the land) recognised the patent in its aspect of the first use of manganese oxide. Thomas Webster, one of Heath's lawyers, wrote:

Unfortunately, a very great uncertainty is cast over the procedure used to maintain and defend property relating to inventions. The Heath case is one of the most extraordinary examples of such uncertainty. After twelve years of argument in front of eighteen judges, Privy Counsellors and lords, the result was only that twelve judges, presided over by Lord Brougham and the Lord Chancellor, found for Mr. Heath by seven in favour and six against; of the eleven judges who then heard the case in the House of Lords, in the final trial, seven were in favour and four against.

— Thomas Webster, Quoted in Percy

Because of this, Heath was impoverished before he died. The general adoption of his process lowered the price of quality steel by 30% to 40% in the Sheffield market (Heath himself was content with a 2% reduction in the selling price).

== Other work ==
The Greater Asiatic yellow bat (Scotophilus heathi) was named in his honour after he presented the type specimen to the Zoological Society of London, together with a large collection of Asiatic birds. The fishing cat was described as a new species based on a specimen sent by Heath from India. Among the bird specimens sent by Heath were a Eurasian griffon vulture collected from near Madras.

When Heath was posted in Coimbatore around 1818 he experimented with the cultivation of Bourbon cotton (Gossypium hirsutum).

A casket that belonged to Tipu Sultan was taken by Colonel Henry Fraser in 1799 and sent to his mother. This then went to the youngest daughter Charlotte Catherine who became Heath's wife. Heath passed it on to a cousin and it finally went to the British Museum in 1904.
