= Parangipettai railway station =

Railway station in Tamil Nadu

Parangipettai - PO
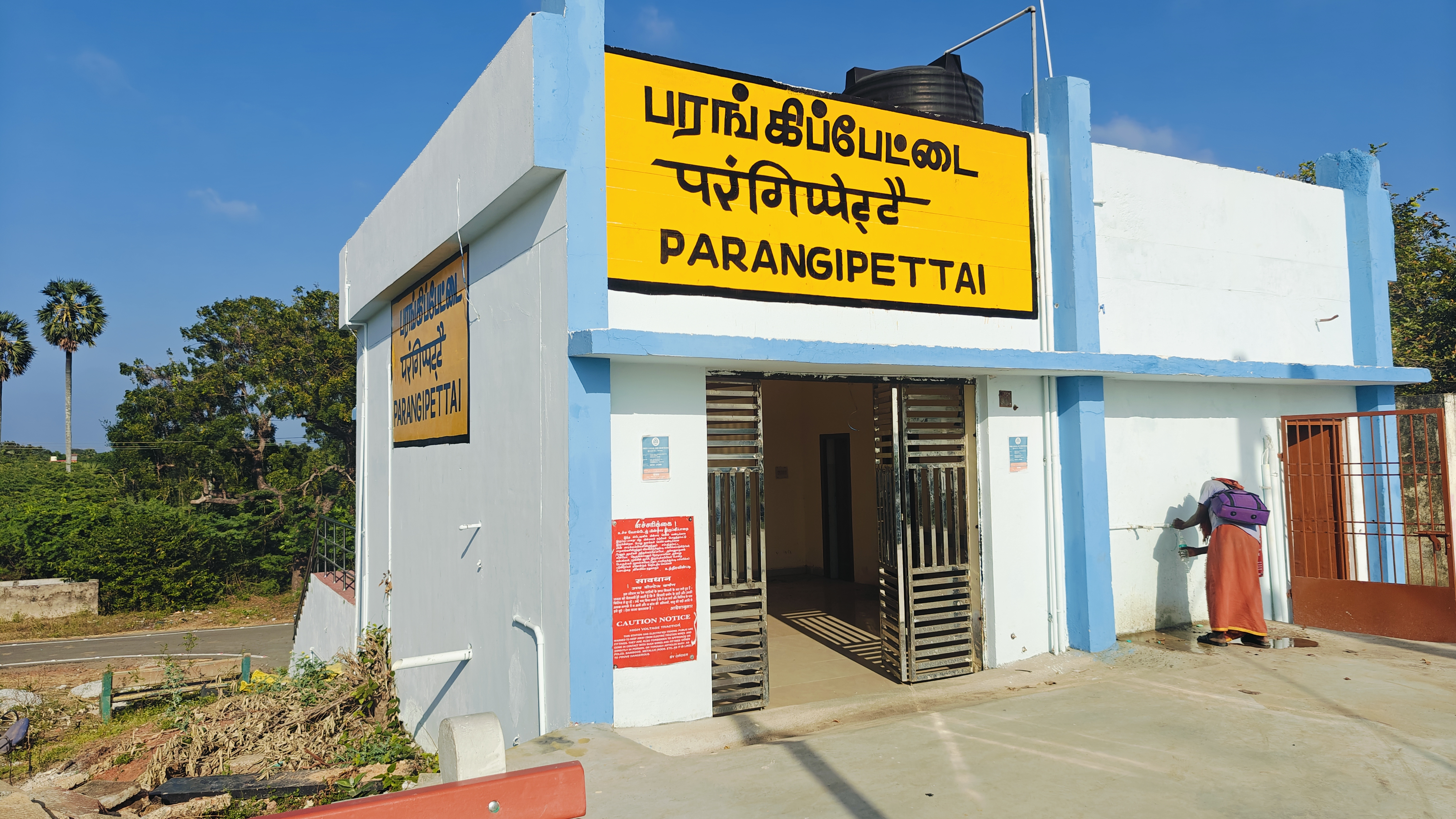
- Parangipettai railway station

General information
- Location: Mutlur Road, Parangipettai, Cuddalore District, Tamil Nadu -608502
- Coordinates: 11.47698°N 79.73679°E
- Elevation: 6 m (20 ft)
- System: Indian Railways station
- Owner: Indian Railways
- Operator: TPJ Division, Southern Railways
- Manager: Halt Agent
- Line: Chennai Egmore–Villupuram–Mayiladuthurai–Thanjavur main line
- Platforms: 1
- Tracks: 1
- Connections: Bus, Auto rickshaw

Construction
- Structure type: Standard (On the ground)
- Parking: Yes
- Accessible: Yes

Other information
- Status: Live Functioning
- Station code: PO
- Zone(s): Southern Railway
- Division(s): Tiruchirappalli

History
- Opened: 1 July 1877; 149 years ago
- Electrified: 25 kV AC 50 Hz on 7 February 2020; 6 years ago

Passengers
- 2016-2017 2017-2018 2018-2019 2019-2020: 1.21 Lakhs; 2.36 Lakhs; 1.48 Lakhs; 1.49 Lakhs
Services
Passenger trains
MEMU Trains
Journey Pass
Monthly Pass
Passenger Amenities
Drinking water - 2 Nos.
Waiting hall - 39 Sq.m
Platform height - 84 cm (Rail level)
Lights - 25 Nos.
Parking - 104 Sq.m
Public Toilet (Paid) - 🚹︎ - 4, 🚺︎ - 4 and ♿︎ - 1
Platform shelter - 192 Sq.m(1), 26 Sq.m(4)
Time table - Avl
Dustbin - Avl
Contracts
Contracts - Contractor's Name - Details
Halt Agent - R. Rathiga - Issue Tickets
Pay&Use Toilet - D. Ramesh - Maintain and collect fee
Weekly market - R.Ramesh - Collect License fee
Vehicle parking area - R. Ramesh - Secure and collect fee
Route map
Location
- Location within Tamil Nadu

Parangipettai railway station is located in Parangipettai, Tamil Nadu, India. During the British rule in Parangipettai and about 15 years after the independence of the country, the railway transport has been good. After the modernization of transport facilities, Parangipettai was left very backward. The Southern Railways was categorized PO Station as NSG-6 in 2017. Now, Categorized as HG-2 on 2023.

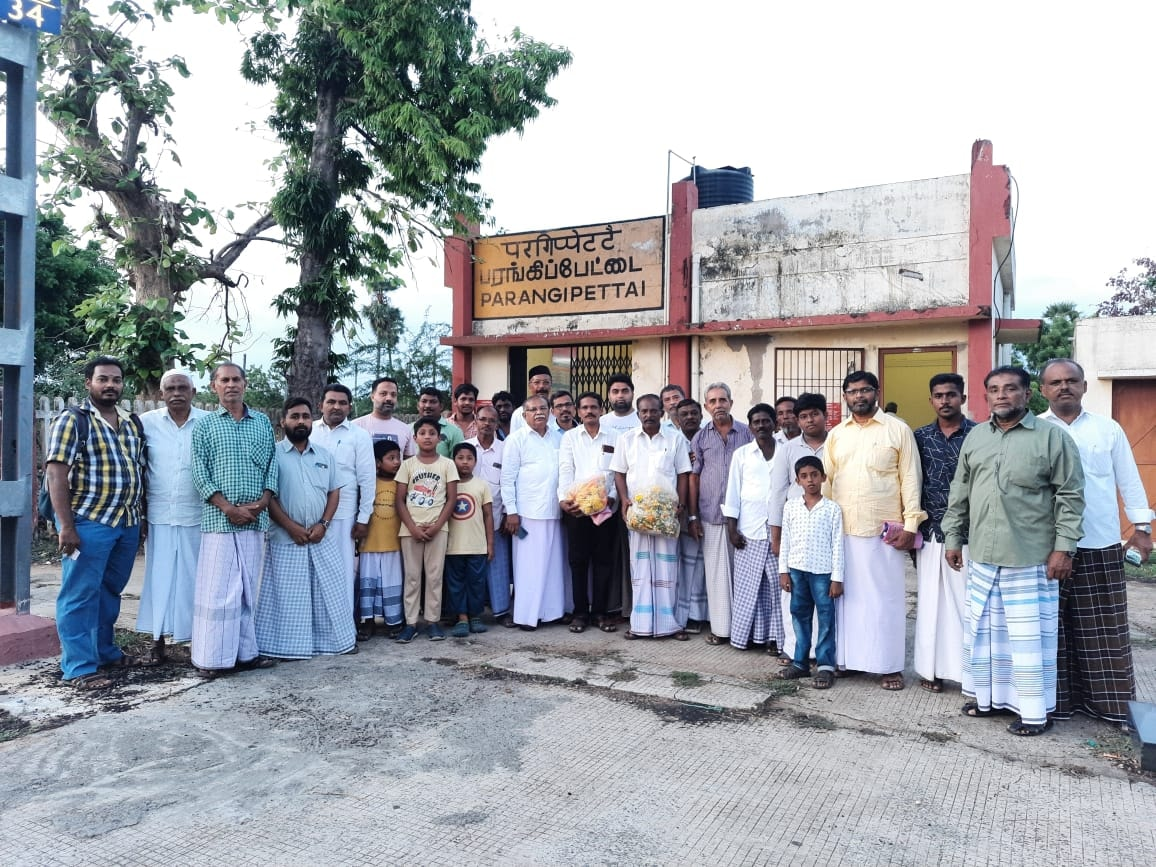
To welcome new train stoppage at Parangipettai Railway Station

After the conversion to broad gauge, only 6 trains bound for Villupuram and Mayiladuthurai, in addition to two more trains for Bangalore - Karaikal, a total of 8 trains stop at Parangipettai. None of the 60+ express trains that pass through Parangipettai stop here.

Train-time Table
Train No.	Time	Via	Runs	Train Name
56808	7:04 AM	MV-VM	Daily	Thiruvarur - Villupuram Passenger
56813	7:30 AM	VM-MV	Daily	Villupuram - Mayiladuthurai Passenger
16530	8:13 AM	KIK-SMVB	Daily	SMVT Bengaluru Express
66019	4:18 PM	VM-MV	Daily	Villupuram - Mayiladuthurai MEMU
66020	4:48 PM	MV-VM	Daily	Mayiladuthurai - Villupuram MEMU
16529	6:12 PM	SMVB-KIK	Daily	Karaikal Express
56814	7:11 PM	MV-VM	Daily	Mayiladuthurai - Villupuram Passenger
56807	8:05 PM	VM-MV	Daily	Villupuram - Thiruvarur Passenger
Source: Indian Railways

== Remains of old building of Parangipettai Railway Station ==
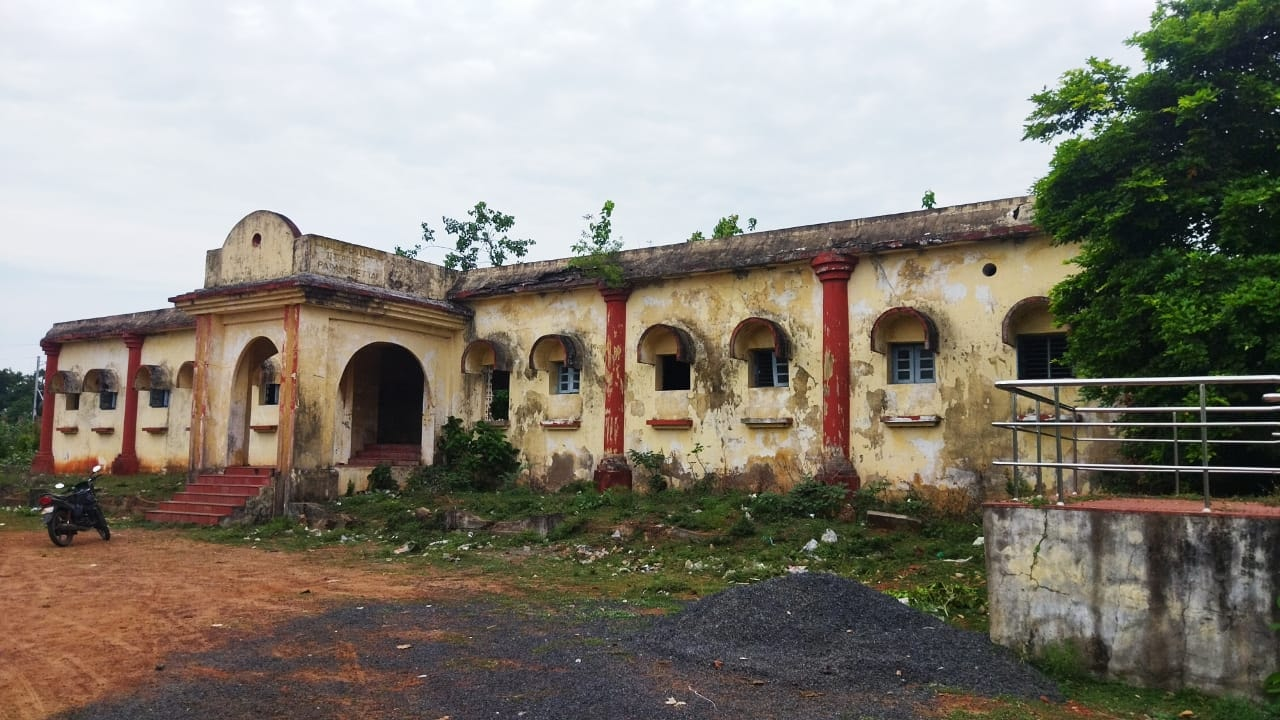

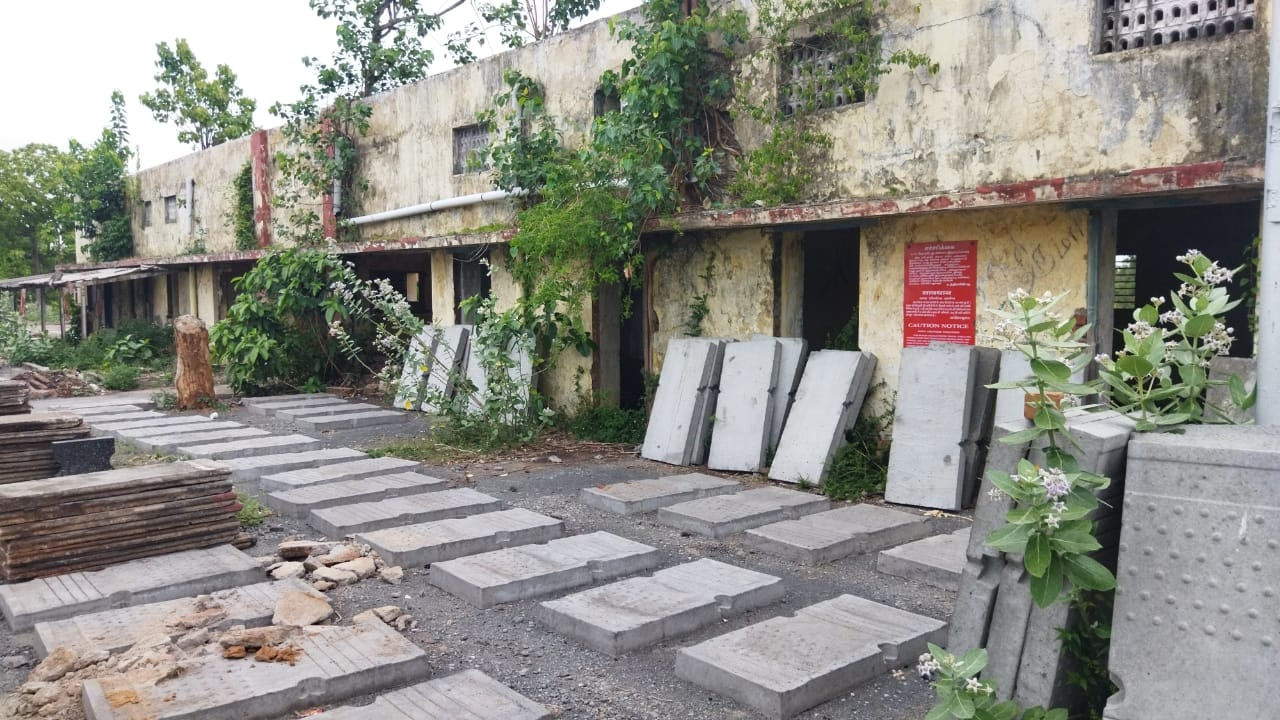

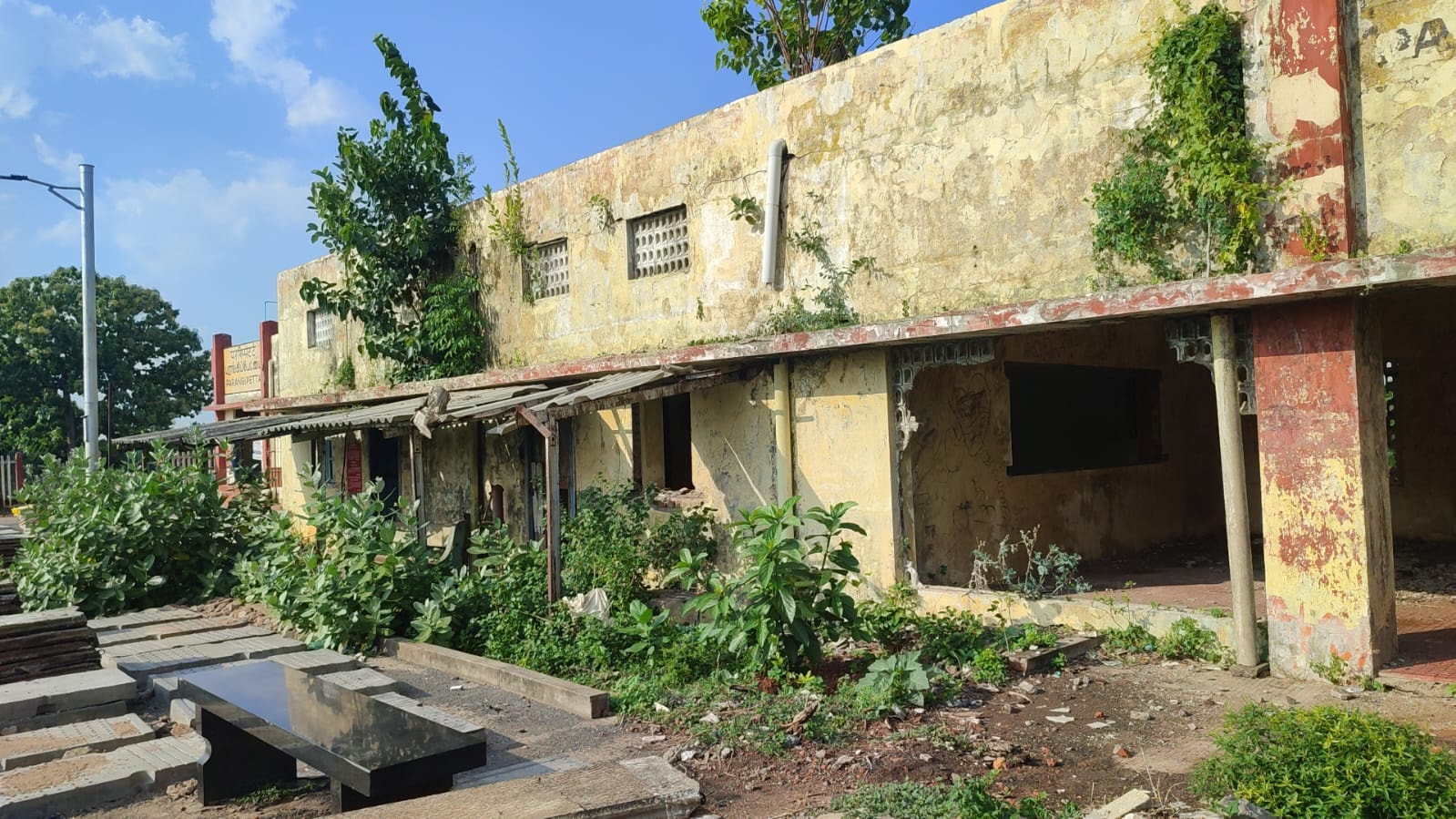

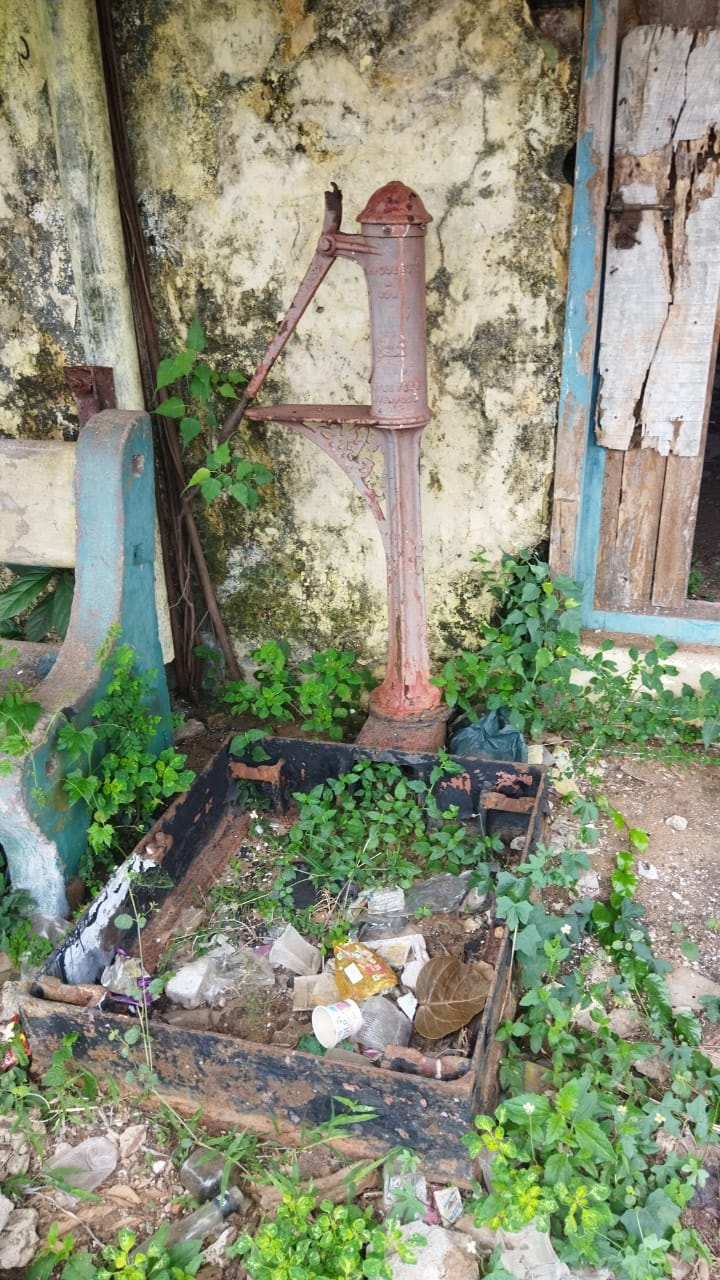

Parangipettai Railway Station in Bhuvanagiri taluk of Southern Forest District, 17 miles from Cuddalore (O.T), 29 1/2 from Mayavaram (Mayiladuthurai), and 145 miles from Madras (Egmore). Parangipettai town is about a mile east of the railway station.

== Books ==
South Indian Railway Company titled "The Illustrated Guide to the South Indian Railway" published in the years 1900, 1903, 1909, and 1926 has provided information about Parangipettai railway station in one and a half pages in 1900.

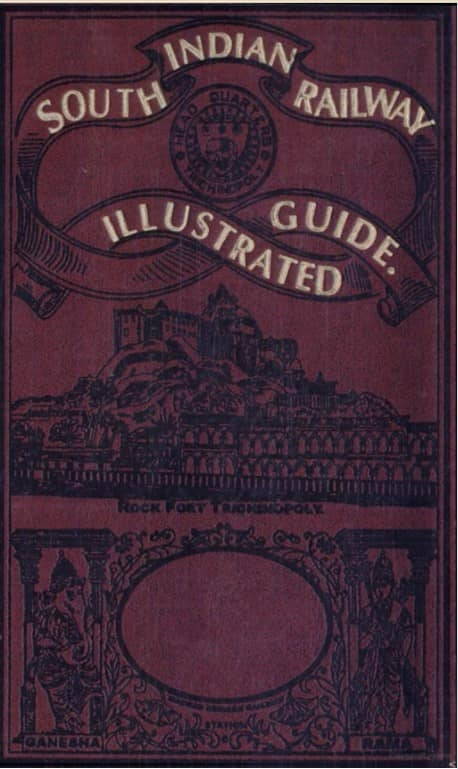
The South Indian Railway Illustrated Guide in 1926

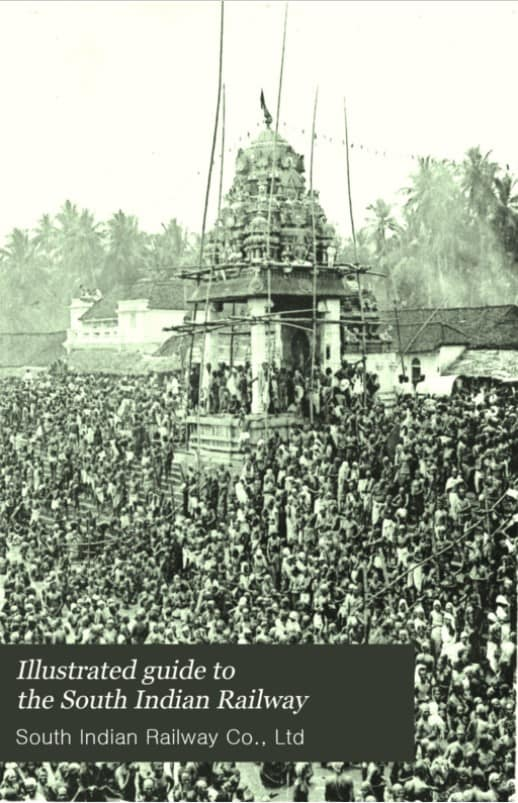
The Illustrated Guide to South Indian Railway in 1907

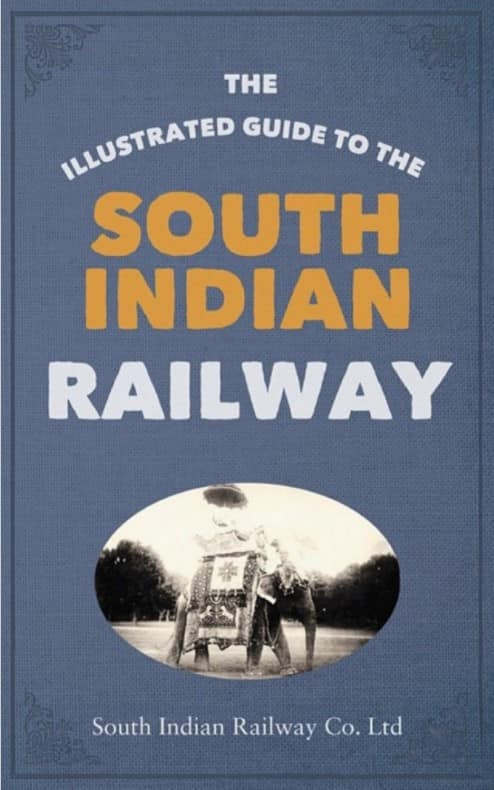
The Illustrated Guide to the South Indian Railway in 1900
