= Portonovo Lighthouse =

Historical Lighthouse of India and Tamil Nadu

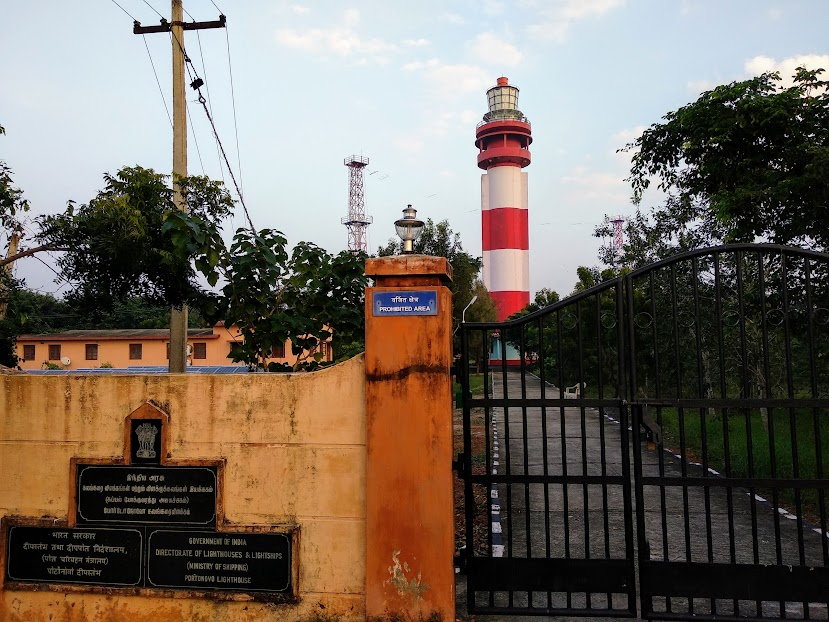
- Portonovo Lighthouse And Navtex Station
- Location: Portonovo Lighthouse Cum Navtex Station, Parangipettai, Cuddalore District; Tamil Nadu, India.
- Coordinates: 11.5042708°N 79.7704575°E

Tower
- Constructed: September 30, 1980; 45 years ago
- Foundation: Concrete (At-ground)
- Automated: Rotating Beacon
- Height: 30 metres (98 ft)
- Shape: Circular tower
- Markings: Red and White Band
- Operator: DGLL of Chennai
- Heritage: Lighthouses of Tamil Nadu
- Racon: Tide Land (Sea Beacon 2)

Light
- First lit: March 31, 1981; 44 years ago
- Focal height: 32.99 metres (108.2 ft)
- Lens: 6
- Light source: 150W/ 230V Single end CDMT Lamp
- Intensity: 10,3000 cdl
- Range: 25.7 nautical miles (47.6 km)
- Characteristic: FL.W. 15s
- India no.: F 0919

Portonovo Lighthouse is a lighthouse in Parangipettai, Tamil Nadu, India. It is one of seven NAVTEX facilitated lighthouses in India. The lighthouse was established and is maintained by the Directorate of Lighthouses and Lightships at the Ministry of Ports, a ministry of the Government of India. The lighthouse has three working staff.

The lighthouse comprises a 39 m (128 ft) round cylindrical concrete tower with lantern and double gallery, painted with horizontal red and white bands. The lantern's active focal plane is 36 m (118 ft); a white flash occurs every 15 seconds.

== History ==
The port of Portonovo is situated at the mouth of Vellar river in the Bay of Bengal. The Portuguese were invited to trade here by Gingee Krishnappa Nayaka, who built this port in 1590.

The lighthouse is located on the north bank of the mouth of the Vellar River roughly 30 km from the city of Cuddalore. At the time of construction, the lighthouse cost 20 lakhs to complete.

The lighthouse and shore were affected by the 2004 Indian Ocean tsunami.

The Union Shipping Minister GK Vasan inaugurated the renovated lighthouse and the Lighthouse Technology Museum by laying the foundation stone for an information exchange program to help fishermen called Navtex in a program held near the Chennai lighthouse on November 14, 2013.

The NAVTEX communication project was implemented at a cost of 20.25 crores to communicate information about sea climate changes, weather warnings, and rescue operations directly to ships in print form. Out of seven NAXTEV broadcasting stations in India, two stations (including Portonovo Lighthouse) are located in Tamil Nadu. The NAVTEX system at Portonovo can reach as far as the state of Andhra Pradesh. It can communicate over a distance of 720 km from shore, benefiting over 15,000 fishermen in Tamil Nadu in the area.
