= Porto Novo Iron Works =

India's largest iron and steel factory in 1830s

Coordinates: 11°29′14″N 79°45′41″E

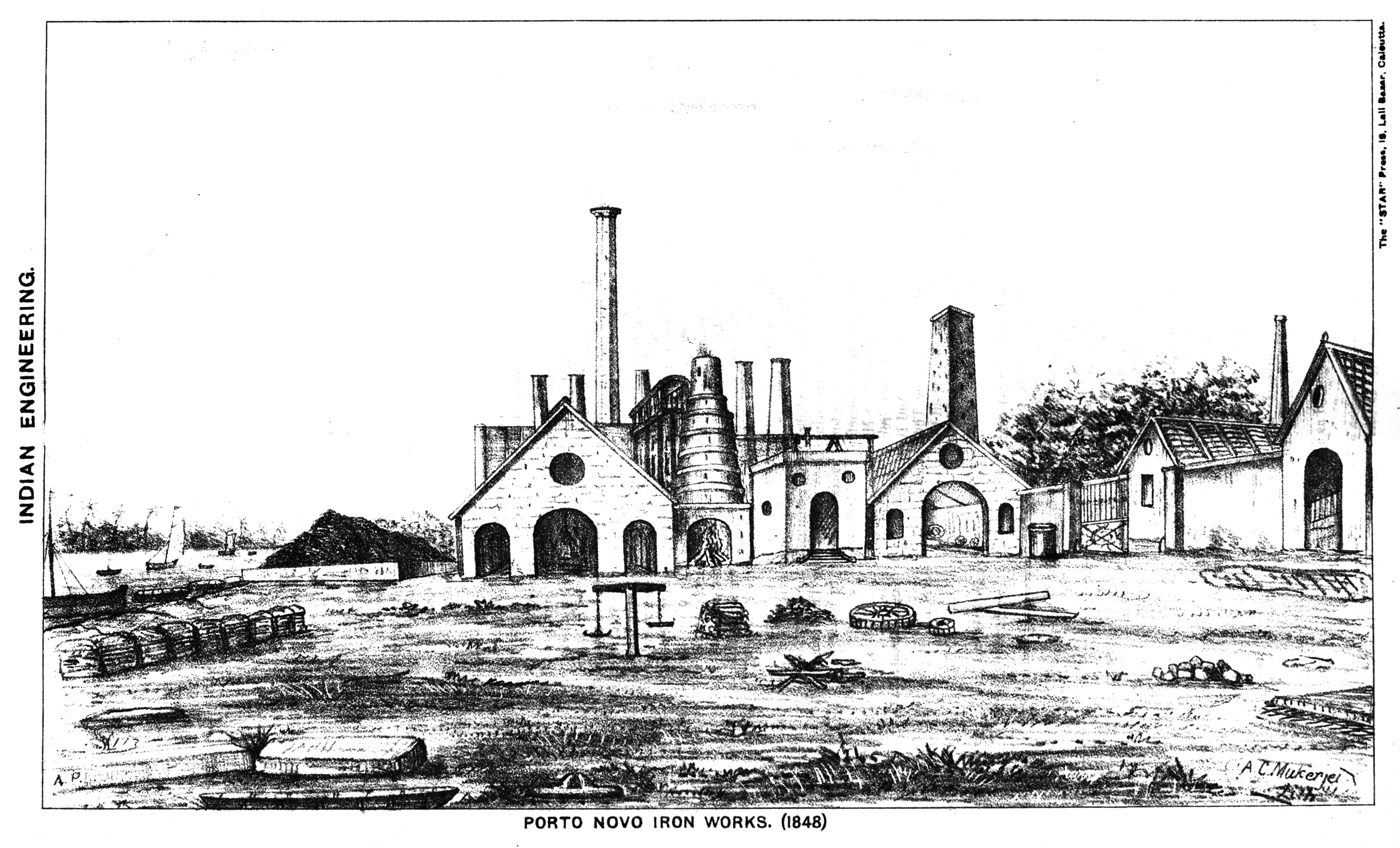
- Porto Novo Iron Works c. 1848
- Built: 1830; 196 years ago
- Operated: 1830; 196 years ago
- Location: Porto Novo (Parangipettai), South Arcot (Cuddalore District), Madras Presidency (Tamil Nadu), India
- Industry: Iron and Steel
- Products: Iron, Pig iron
- Owner: Josiah Marshall Heath (Founder)
- Defunct: 1874; 152 years ago

Porto Novo Iron Works known subsequently as the Indian Steel and Iron company, Porto Novo Iron Company or Porto Novo Steel and Iron Company was a historic iron and steel plant in southern India founded in 1830 by Josiah Marshall Heath and later taken over by the East India Company. The factory was initially located at Porto Novo, now known as Parangipettai, in South Arcot District of Tamil Nadu but was later moved due to fuel shortage to Beypore on the west coast of India. Iron and steel from the plant was used to construct the railway stations at Madras central and Egmore stations and was also exported to Sheffield. The company was dissolved in 1874.

It was the oldest and first Iron & Steel plant in India and one of Asia's largest iron manufacturing plants in the 1880s. The Portonovo steel was supplied to England and was used to construct the Menai and Britannia bridges. The first pier of the Chennai Port was constructed in 1861 with Porto Novo iron. The porto novo supplied the tracks for the India's first railroad "The Red Hill Railroad" laid in 1836. In the 1850s, 500 tons of wrought iron was supplied by the Porto Novo iron works at rupees 60 a ton for the Construction of railway lines to Raneegunge in West Bengal. 2,000 worth 400 ploughs were sold to the Bombay Presidency in 1837 and one hundred tons of iron requested by Secretary in 1846.

== History ==
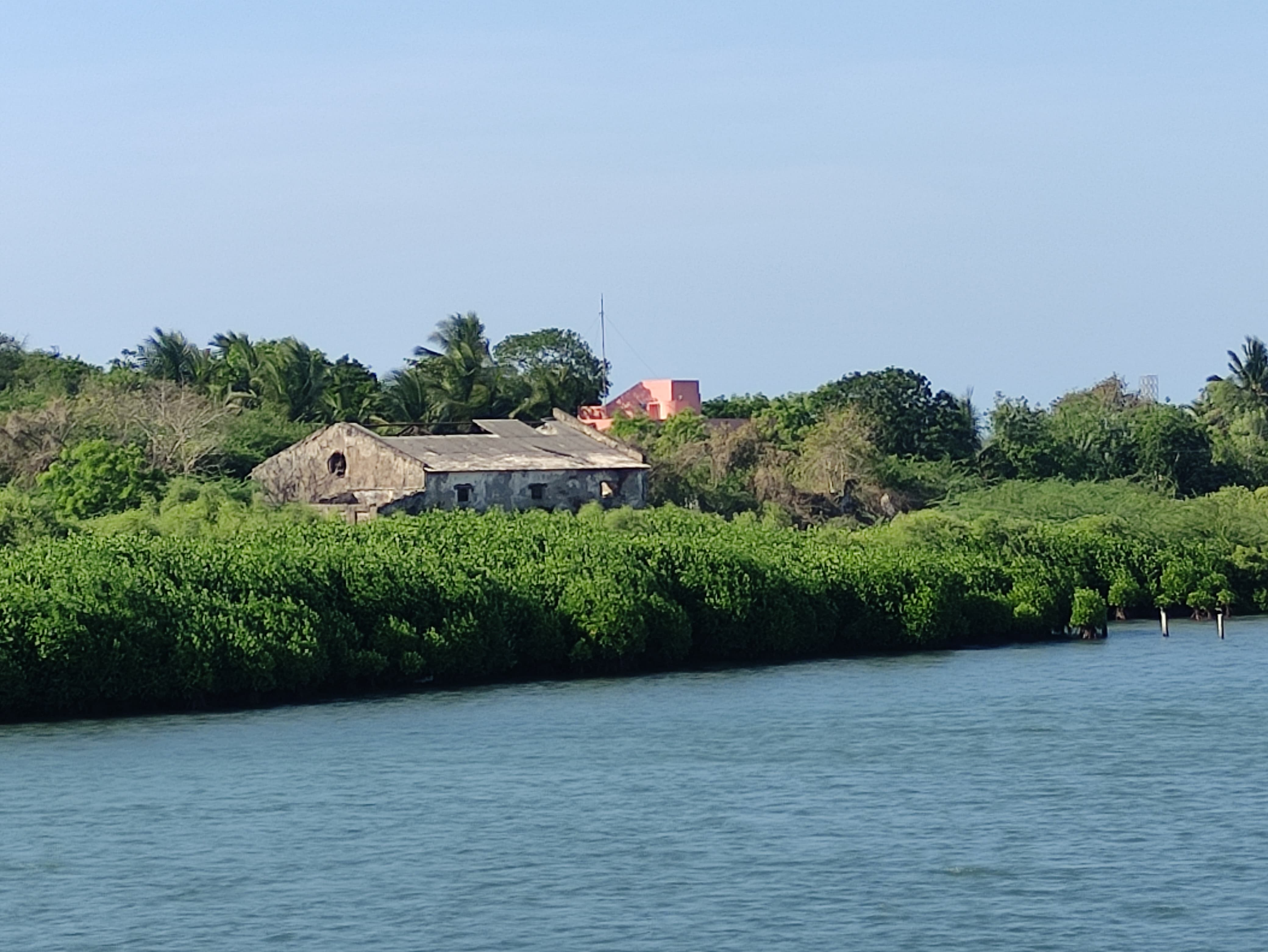
The remains of the Porto Novo Iron Works

Heath had worked in Salem as part of the East India Company as a commercial resident. His first encounter with Indian methods of iron and steel making was prompted when a friend in northern India sought a shot for hunting guns. He also lived in the Nilgiris during summers and he had noted that the native steel-making process (including that of Wootz) was defective and yet produced fine cutlery. In 1818 J. M. Heath of the East India Company was stationed at Porto Novo and he proposed that if European processes were used, good quality steel could be produced from the ores obtained from Salem and that this production could be of importance to Imperial power. Heath was supported by Thomas Munro and Alexander and Co. of Calcutta and in 1825 he resigned from the Madras civil service and decided to establish an iron plant. He went back to England to study steel making and returned to India to set up some the early works at Porto Novo in 1830 and it was called the Porto Novo Iron Works but this plant was only able to produce pig iron as he only had access to charcoal and limited infrastructure. He had chosen the location as it was close to Salem where there was iron ore and it was connected by the Vellar river and the Khan Sahib canal (which had been opened in 1854) to the Kollidam. He then proposed to the Governor of Madras, Sir Frederick Adam in 1824 that a better factory could be established with government assistance to obtain ores and fuel. He received rights to ores over the Madras Presidency and was given a monopoly for steel manufacture for 21 years in the districts of North Arcot and South Arcot, Trichinopoly, Salem, Coimbatore and Malabar. The factory was renamed as the Indian Iron and Steel Company in 1833 with Parry and Company being the main sponsors. Some of the products produced for the Indian market included ploughs, 400 of which were sold to the Bombay Presidency in 1837. Furnaces, forges and rolling mills were initially built at Porto Novo but after the 1855 it moved to Beypore on the west coast where the first Bessemer converters were installed.

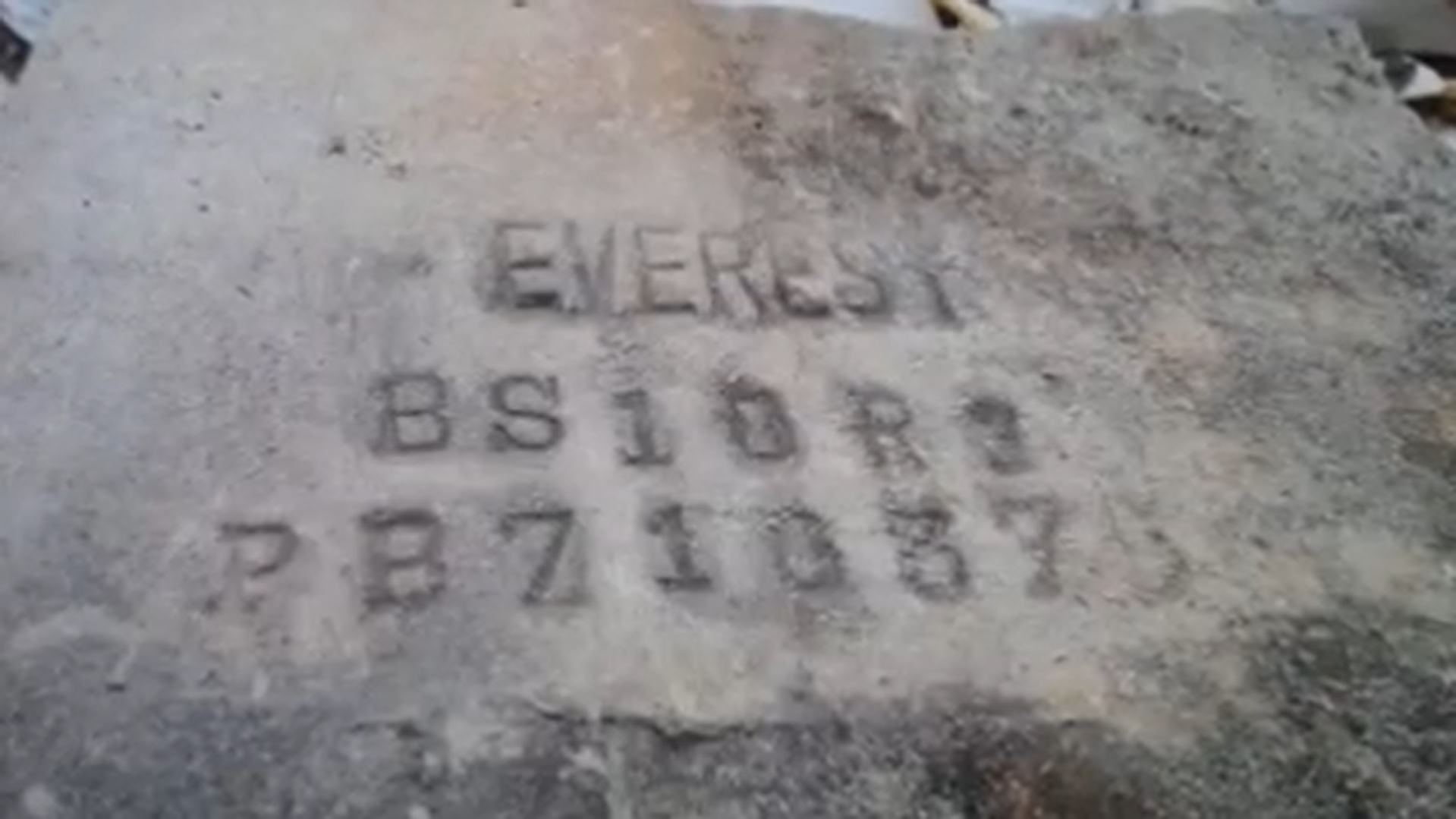

Heath had examined ideas by Rene Antoine Ferchault de Reaumur and Benjamin Huntsman and made trials of steel making with manganese. In 1839 he obtained a patent for his process and several foundries in Sheffield began to make use of Heath's patented method. The result was malleable and weldable iron and he made money selling his manganese carburet in packets. There were litigations when he altered his process and licensors refused to pay him royalty claiming that they process they were using was not what his patent stated. With support from the Madras government under Munro and he was able to prospect for magnetite in Salem and later he obtained leases to explore in Baramahal. In 1834 he received rights to obtain iron ore in Canara for 21 years. In 1838 he hired Robert Brunton who had trained in Tusey and Treveray to assist in the smelting process. Brunton brought in Foster-Avery steam engines to power the rolling machinery. The company however incurred great losses and in 1849 Heath returned to England and he died in 1851 at Sheffield. One of the factors that had been missed was the cost of fuel. Charcoal required a great deal of wood. Heath had cut down vast swathes of forest for the production of charcoal. In 1853 the Madras Government took over the loss-making factory and in 1855 it was called the East India Iron Company. In 1854, the shift of the factory to Beypore was largely made due to the lack of availability of wood for charcoal. In 1859 1000 tons of iron was shipped to Sheffield and it was used in the production of steel that went into the Britannia tubular and Menai bridges.

A factory at Palampatti was closed down in 1858. The factories at Porto Novo and Beypore closed in 1864 and the company was formally dissolved in 1874.
