= Ammapattinam =

Village in India

Coordinates: 10°01′N 79°14′E

Map

Ammapattinam is a coastal village in Pudukkottai district of Tamil Nadu, India with an exclusively Tamil Muslim population.

== Demographics ==
According to the 2011 Census:

- Total population 6,652
- Males 3,355
- Females 3, 297
- Muslims 91.48%
- Hindu 05.92%
- Christian 02.57%
- Male literacy 0%
- Female literacy 0%
- Total houses 1320
