= Parangipettai =

Parangipettai Paraṅkippēṭṭai Porto Novo
- Town Panchayath
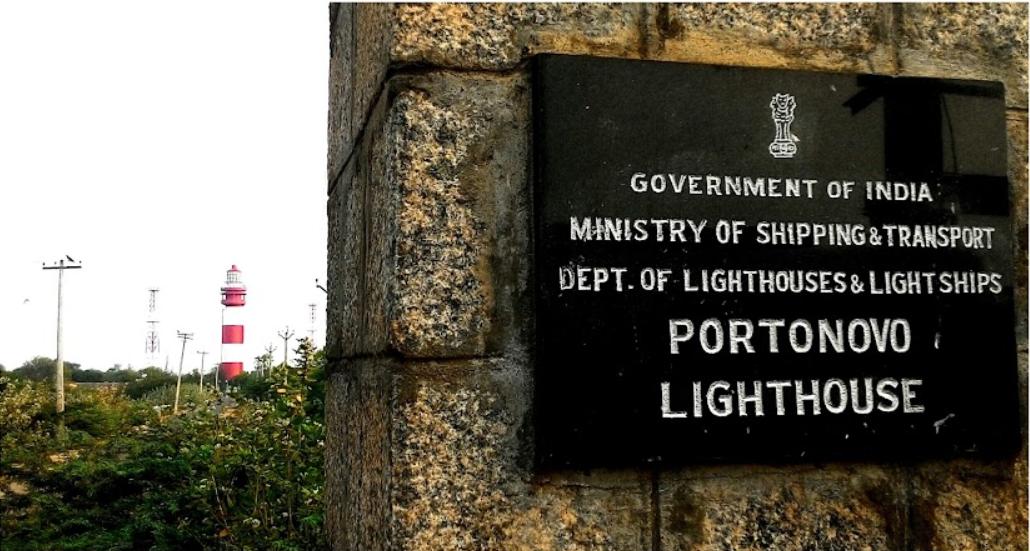
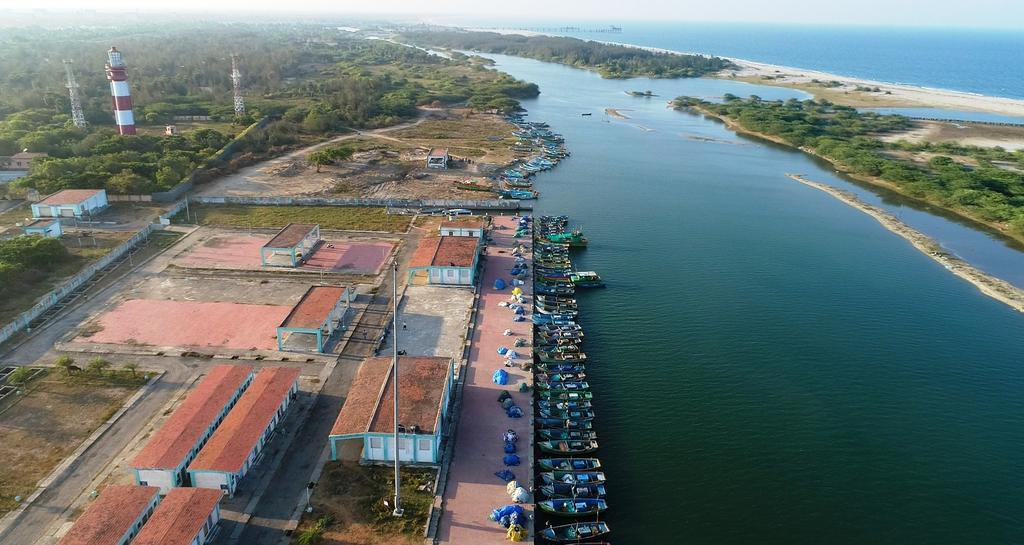
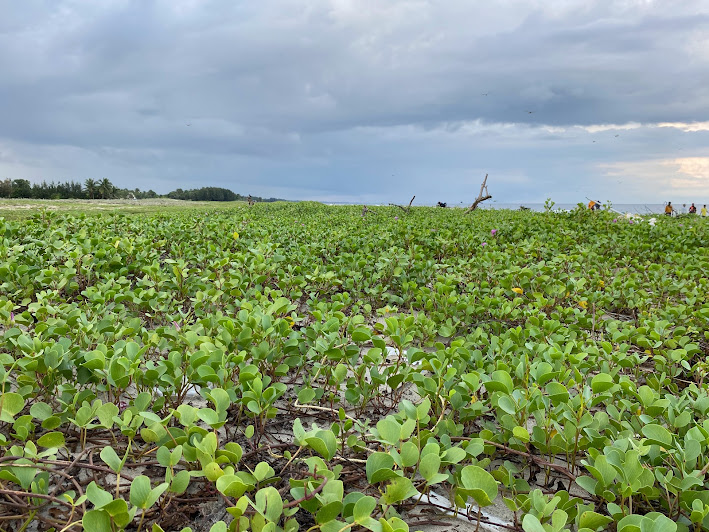
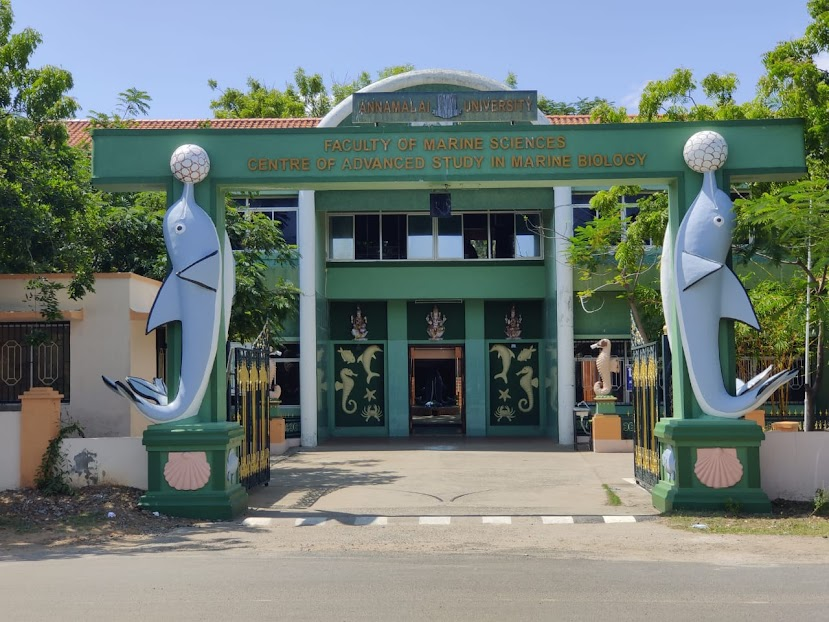
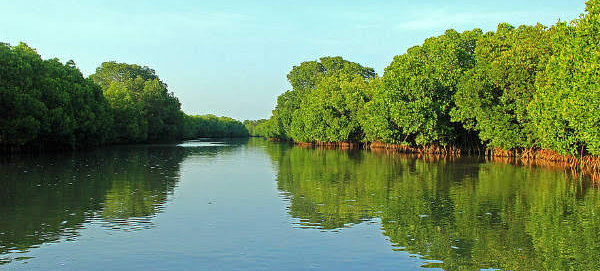
- Top: Parangipettai Lighthouse, Sea Port; Mid: Samiyarpettai Beach, CASMB; Bottom: Pichavaram Forest
- Nicknames: Mahmood Bandar, Porto Novo, Firingipet, Portonova, Varnapuri, Aadimooleswaram, Muthukrishna Puri, Vagudhai, Krishnapattinam, Krishnapuri, Krishna Poompalan Pattinam, Port Mahmooda, European Town, New Port, Excellent Port and Puthanthurai
- Interactive map of Parangipettai
- Location within Tamil Nadu
- Coordinates: 11.49°N 79.76°E
- Country: India
- State: Tamil Nadu
- District: Cuddalore
- Taluk: Bhuvanagiri
- Constituency: Chidambaram

Government
  - Type: Rural/Town
  - Body: Union Town Panchayath
  - Leader: Mrs. Thenmozhli Shankar ( DMK)
  - MLA: Mr. Thamimun Ansari ( DMK)
  - MP: Mr. Thol. Thirumavalavan ( VCK)
  - CM: Mr. C. Joseph Vijay ( TVK)
  - District Collector: Mr. Sibi Adhithya Senthil Kumar, I.A.S

Area
  - Total: 11.81 km^{2} (4.56 sq mi)
- Elevation: 12 m (39 ft)

Population (2011)
  - Total: 25,541
  - Density: 2,163/km^{2} (5,601/sq mi)
- Demonym(s): Parangiars, Novians

languages
  - Official: Tamil, English
  - Local: Tamil, English, Urudu
- Time zone: UTC+5:30 (IST)
- PIN: 608502
- Telephone code: 04144
- Website: https://parangipettai.com

Parangipettai (/pərəŋɡɪˈpeɪtaɪ/, Tamil: [paɾaŋɡipːeːʈɐi̯]), historically called Porto Novo ("New Port" in Portuguese), is a coastal panchayat town in Cuddalore district in the Indian state of Tamil Nadu. Parangipettai is located on the north bank of the mouth of the Vellar River at a distance of 30 km from Cuddalore. From the state capital city of Chennai, Parangipettai can be reached through the National Highway NH32 stretch between Cuddalore and Chidambaram.

Its strategic location on the Coromandel Coast has long made it a major trading center. In particular, it was an important trading destination for the Arabs, especially the Yemenis. During the colonial era, the Portuguese, the Dutch, the Swedes and the English successively colonized the area.

There is also a Gandhian connection to Parangipettai. Anne Marie Petersen became in 1909 a missionary in the so-called Loventhal Mission. The foundation stone was laid by Mahatma Gandhi himself in 1921, and a few years later, the school was officially opened under the name Seva Mandir at a place called Porto Novo, near Chidambaram, in Tamil Nadu, South India.

Today, Parangipettai has evolved into a well-developed town with nearly all necessities such as healthcare, education and transport. It also hosts a marine biology station that is affiliated with the Annamalai University.

The town is an important pilgrimage center for Muslims and Hindus.

== Etymology ==
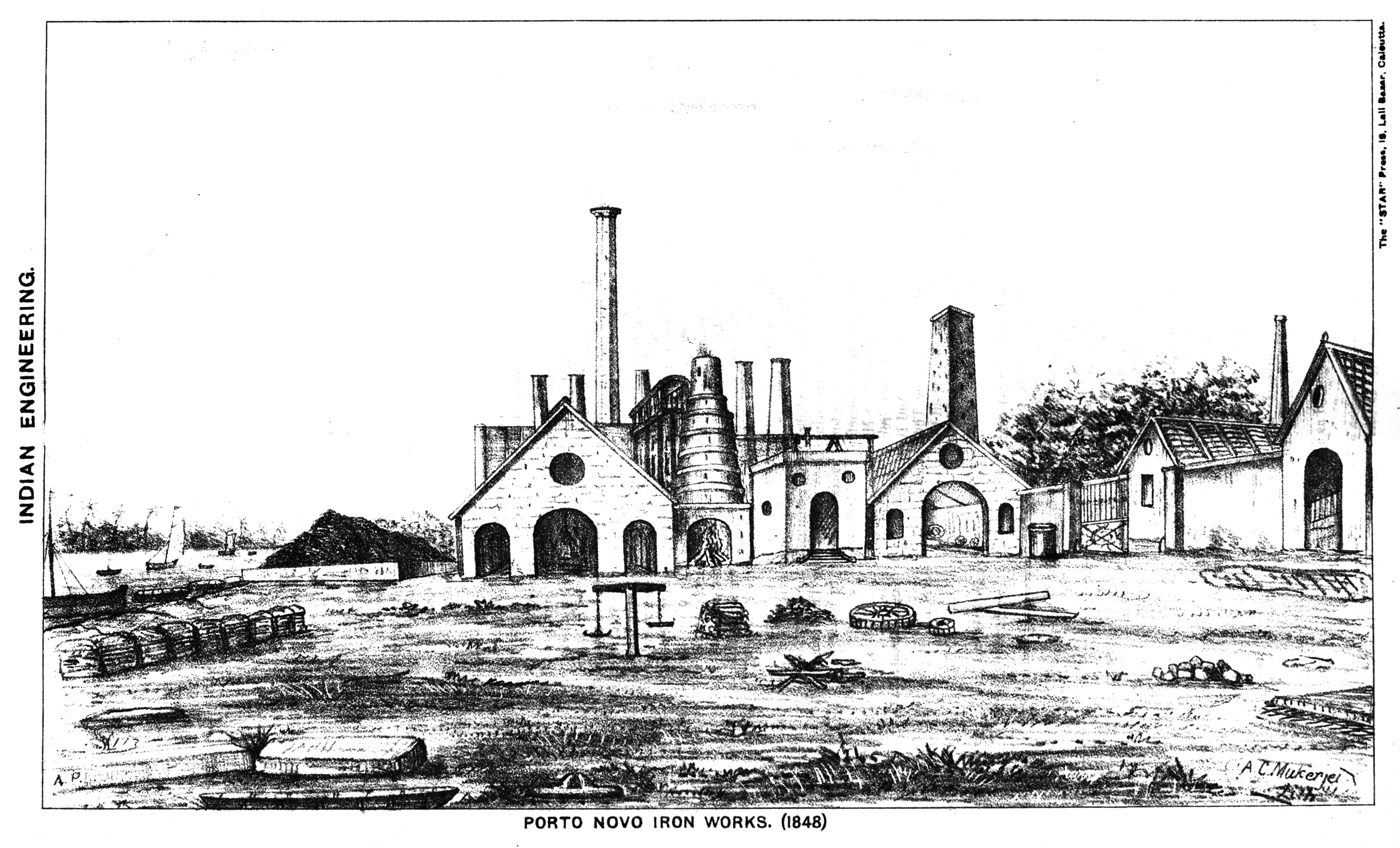
Porto Novo Iron Works, 1848

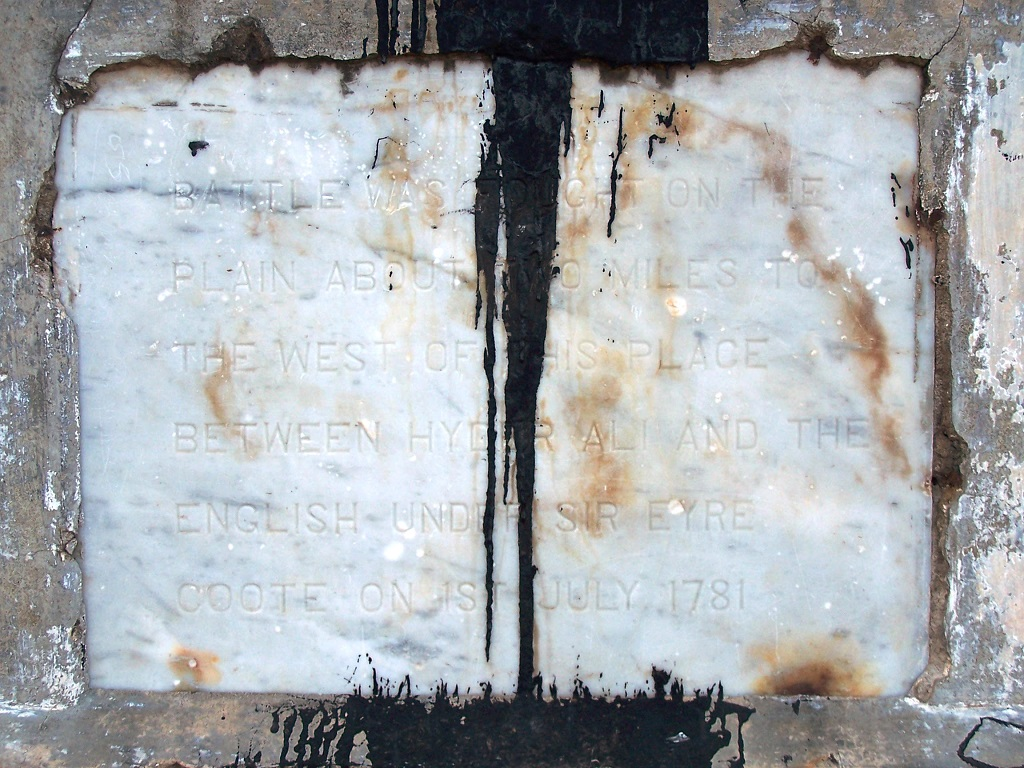
Memorial for the Battle of Porto Novo, 1781 at Porto Novo

In Tamil the word parangiar refers to Europeans, and pettai means place. Thus Parangipettai translates to the "abode of the parangiars or Europeans" in Tamil.

== History ==
It maintained trading links of silk and chintz fabrics with Aceh from August–September to April as late when weather was at its most fair.

In 1733, the Swedish East India Company established a factory in Porto Novo though after a month it was seized and dismantled in a joint operation by the British and French East India companies.

On December 25th, 1740, 500 Maratha horseman captured the Dutch fort of Portnovo and the Dutch Deputy Governor, his wife, and children

The town flourished as a seaport with connections to southeast Asia and as an industrial center during British rule, when iron made here was exported to England. The powerful Nawabs of Arcot had his mint at Porto Novo and the gold coins struck in this mint came to be called the Porto Novo Pagoda. Later the English followed the same design when they minted the 'Negapatam' (Nagapatnam) Pagoda; the Dutch minted their coin in the same design at Tuticorin and Colombo mints.

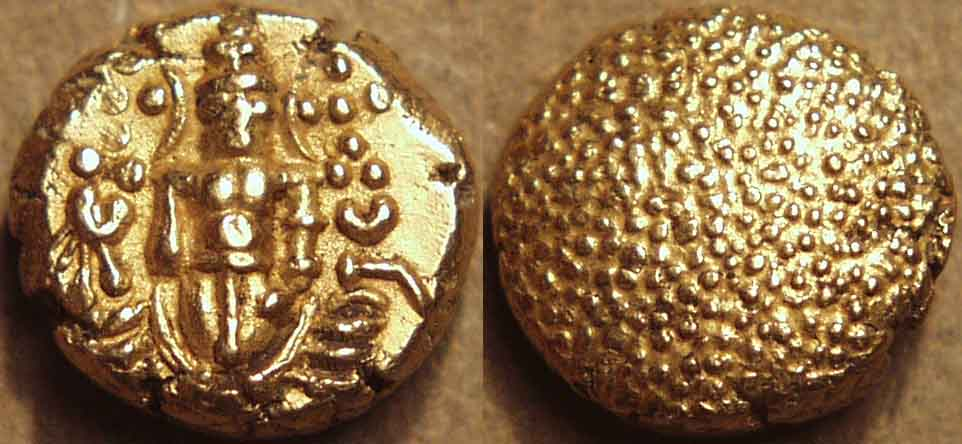

== Climate ==
The Parangipettai has heavy rainfall during the northeast monsoon. The total annual rainfall usually ranges between 1,200 and 1,400 mm. This place is still known for its frequent rainfall. "Parangipettai in Tamil Nadu became the rainiest city in India with 168 mm of rainfall," says Skymet Weather. In November 2023, Parangingipettai was second place in District rainfall recorded with 119.5 mm in 24h.

Climate data for Parangipettai (Porto Novo) 1981–2010, extremes 1968–2011
Month	Jan	Feb	Mar	Apr	May	Jun	Jul	Aug	Sep	Oct	Nov	Dec	Year
Record high °C (°F)	33.0 (91.4)	35.5 (95.9)	39.9 (103.8)	41.5 (106.7)	43.5 (110.3)	42.5 (108.5)	40.5 (104.9)	39.5 (103.1)	46.0 (114.8)	38.0 (100.4)	37.3 (99.1)	36.4 (97.5)	46.0 (114.8)
Mean daily maximum °C (°F)	29.2 (84.6)	30.3 (86.5)	32.3 (90.1)	34.7 (94.5)	37.3 (99.1)	37.5 (99.5)	36.1 (97.0)	35.4 (95.7)	34.4 (93.9)	32.3 (90.1)	29.8 (85.6)	29.0 (84.2)	33.2 (91.8)
Mean daily minimum °C (°F)	20.6 (69.1)	21.1 (70.0)	23.0 (73.4)	25.3 (77.5)	26.2 (79.2)	26.1 (79.0)	25.3 (77.5)	24.8 (76.6)	24.6 (76.3)	24.0 (75.2)	22.7 (72.9)	21.4 (70.5)	23.8 (74.8)
Record low °C (°F)	14.0 (57.2)	14.0 (57.2)	17.8 (64.0)	18.8 (65.8)	19.0 (66.2)	19.3 (66.7)	18.7 (65.7)	18.6 (65.5)	17.8 (64.0)	17.0 (62.6)	16.5 (61.7)	14.5 (58.1)	14.0 (57.2)
Average rainfall mm (inches)	39.1 (1.54)	42.1 (1.66)	32.4 (1.28)	17.9 (0.70)	37.8 (1.49)	43.0 (1.69)	65.4 (2.57)	87.9 (3.46)	118.0 (4.65)	259.4 (10.21)	433.0 (17.05)	238.6 (9.39)	1,414.5 (55.69)
Average rainy days	1.9	1.4	0.4	0.8	1.5	2.8	3.9	4.8	5.1	9.5	11.5	6.4	50.0
Average relative humidity (%) (at 17:30 IST)	76	75	75	74	70	61	63	66	71	77	81	78	72
Source: India Meteorological Department

== Religion ==
Religions in Parangipettai (2011)
1. Hinduism (56.3%)
2. Islam (42.7%)
3. Christianity (0.47%)
4. Jain (0.07%)
5. Other or not stated (0.43%)

In Parangipettai, various faiths live together in relative peace. Muslims and Hindus reside in the town in nearly equal numbers. Christians also live here. Among the Muslims are clans or family groups, but they necessarily affect social interactions like marriages and mutual living. Some of the Muslims are the Maraicars, Sahibs, Ravuthtars and Pattans. The most common ones are Maraicar. Maraicar the name faded claims to have derived from the old Tamil term 'Marakkalangalin aayargal' meaning 'Kings of Boats', a title said to be given by the Southern Tamil Hindu King Vijaya Raghunadha Sedhupathy Thondamaan (King Sethu) to the Arab traders from parts of Shia Yemen and Sunni Arabia, now Saudi Arabia, who and were the reigning members of coastal trade with those regions.

At 2011 census, Parangipettai had a population of 1,10,073, with males constituting 50.23% of the population and females 49.77%.

It has a religious practice Hinduism average of 56.34%, at second place Islam average of 42.69%, then Christianity average is 0.47%, Jainism is 0.07% and others or not stated 0.43%.

== Demographics ==
Population of Parangipettai 1871 - 2011
Census Year	No. of Village Panchayats	Total Population	Total Male	Total Female	Under 6 years of Age
1871	T	7,182	*	*	*
1881	T	7,823	3,122	4,701	*
1891	T	14,061	6,190	7,871	*
1901	T	13,712	5,957	7,755	*
1911	T	15,804	7,232	8,572	*
1921	T	12,940	6,021	6,019	*
1931	T	13,762	6,329	7,433	~1,820
1941	T	14,145	6,624	7,521	*
1951	TP	15,084	6,874	8,210	*
1961	TP	15,139	7,078	8,061	*
1971	TP	17,412	7,917	9,495	*
1981	TP	20,100	9,079	11.021	*
1991	TP	23,550	10,890	12,660	2,716
2001	57	20,901	10,178	10,723	2,457
2011	41	25,541	12,733	12,808	3,022
Source: Census of India & Directorate of Census Operations of Tamil Nadu

=== At 2001 Census ===
Parangipettai had a population of 20,901, with males constituting 49% of the population and females 51%. In Parangipettai, 12% of the population is under 6 years of age. Parangipettai has an average literacy rate of 75%, higher than the national average of 59.5%: male literacy is 81%, and female literacy is 69%.

=== At 2011 Census ===
Parangipettai had a population of 1,10,073, with males constituting 50.23% of the population and females 49.77%. In Parangipettai, 11.25% of the population is under 6 years of age.

Parangipettai has an average literacy rate of 70.45%, Lower than the national average of 73.5%: male literacy is 76.21%, and female literacy is 64.64%.

Population and growth rate of the Parangipettai Town Panchayat
Year	Population (% change from prior Census)
1871	7,182
1881	7,823(+8.9%)
1891	14,061(+79.7%)
1901	13,712(-2.4%)
1911	15,804(+15.3%)
1921	12,940(-18.1%)
1931	13,762(+6.4%)
1941	14,175(+3.0%)
1951	15,084(+6.4%)
1961	15,139(+0.4%)
1971	17,412(+15.0%)
1981	20,100(+15.4%)
1991	23,550(+17.2%)
2001	20,912(-11.2%)
2011	25,541(+12.2%)

Census	Literacy rate						Illiteracy rate					
Year	Average Literate	Total Literate	Male	Female	No. of Male	No. of Female	Average Illiterate	Total Illiterate	Male	Female	No. of Male	No. of Female
1991	64.23%	15,128	72.23%	57.36%	7,866	7,262	35.77%	8,422	27.77%	42.64%	3,024	5,398
2001	74.88%	15,651	80.92%	69.15%	8,236	7,415	25.12%	5,250	19.08%	30.85%	1,942	3,308
2011	77.71%	19,850	80.92%	74.53%	10,304	9,546	22.29%	5,691	19.08%	25.47%	2,429	3,262
Source: Census of India

== Economy ==
The production of a kind of extremely soft mat by Labbai's women, which is used for sleeping and as a hold-all for clothing and bedding, is the sole notable in Porto Novo. These are produced from the screw-pine (Pandanus odoratissimus) leaves are claimed to be copies of those formerly manufactured in Achin. even though it is generally accepted that their original quality has been much excelled in both color and texture.

== Transport ==
=== Railways ===
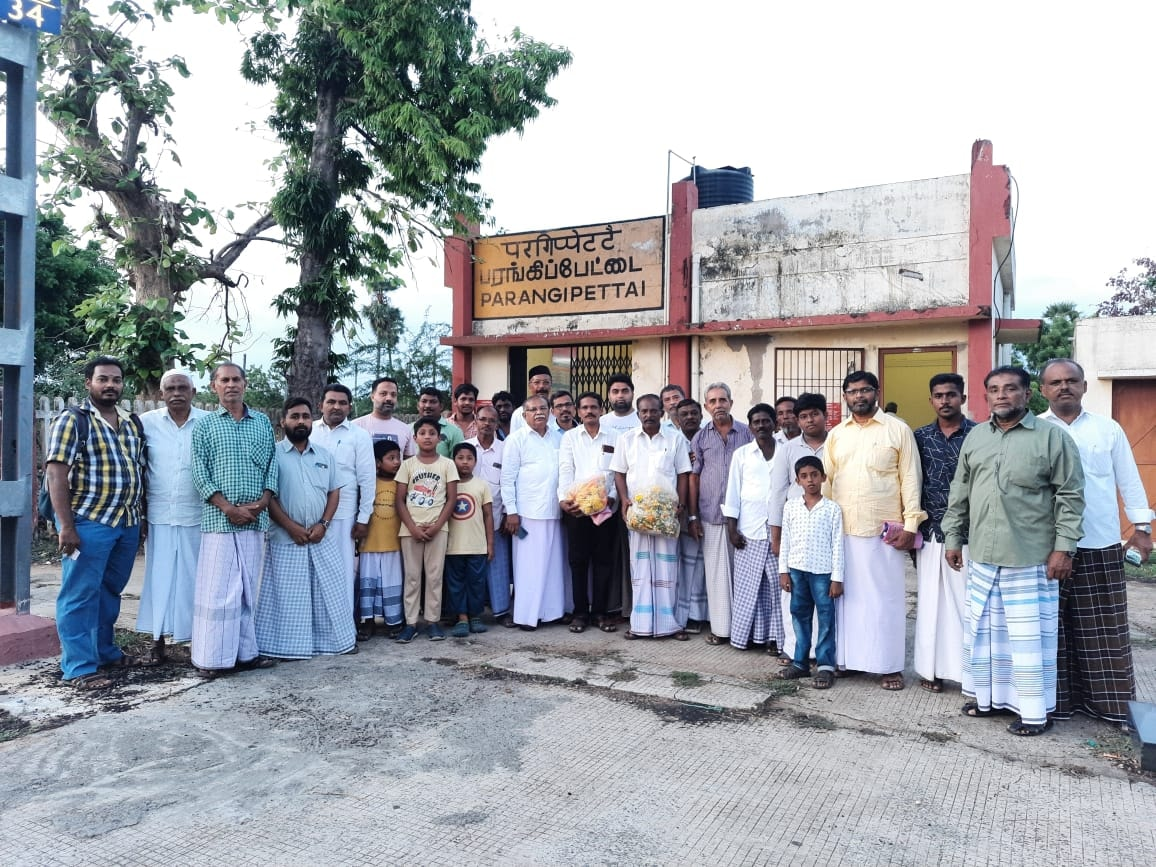
To welcome new train stoppage at Parangipettai Railway Station

Parangipettai railway station (Code: PO) is a Very Important Station Historically and Economically. During the British rule in Parangipettai and about 15 years after the independence of the country, the railway transport was good. After the modernization of transport facilities, Parangipettai was left very backwards.

After conversion to broad gauge, only 6 trains bound for Villupuram and Mayiladuthurai, in addition to two for Bangalore - Karaikal, a total of 8 trains stop at Parangipettai. Not one of the more than 60 express trains that pass through Parangipettai stops here.

=== Ship ===
This port carries on a busy trade with Ceylon, Acheng, Penang and Singapore. Steamers of the British India Steam Navigation Company (BISN) anchor 2 miles offshore in 4 1/2 to 5 feet of water and sail to Singapore once a fortnight. Goods are shipped and landed at the Government Jetty opposite the Custom House, where about twenty boats are available.

== Notable sites ==
- Portonovo Lighthouse
- Porto Novo War Memorial
- Pichavaram Mangrove Forest
- Samiyarpettai Beach
- Porto Novo Iron Works
- Portonovo Lighthouse

=== Hyder Ali War location ===
The Battle of Porto Novo was fought on 1 July 1781 between forces of the Kingdom of Mysore and British East India Company in the place called Porto Novo (now known as Parangipettai) on the Indian subcontinent, during the Second Anglo-Mysore War. The British force, numbering more than 8,000 men under the command of Sir Eyre Coote defeated a force estimated at 40,000 under the command of Hyder Ali.

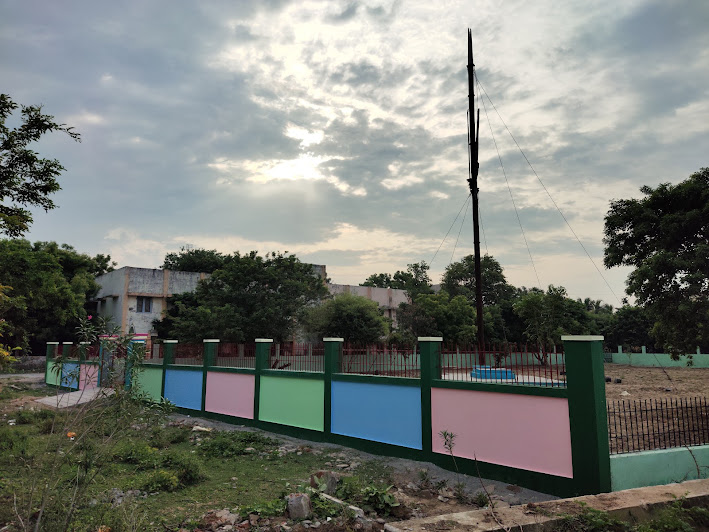
The Battle of Porto Novo
