= Prong's Lighthouse =

Indian lighthouse at Mumbai Harbour

Prong’s Lighthouse Colaba Point
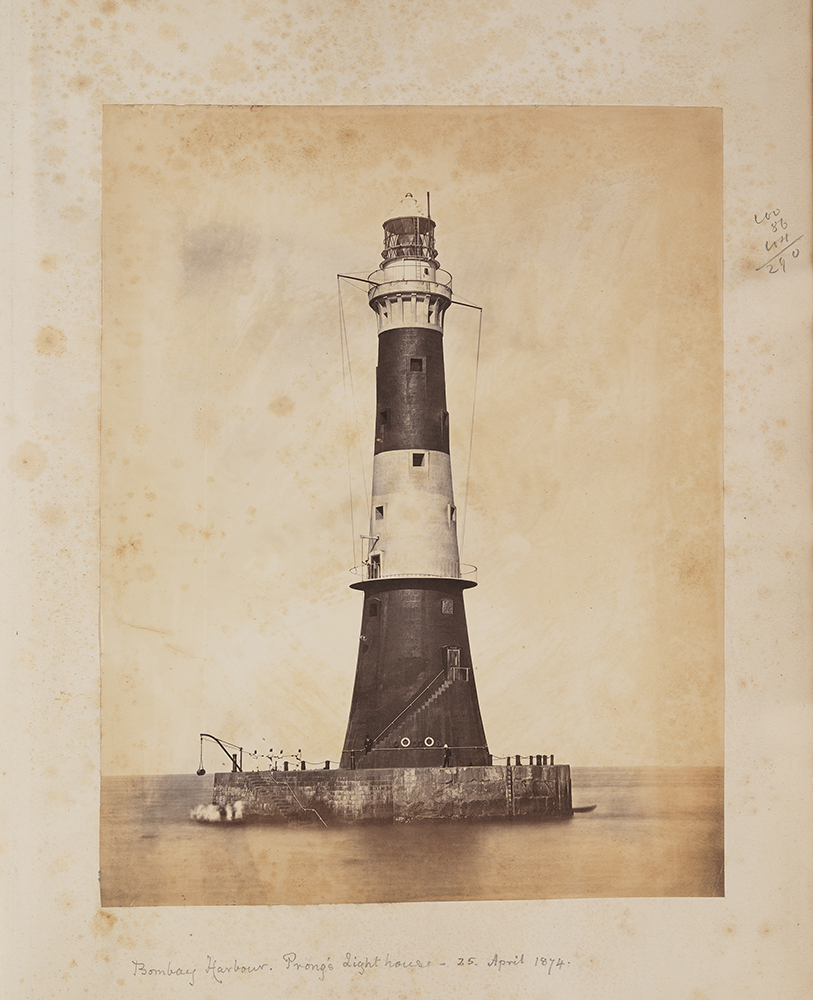
- Photo of the lighthouse taken on 5 April 1874.
- Location: Mumbai, India
- Coordinates: 18.879238°N 72.799750°E

Tower
- Constructed: 1844 (first)
- Construction: stone tower
- Height: 41 metres (135 ft)
- Shape: tapered cylindrical tower with double balcony and lantern
- Markings: black basement, white tower with a horizontal red band, white lantern
- Operator: Mumbai Port Trust

Light
- First lit: 1871 (current)
- Focal height: 41 metres (135 ft)
- Lens: 1st order Fresnel lens
- Range: 23 nautical miles (43 km; 26 mi)
- Characteristic: Fl W 10s.

Prong's Lighthouse is an offshore lighthouse situated at the southernmost point of Bombay (present-day Mumbai), India in the Colaba (Navy Nagar) area. It marks the entrance to Mumbai Harbour. The lighthouse is a Grade-I heritage structure.

== History ==
During the 18th century, with an increase in the number of shipwrecks in the Bombay harbour region, a need for a lighthouse was met by modifying an onshore watch tower, built by the Portuguese, into the first lighthouse by British port authorities. This was known as the Colaba Point Lighthouse.

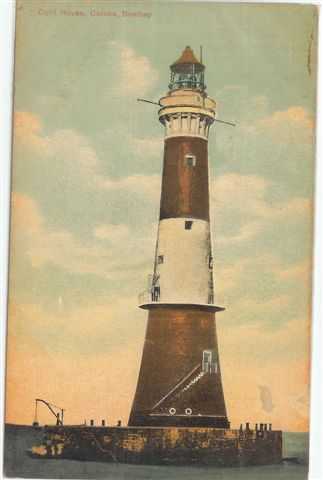
Old postcard of the Prong's Lighthouse

The Prong's Lighthouse was built later, in 1875, by Thomas Ormiston at the cost of Rs. 620,255. The lighthouse had a cannon during the British rule, to secure the bay. Once the Prong's Lighthouse was completed and commissioned, the older Colaba Point Lighthouse was rendered obsolete and it was demolished and no trace of it remains today.

== Description ==
The tapering 44 metres (144 ft) high circular stone tower has a 23 metres (75 ft) range and a beam that can be seen at a distance of 30 kilometres (19 mi). The tower is painted in three horizontal bands, red, white, and black respectively. It displays a white light, flashing every ten seconds.

The Prongs Reef Lighthouse is equipped with a traditional first-order optical system, originally installed in 1875 and manufactured by Chance Brothers, Birmingham. The lighthouse currently operates with an 85 mm petroleum vapour (PV) burner, which replaced the earlier 55 mm version in 1912 and remains functional today. The lantern emits a steady white light, visible for a significant nautical range, although precise range values are not recorded in the provided material. The structure is mounted offshore on a reef, making it one of the few classic reef lighthouses in India still using manually serviced flame-based illumination. The lighthouse is not equipped with modern radar beacons (RACON) or AIS base stations, and it lacks automation or satellite connectivity, functioning as a heritage navigational aid with minimal technological upgrades since its original commissioning.

== Staffing ==
The Prong's Lighthouse is one of the few offshore lighthouses in the world that are still staffed. It is maintained by the Directorate General of Lighthouses and Lightships, that comes under the Ministry of Ports, Shipping and Waterways. The lighthouse has restricted access as it is in a military area. It is accessible during low tide by foot and during high tide by boat, with special permission from the Indian Navy and the Mumbai Port Trust.

== Heritage designation ==
The lighthouse is one of the three lighthouses in the Mumbai Harbour. The other two lighthouses include the Dolphin Lighthouse and the Sunk Rock Lighthouse.

The lighthouse (and the mangrove area extended between it and Colaba point) was designated a Grade-I heritage structure by the Brihanmumbai Municipal Corporation (MCGM) basis the recommendations of the Mumbai Heritage Conservation Committee.

== See also ==
- List of lighthouses in India
- The lighthouses of Mumbai harbour - Timestravel Article
