= List of lighthouses in India =

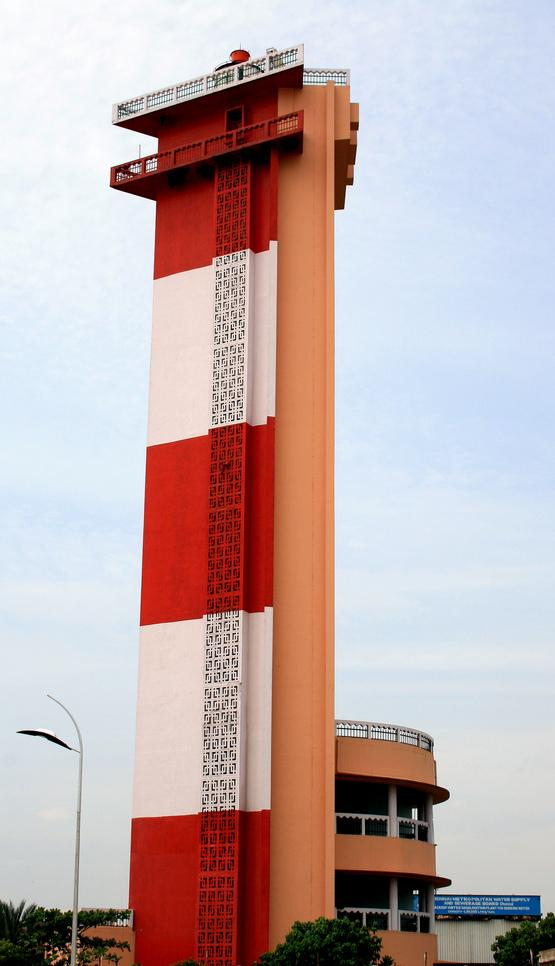
Lighthouse, Chennai

There are many lighthouses along the long coastline of India and in the associated islands. They are administered by the Directorate General of Lighthouses and Lightships, Government of India whose headoffice is located in Noida.

They are categorized for administrative reasons into nine directorates: Gandhidham, Jamnagar, Mumbai, Goa, Cochin, Chennai, Visakhapatnam, Kolkata and Port Blair.

== Gandhidham directorate ==
Office located in Gandhidham:

- Kandla
- Bhadreshwar
- Balachhadi
- Navalakhi
- Chhachhi
- Harudi
- Jakhau
- Narayan Sarovar (Koteshwar)
- Vanku
- Chudeshwar
- Mundra (Navinal)
- Mandvi
- Okha

== Jamnagar directorate ==
Office located in Jamnagar:

- Alang
- Bhirbhanjan Veraval
- Bural
- Chank
- Daman, India
- Diu-Head
- Dwaraka
- Ghogha
- Gopnath Bhavnagar
- Jafrabad
- Jegri
- Jodiya
- Mangrol
- Jhanjhmer
- Kachhighadh
- Kalubhar
- Mawadi
- Mungra
- Navadra
- Navi Bandar
- Piram Island
- Pirotan Island
- Porbandar
- Preigee Main Lightship
- Ruvapari
- Saiyad Rajapara
- Savaibet
- Simar
- Veraval Lighthouse

== Mumbai directorate ==
Office located in Mumbai:

- Arnala
- Chaul Kadu
- Devgarh
- Hazira, Surat
- Jaigarh Head, Ratnagiri
- Kanai Creek
- Kanhoji Angre Island
- Korlai, Korlai Fort
- Luhara (formerly Broach Point)
- Honnavar
- Malpe
- Nanwel
- Prong's Lighthouse, Mumbai
- Ratnagiri
- Satpati
- St. George Island
- Tarapur
- Tolkeshwar point
- Uttan
- Khadi, Valsad
- Wagapur Point
- Wasi Borsi, Navsari

Mumbai Harbour

- Dolphin Lighthouse, Mumbai
- Sunk Rock Lighthouse, Mumbai

== Goa directorate ==
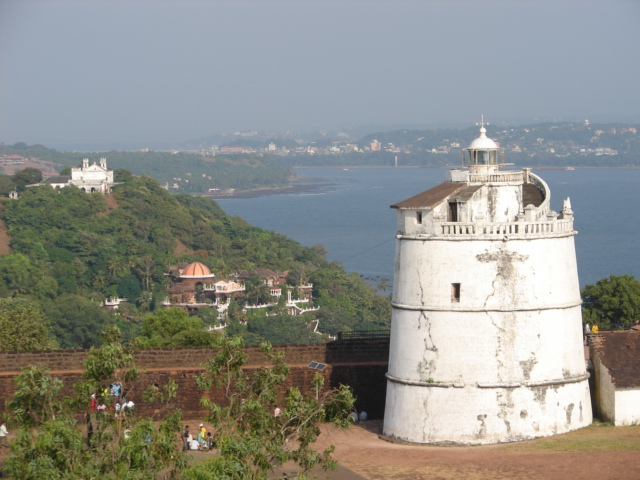
Fort Aguada Lighthouse, Goa

Office located in Goa:

- Aguada, Fort Aguada, Goa
- Suratkal point
- Honavar
- Betul
- Kap (Kaup)
- Bhatkal
- Vengurla Point
- Vengurla Rocks
- Oyster Rock Lighthouse, Karwar
- Kundapura
- Tadri

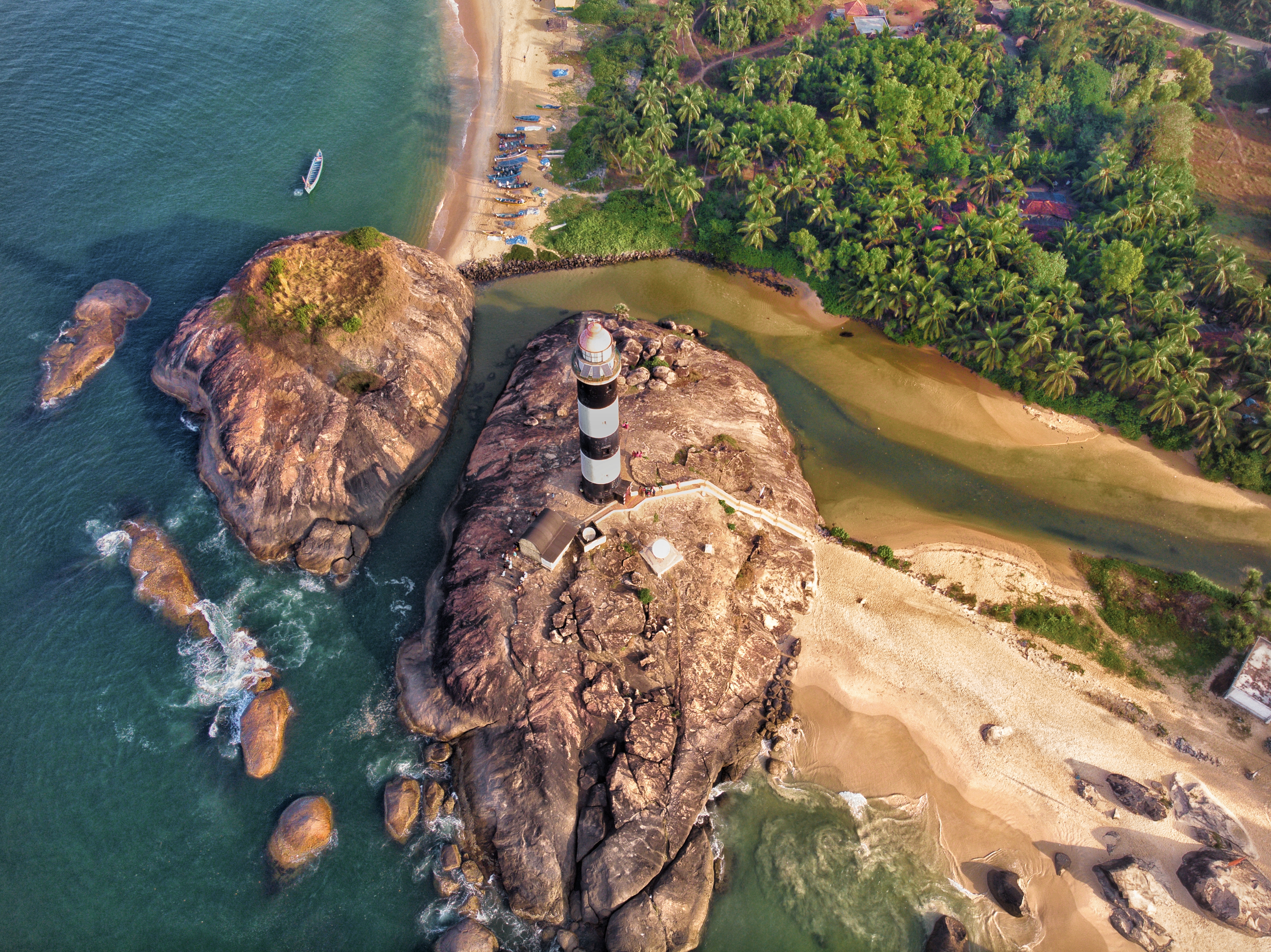
Kapu Beach Lighthouse

== Cochin directorate ==
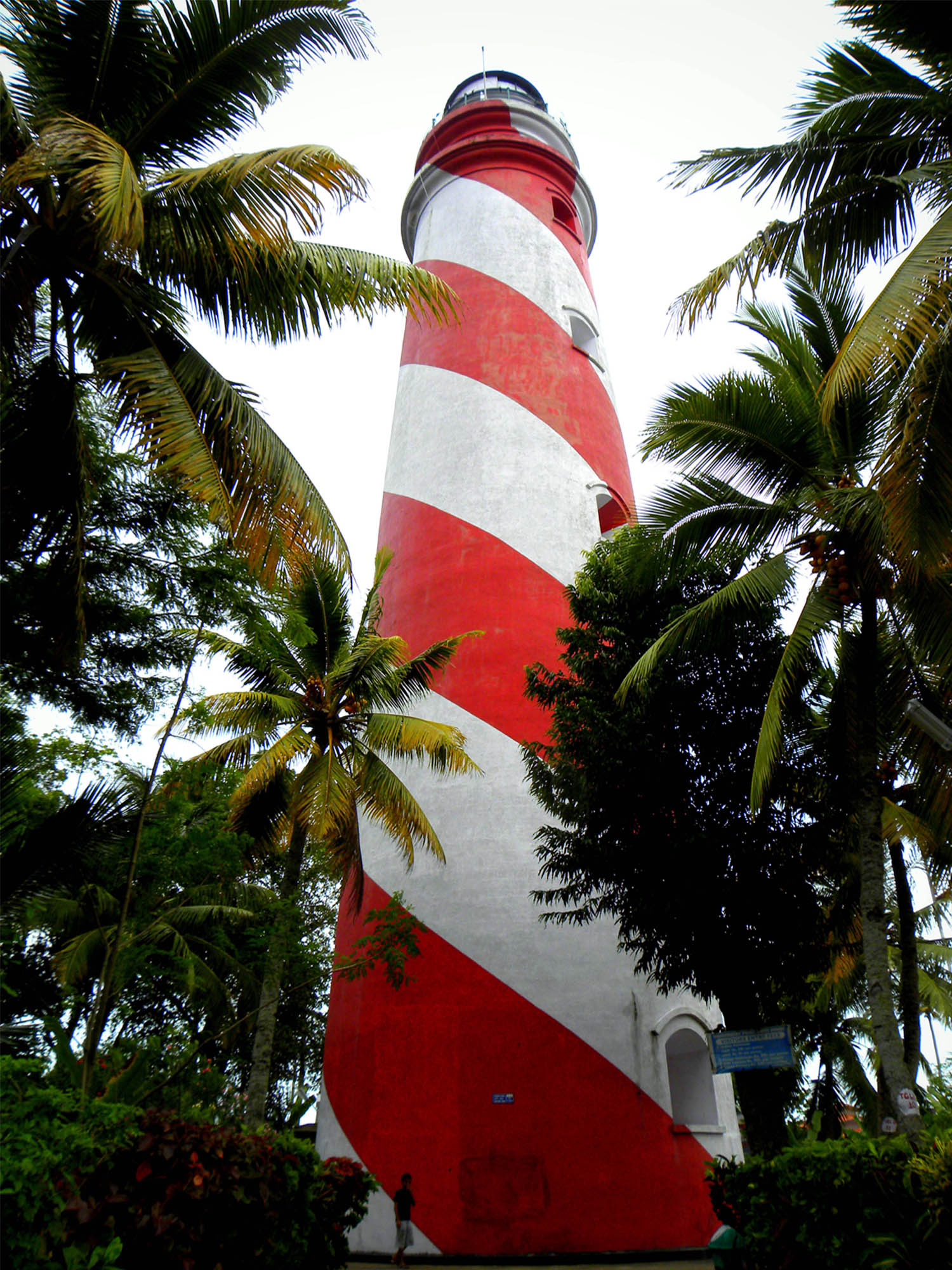
Tangasseri Lighthouse in Kollam city

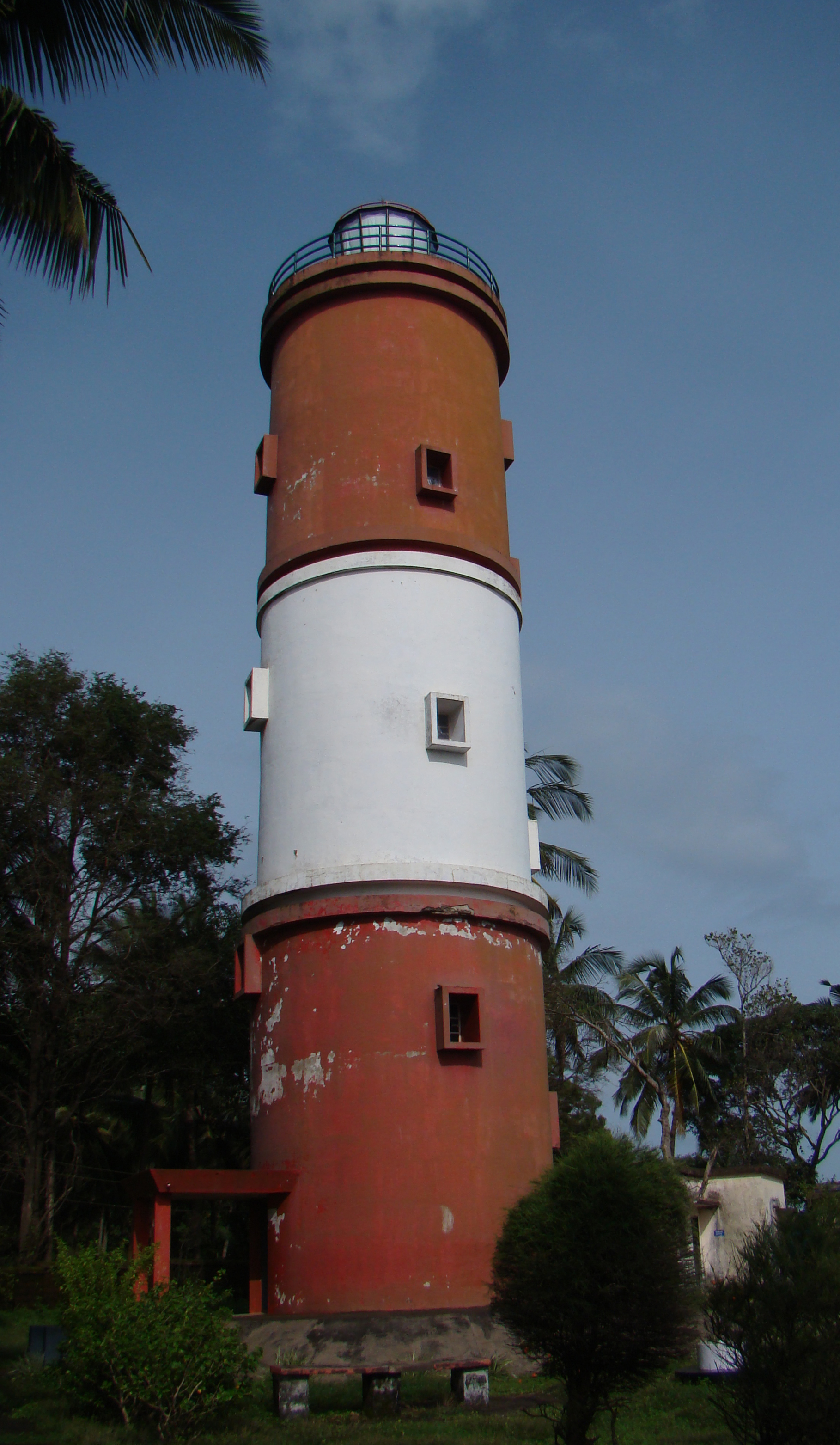
Cannanore Lighthouse, Kannur

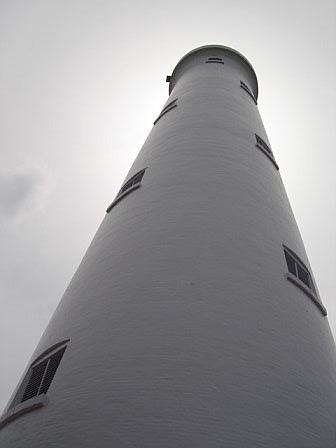
Worms eye view of the lighthouse on Minicoy

Office located in Cochin:

- Agatti
- Alleppey (Alappuzha Lighthouse, Alappuzha)
- Amini
- Androth-East
- Androth-West
- Azhikode Lighthouse
- Beypore Lighthouse
- Bitra Island, Lakshadweep
- Cannanore
- Chetlat Island, Lakshadweep
- Chetwai Lighthouse
- Kadalur Point Lighthouse
- Kadamath
- Kalpeni
- Kasaragod Lighthouse
- Kavaratti Island, Lakshadweep
- Kiltan North, Kiltan Island, Lakshadweep
- Kiltan South
- Manakkodam Lighthouse, Andhakaranazhy
- Minicoy North, Minicoy Island Lighthouse, Lakshadweep
- Minicoy South
- Mount Dilly Lighthouse, Kannur
- Ponnani Lighthouse
- Suhelipar
- Thinnakara
- Valiyakara
- Vypin or Cochin
- Anjengo Lighthouse, Anjengo, Trivandrum
- Kovilthottam Lighthouse, Chavara, Kollam
- Vizhinjam Lighthouse, Trivandrum
- Tangasseri Lighthouse, Kollam

Others

- Kovalam Lighthouse, Trivandrum
- Karwar
- Ezhimala Lighthouse, Payyannur, Kannur
- Kozhikode Lighthouse, Kozhikode
- Light House Hill, Mangalore, Karnataka
- Tellicherry Lighthouse, Thalassery

== Chennai directorate ==
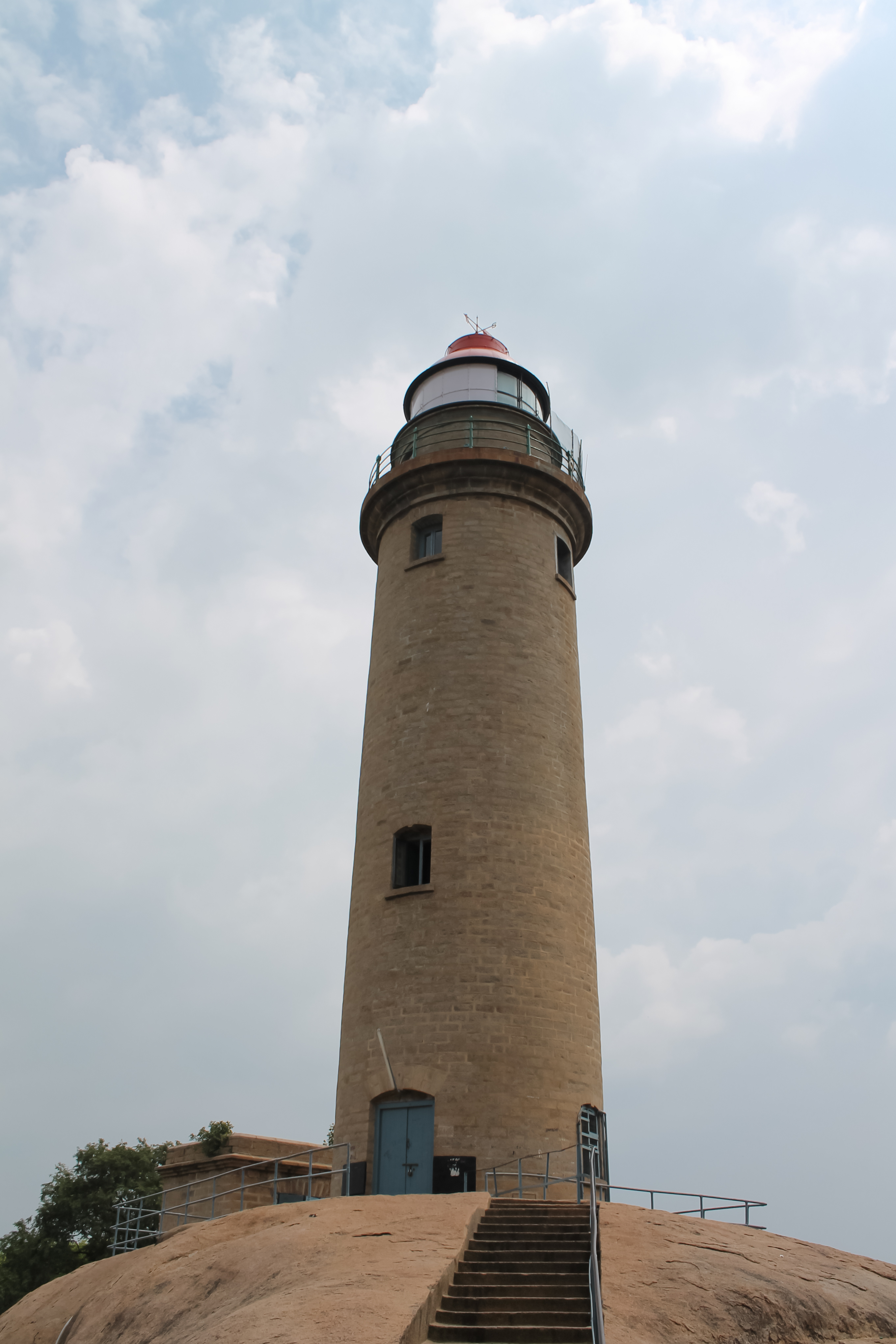
Mahabalipuram Lighthouse

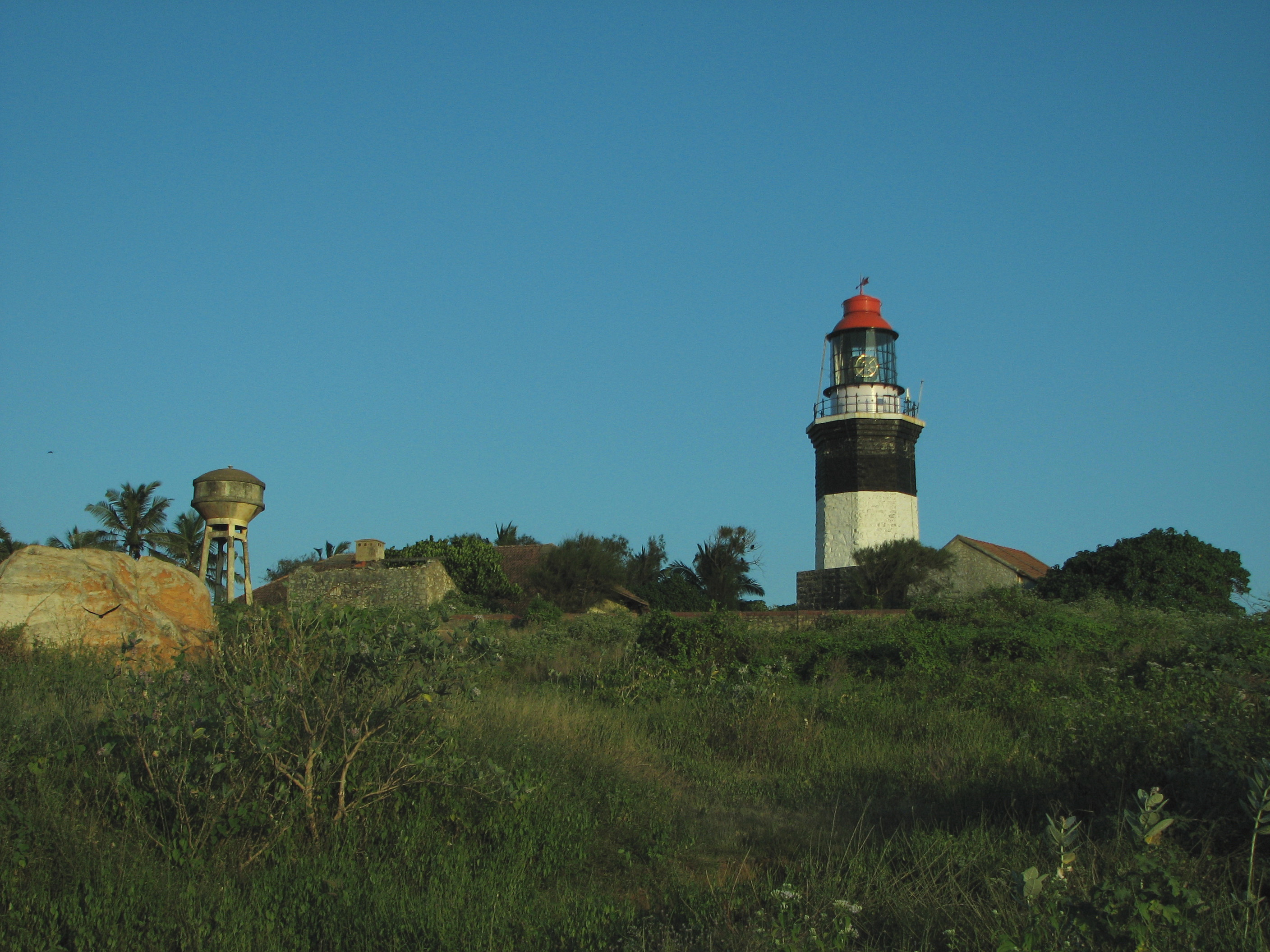
Muttom Lighthouse

Office located in Chennai:

- Kaniyakumari Lighthouse
- Pulicat Lighthouse
- Mahabalipuram Lighthouse
- Portonovo Lighthouse
- Nagapattinam Lighthouse
- Point Calimere Lighthouse
- Kodikkarai Lighthouse
- Mallipattinam Lighthouse
- Passipatnam Lighthouse
- Rameswaram Lighthouse
- Pamban Island Lighthouse
- Kadappakam
- Pandiyan Tivu Lighthouse, Tuticorin
- Manapad Lighthouse
- Ammapattinam Lighthouse
- Kilakarai Lighthouse
- Vembar Lighthouse
- Kovilthottam Lighthouse, Kollam
- Chennai Lighthouse
- Pondicherry Lighthouse, Puducherry
- Cuddalore
- Poompuhar
- Karaikal
- Olakkuda
- Muttom point

Others

- Cape Comorin

== Visakhapatnam directorate ==
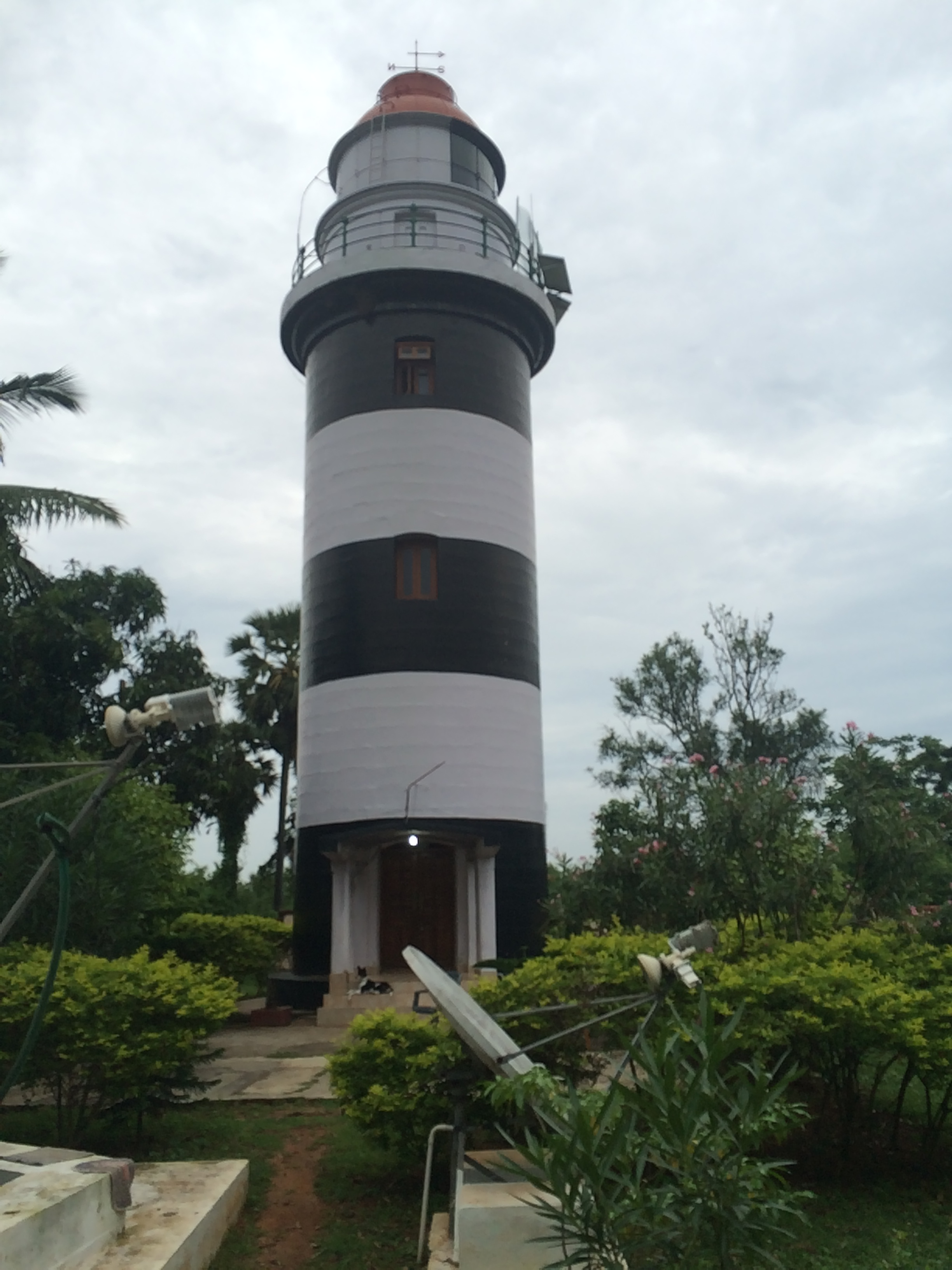
Santapille Lighthouse

Office located in Visakhapatnam:

- Santapille Lighthouse, Chintapalli
- Bheemunipatnam
- Dolphin's Nose, Visakhapatnam
- Pudimadaka
- Pentakota
- Vakalapudi, Kakinada
- Sacramento Lighthouse, Bojjavaripeta
- Ramayapatnam
- Antervedi
- Machilipatnam
- Nagayalanka
- Nizampatnam
- Vodarevu
- Iskapalli
- Krishnapatnam
- Armagon
- Ravaport

== Kolkata directorate ==
- Baruva
- Chandrabhaga Lighthouse, Konark
- Dariapur Lighthouse, Contai
- False Point at Kendrapara district of Odisha
- Gopalpur-on-Sea Lighthouse at Gopalpur, Odisha
- Kalingapatnam
- Paradip Lighthouse, Paradip
- Prayagi
- Puri Lighthouse
- Saugor

Others

- Digha
- Sagar Island
- Tajpur lighthouse, West Bengal

== Port Blair directorate ==
Office located in Port Blair:

- Andaman Strait Eastern Entrance Lighthouse, Baratang
- Awes Island Lighthouse, near Mayabunder
- Battimalv Lighthouse, Car Nicobar
- Bompoka, near Teressa (Nicobar Islands)
- Cape Connaught Lighthouse, Nancowry Island
- Chidiya Tapu Lighthouse, South Andaman Island
- Chowra island, near Nancowry Island, Nicobar Islands
- East Island Lighthouse, Diglipur, North Andaman Island
- Indira Point, Great Nicobar Island
- Interview Island, Andaman Islands
- Kabra Island, Nicobar Islands
- Katchal Island West Bay
- Katchal East Bay Lighthouse
- Keating Point Lighthouse, Car Nicobar
- Little Andaman
- Menchal Island, Nicobar Islands
- Middle Button Island, Ritchie's Archipelago
- Narcondam Island, Andaman Islands
- North Brother Island
- North Button Island, Ritchie's Archipelago
- North Cinque Island
- North Point Lighthouse, Port Blair
- Port Cornwallis Lighthouse, Ross Island
- Pulo Milo, Nicobar Islands
- Rosen Point Lighthouse, near Campbell Bay
- Rutland Island
- Sir Hugh Rose Island, Ritchie's Archipelago
- South Button Island, Ritchie's Archipelago
- South Sentinel Island, Andaman Islands
- Strait Island
- Tillanchang Lighthouse, Nicobar Islands
- Wilson Island, Ritchie's Archipelago

Others

- Barren Island, Andaman Islands
- Havelock Island Lighthouse, Havelock Island

== See also ==
- Lists of lighthouses and lightvessels
