= Kozhikkode Lighthouse =

Lighthouse in Kerala, India

Kozhikkode Lighthouse Calicut
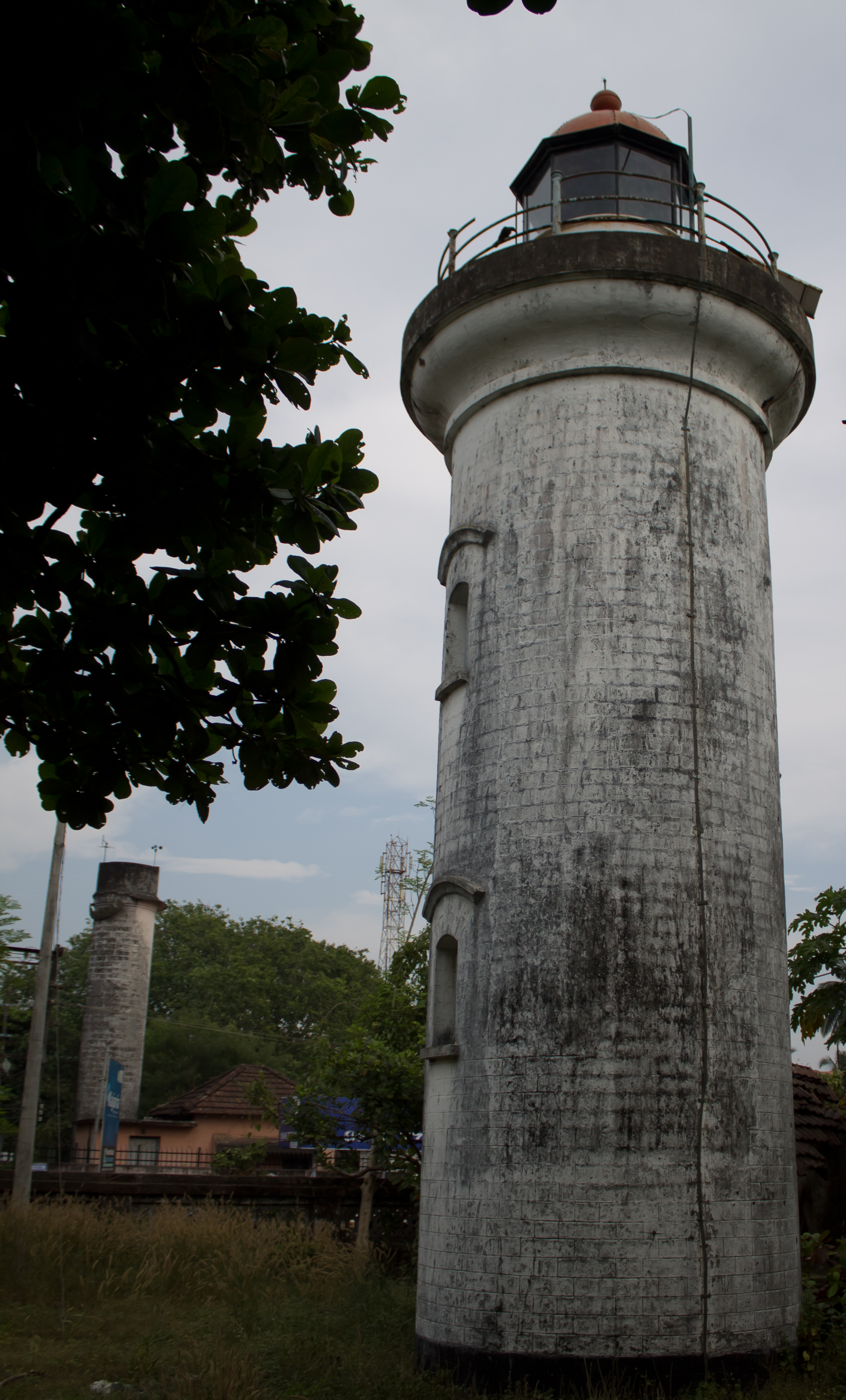
- The lighthouse in 2012
- Location: Kerala, India
- Coordinates: 11°15′30″N 75°46′09″E

Tower
- Constructed: 1847 (first)
- Construction: masonry tower
- Height: 15 metres (49 ft) (current); 33 metres (108 ft) (first)
- Shape: cylindrical tower with balcony and lantern
- Markings: white tower and lantern
- Power source: mains electricity

Light
- First lit: 1907 (current)
- Focal height: 17 metres (56 ft)
- Characteristic: Fl (2) W 6 s

Kozhikkode Lighthouse is a defunct light in the Kozhikkode District of Kerala. It was constructed in 1907. The first lighthouse was constructed in 1847 at a height of 33 meters (108 ft). The current tower is 15 meters (49 ft) and is painted white. Kozhikode or Calicut lighthouse is automated, and an LED flasher apparatus is in use.

== History ==
In 1847, a 33-meter (108 ft) tower was erected using stones in lime mortar. The light was a fixed one with wick lamp using coconut oil, and a metal reflector was placed on the back of it. The light was improved in 1881 using a fourth-order fixed optic transferred from Armagon lighthouse. Mr. Ashpitel, an engineer with the Public works department, who was deputed to study on lighthouses in Madras Presidency in 1885, recommended the height of the tower be reduced to improve the efficiency of light. A new tower 15 meters (49 ft) high was erected in 1903 and using the available optic and an occulting mechanism imported from England; the light was converted from fixed to occulting. Further modifications were done in 1924 by converting the light to a flashing one using acetylene gas flasher. The light was converted to LED flashing light using solar energy in 2008.

== See also ==
- List of lighthouses in India
