= Middle Ground Coastal Battery =

Heritage gun battery in India

Coordinates: 18°55′07″N 72°50′52″E

The Middle Ground Coastal Battery is a heritage site of an antique coastal artillery battery managed by the Indian Navy on an islet off the coast of Mumbai, India. It is situated on Middle Ground isle in Mumbai Harbour, a few hundred metres away from the Gateway of India, in Thane Creek.

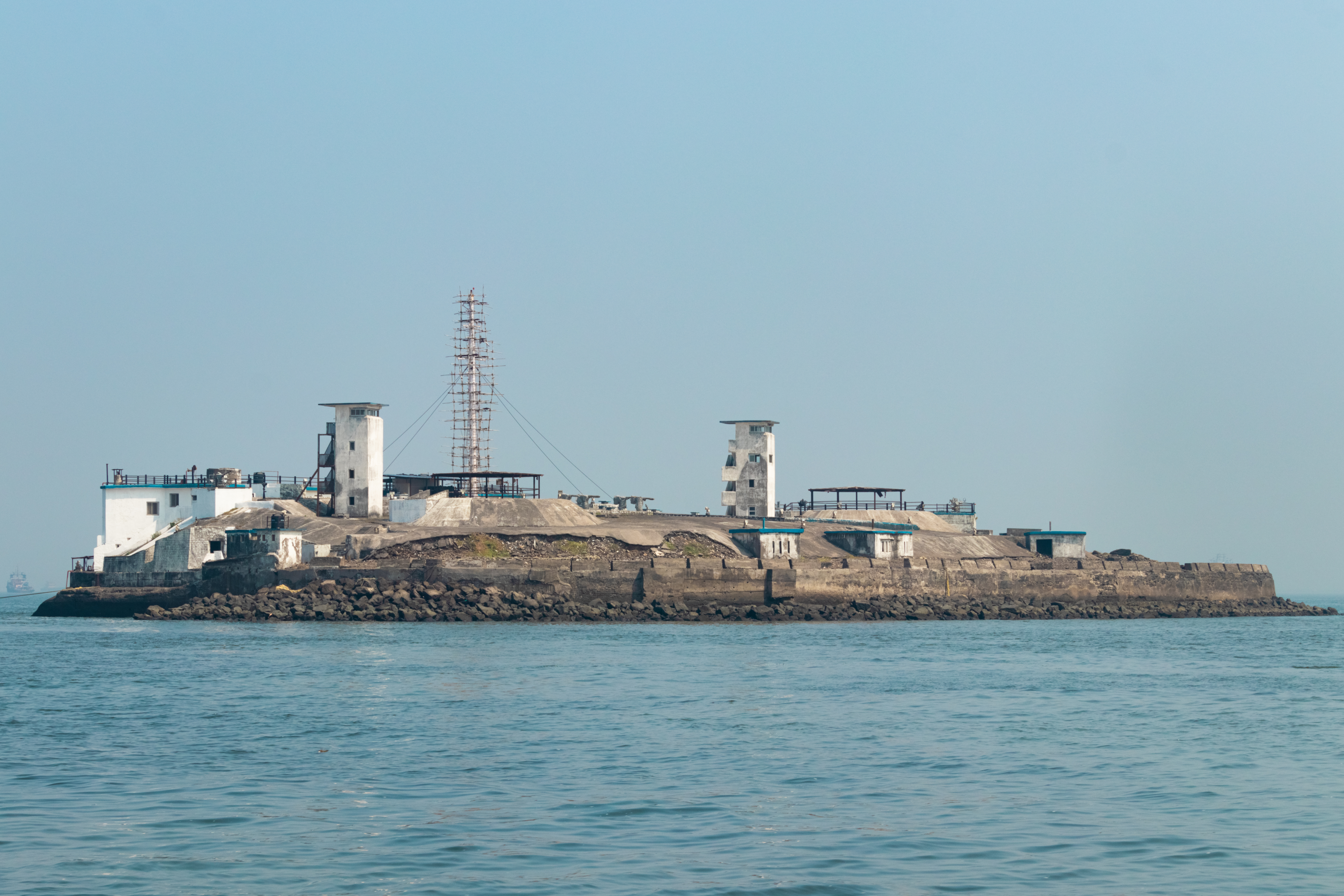
The Middle Ground Coastal Battery in Mumbai

== History ==
The Middle Ground Coastal Battery was once part of a reef, like the nearby Oyster Rock. Middle Ground islet is a piece of hard basalt rock, emerging from the creek bed, having an area of a few hundred square meters.

The island was fortified in 1682 by the British East India Company to curb the sea piracy in the area. Later a marine police force of Bhandaris was stationed on the islet to keep an eye on the pirates who used to board ships. The Bhandaris were chosen for their honesty and local knowledge. They had a distinctive uniform of yellow turbans and blue trousers. After piracy moved to the South China Sea, about two hundred years ago, the police were disbanded and the rock passed into the control of the Royal Navy (RN), and from thence to the Royal Indian Navy (RIN) and eventually to the Indian Navy (IN).

The RIN added to the fortifications with the use of coastal guns and later on three anti-aircraft guns to protect the harbour from a perceived Japanese invasion during World War II. The AA guns were eventually removed, but the deep cylindrical mountings of the old guns still remain.

== Current use ==
The island is occupied by a staff of eight sailors of the Indian Navy who keep in touch with the mainland through radio communications. Currently the island serves as the saluting base to the Flag Officer Commander-in-Chief (FOC-in-C) of the Western Naval Command. The old cannons are ceremonially fired along with a bugle call when a new FOC-in-C takes office or when a naval ship returns to its home port in the harbour after an extended deployment.

The edifice stores artefacts of the colonial era such as ceramic bathtubs, etc. A maritime museum occupied a portion of the isle, but it was shut down in 2000 with the exhibits moving to the maritime museum of the decommissioned light aircraft carrier INS Vikrant (1961) when it was opened to the public. Ensigns of old naval ships are still stored on the isle.

The islet is difficult to visit owing to the problems faced while berthing during low tide. The Navy has been offered many lucrative deals for the obsidian isle, but selling it would heavily compromise the security of warships berthed at Naval Jetties.

== See also ==
- List of islands of India
- Bhandaris
