= Azhikode =

Azhikode may refer to:

- Azhikode and Azhikkal, a coastal village in Kannur district, Kerala, India
- Azhikode, Thrissur, a coastal village in Thrissur district, Kerala, India
- Azhikode Assembly constituency
- Azhikode Lighthouse
- Sukumar Azhikode (1926–2012), Indian writer, critic and orator from Kerala
