= Mahabalipuram Lighthouse =

Lighthouse in Tamil Nadu, India

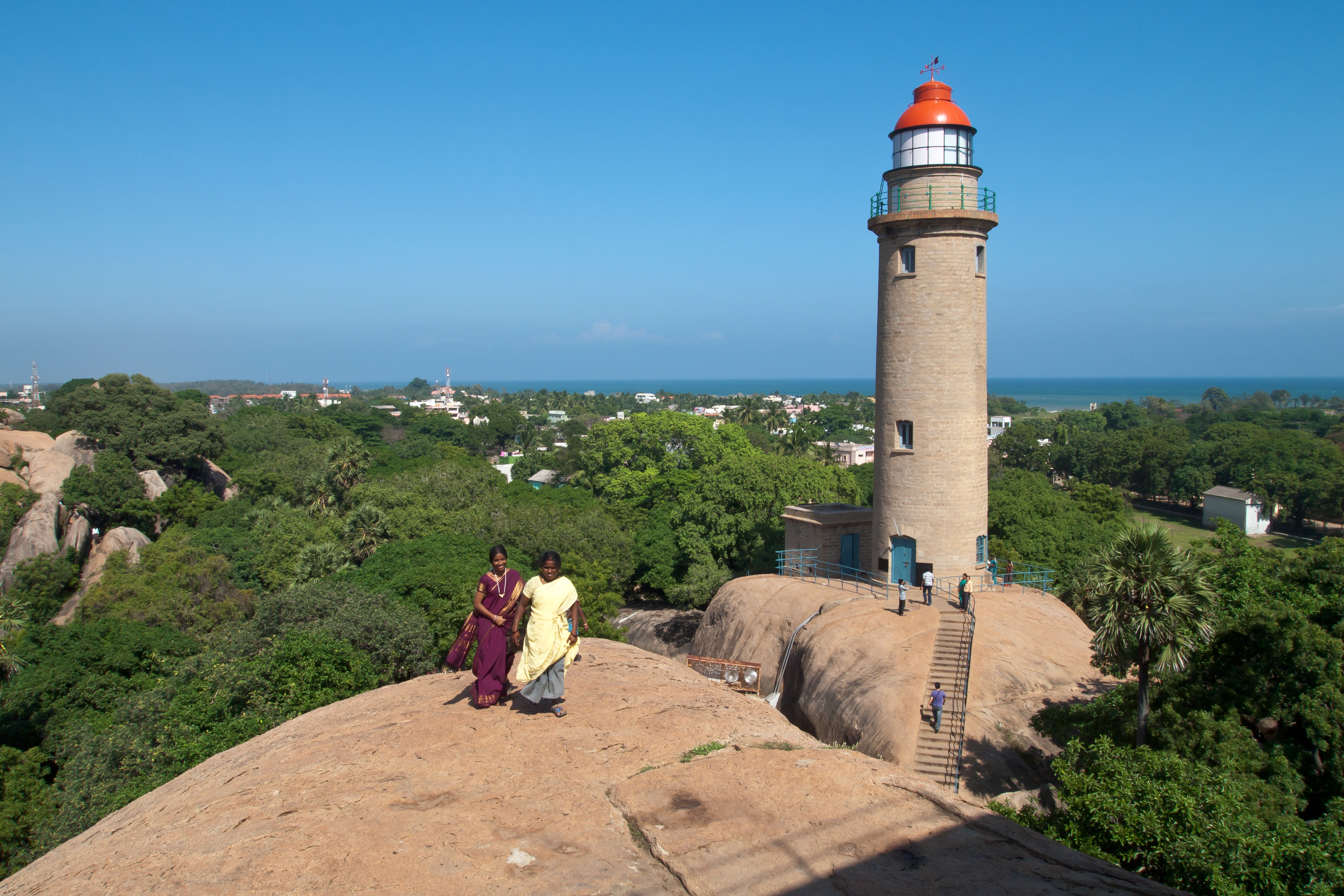
- Location: Mamallapuram, Tamil Nadu, India
- Coordinates: 12°36′55″N 80°11′31″E

Tower
- Construction: stone (tower)
- Height: 26 m (85 ft)
- Shape: cylinder
- Markings: Unpainted (tower), red (dome)
- Power source: mains electricity

Light
- First lit: 1900
- Focal height: 42 m (138 ft)
- Lens: second order Fresnel lens
- Range: 30 nmi (56 km; 35 mi)
- Characteristic: Fl W 10s

Mahabalipuram Lighthouse is located in Tamil Nadu, India. It has been open to tourists since 2011. It was closed in 2001 following a perceived threat from the Liberation Tigers of Tamil Eelam. The first light was commissioned here in 1887 on the roof of the Olakkannesvara Temple. The lighthouse, with a circular masonry tower made of natural stone, became fully functional in 1904. India's oldest lighthouse, built around 640 CE by Pallava king Mahendravarman I stands next to this modern structure. The Pallava era lighthouse is a protected monument, maintained by the Archaeological Survey of India.

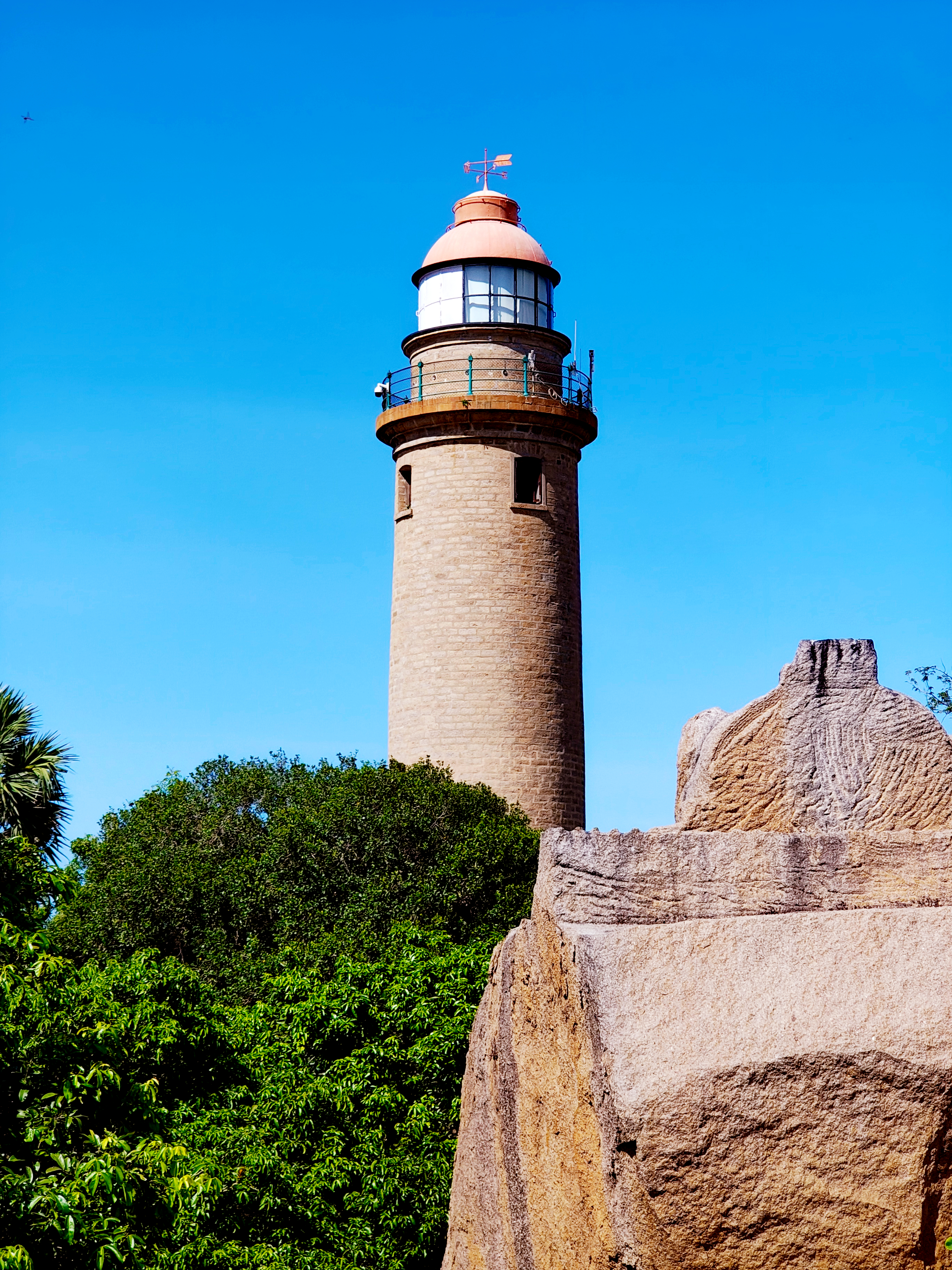
Mamallapuram Light House

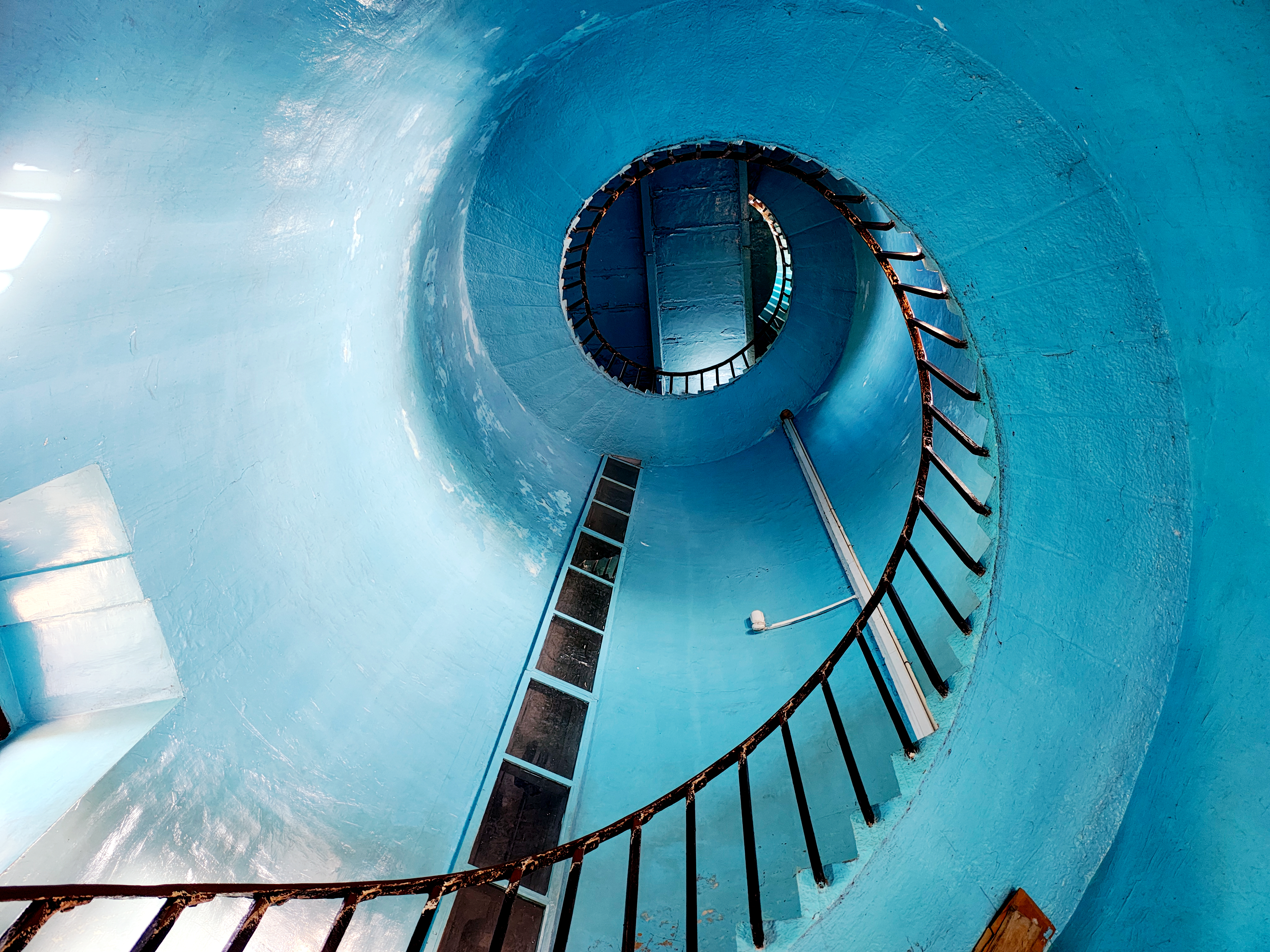
Mamallapuram Light House Stairs

== History ==
Mahabalipuram Lighthouse stands on a natural rock about 35 km south of Chennai. In May 1887, the British installed the first conventional light, a wick lamp within a fourth‑order optic atop the roof of the Olakkannesvara Temple to guide vessels at night. A dedicated 26 m‑high circular masonry tower of dressed stone was built on a nearby rock in 1900, its unpainted exterior left to blend with the surroundings, and the light was commissioned in March 1901. The original oil‑vapor source was replaced by an incandescent electric lamp in 1994, upgraded to a cluster of three 150 W/230 V metal‑halide lamps in August 2004, and fitted with a 236 W LED array, the first of its kind in the DGLL, in August 2020.

== Olakkannesvara Temple ==
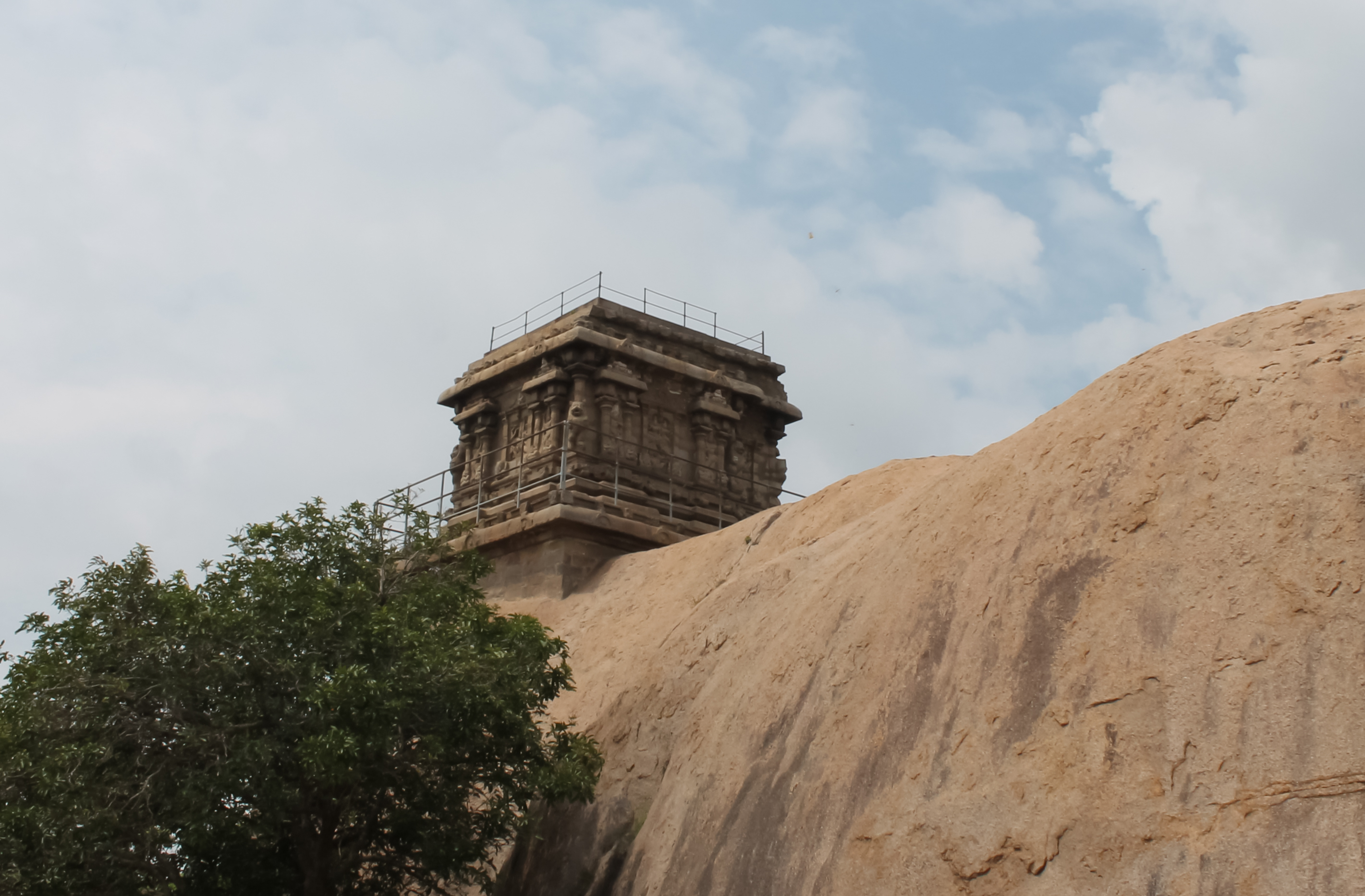

Mahabalipuram was a busy port under the Pallavas as early as the 7th century CE. Bonfires were lit on rocks even at that time to aid the mariners. The British first used the temple atop the Mahishasuramardini cave as a light. The new lighthouse and the old lighthouse are adjacent to each other.

A granite roof was constructed atop the temple to keep the light from 1887 to 1900.

== See also ==
- Chennai Lighthouse
- List of lighthouses in India
