= Honnavar Lighthouse =

Lighthouse in Karnataka, India

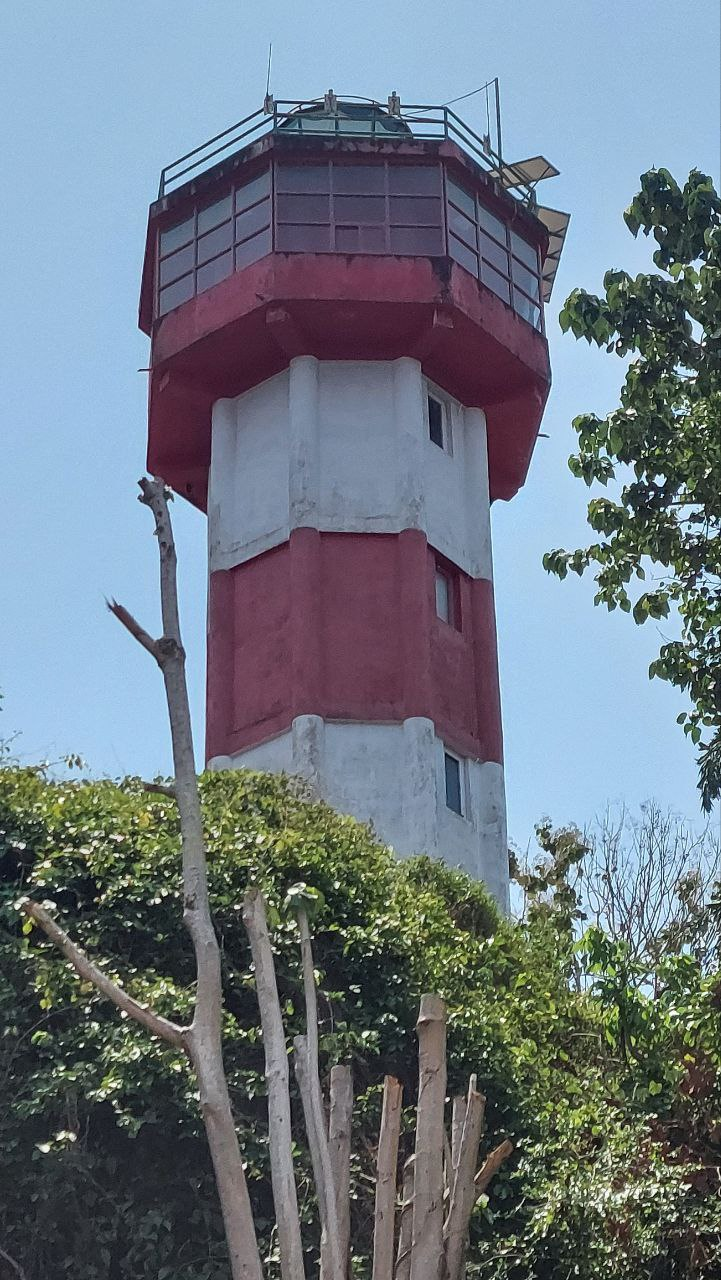
- Location: Honnavar, Karnataka, India
- Coordinates: 14°16′39″N 74°26′34″E

Tower
- Constructed: 2009
- Construction: concrete
- Shape: octagon
- Markings: stripe (red and white, horizontal direction)

Light
- Focal height: 41 m (135 ft)
- Characteristic: Fl W 15s

The Honnavar Lighthouse is located in Honnavar, Karnataka within the government hospital compound on a hill near the fishing harbour.

== History ==
The lighthouse was first built in 1891 as a brick structure.

== See also ==
- List of lighthouses in India
