= Oyster Rock Lighthouse =

Lighthouse in Karnataka, India

Oyster Rock lighthouse
- Location: Karwar, Karnataka; India
- Coordinates: 14.820484°N 74.060576°E

Tower
- Constructed: 1864
- Construction: masonry tower with balcony and lantern
- Height: 20 metres (66 ft)
- Shape: cylindrical tower
- Markings: red tower with a white horizontal band, white lantern and red dome
- Power source: solar power

Light
- Focal height: 62 metres (203 ft)
- Lens: 2nd order Fresnel lens
- Range: 20 nautical miles (37 km; 23 mi)
- Characteristic: Fl W 10s.

The Oyster Rock Lighthouse is located in Karwar, Karnataka, India, on one of the islands located close to Karwar, Oyster Rock. Tourists can reach this island with the help of motor boats, which are available from Karwar Port. Constructed by the British during the 1860s, the lighthouse became functional from 25 March 1864.

The tower has a dome on the top, from where the entrance to the lantern room can be seen. The lantern was painted white rather than orange or red, in order to make the sunrise and sunset more apparent.

== See also ==
- List of lighthouses in India
