= Dolphin Lighthouse =

Lighthouse in India

Dolphin Lighthouse Dolphin Rock
- Location: Mumbai Harbour, India
- Coordinates: 18.914310°N 72.835908°E

Tower
- Constructed: 1850
- Construction: Stone
- Height: 13 metres (43 ft)
- Shape: Cylindrical, with keeper’s house, balcony and lantern
- Markings: Unpainted tower, white keeper’s house and lantern
- Operator: Mumabi Port Trust

Light
- Focal height: 11 metres (36 ft)
- Range: white: 11 nautical miles (20 km; 13 mi) red: 5 nautical miles (9.3 km; 5.8 mi)
- Characteristic: Fl (4) WR 20s. depending on direction

Dolphin Lighthouse (or Dolphin Rock Light) is one of the three lighthouses in the Mumbai harbour off the coast of Mumbai, India. It is near the Gateway of India and is controlled by the Indian Navy. To honour military personnel, a 21 gun salute is held every time a warship sails out of the Mumbai harbour with The Admiral of The Fleet. This lighthouse is also illuminated during Navy Day celebrations which happen during the first week of December every year.

== History ==
The lighthouse is one of the oldest in Bombay Harbour. It was first lit in 1856 to mark the Dolphin Rock shoal and ensure safe passage of ships approaching Mumbai port. Dolphin Lighthouse formed part of a chain of harbour lights developed by the British. It originally displayed a white‑green occulting light with a 4‑second cycle, visible out to about 7 nautical miles. The lighthouse has always been unattended (automated) and does not carry resident keepers. Over time its role has diminished with modern navigation systems. Today it is reported to be unlit and no longer serves as an active aid to navigation.

== Design and Technical Features ==
Dolphin Lighthouse is built of stone in a plain cylindrical form, capped by a lantern chamber with a balcony. The tower is approximately 18 m (59 ft) tall. It originally exhibited a group-flashing light: four flashes every 20 seconds, showing a white sector visible to 11 nautical miles and a red sector to 5 nautical miles. Photographic surveys note its focal plane about 11 m above sea level with the red sector covering bearings 147–236° and 270–360°, and white sector 236–270°. These characteristics ensured it could be seen by ships at moderate range in the harbour approaches. The tower itself is unpainted stone, with the lantern room painted white.

== See also ==
- List of lighthouses in India
