= Veraval Lighthouse =

Lighthouse in Gujarat, India

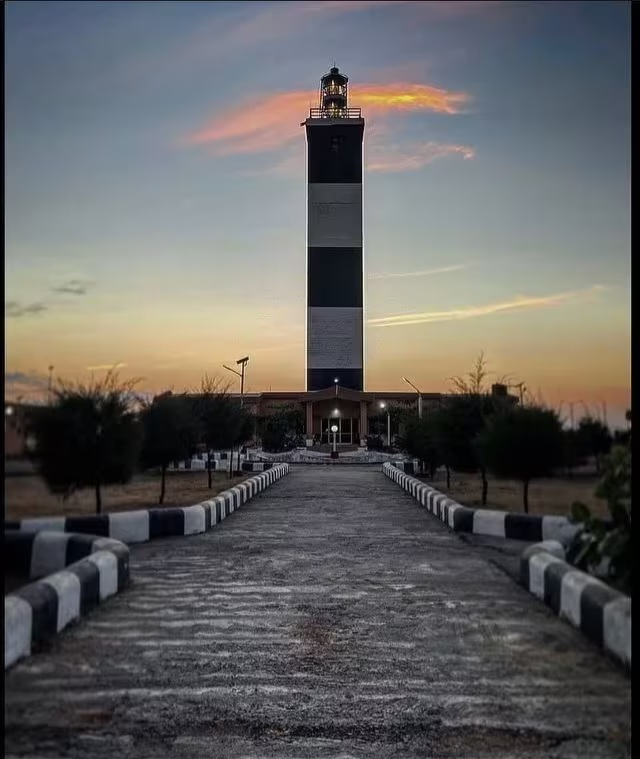
- Location: Veraval, Gujarat, India
- Coordinates: 20°54′41″N 70°21′11″E

Tower
- Constructed: 1865 (first)
- Foundation: reinforced concrete
- Construction: masonry tower
- Height: 30 metres (98 ft)
- Shape: Cylindrical tower D shaped in cross section with balcony and lantern
- Markings: Black and white horizontal bands

Light
- First lit: 1967
- Focal height: 33 metres (108 ft) above MSL
- Lens: 250 mm 4th order cut & polished drum optic inside 1.8 m diameter Lantern House (BBT)
- Intensity: 500W halogen lamp (220/250 volt) AC
- Range: 24 nautical miles (44 km; 28 mi)
- Characteristic: Fl W 5s.

Veraval Lighthouse is a prominent lighthouse located on the Arabian Sea near the historic port city of Veraval in Gujarat, India. Situated approximately 2.5 kilometers west of the Veraval harbor, the lighthouse stands as both a vital aid to maritime navigation and a symbol of the region's rich seafaring heritage. Originally established in the 19th century with a simple lamp system by British Raj, it has evolved into a fully modernized concrete structure equipped with advanced optics and automated lighting.

== History ==
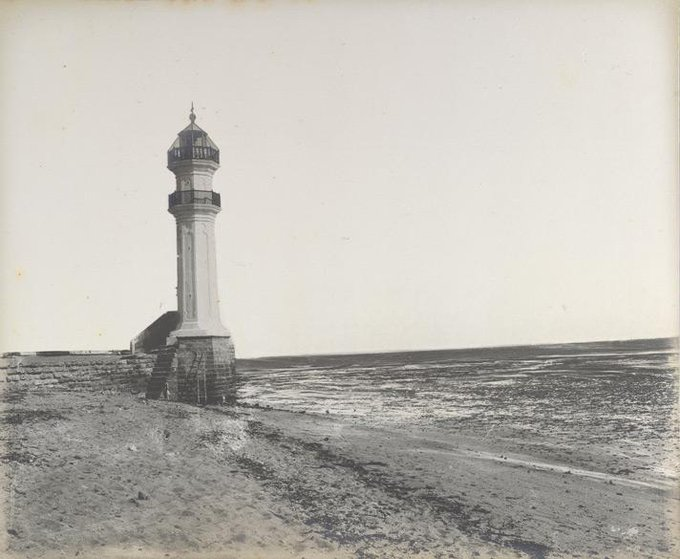
Old Lighthouse photo captured in 1900

Veraval, an important fishing and trade port on Gujarat's Arabian Sea coast, initially relied on a simple wick lamp hoisted on a flag mast to guide sailors. In the 1860s an ordinary wick lamp used to be hoisted from a flag mast. During the same period construction of a 14m high tower, octagonal in shape was taken up in the port premises at the root of break water. It was completed in 1865 when the wick lamp was shifted on to the new tower. In the year 1876, alterations were carried out and a 4th order optical equipment supplied by M/s. Chance Bros., Birmingham was installed in place of the old equipment. The new illuminant consisted of large diameter single wick oil burner; special mirrors were placed at the back of the apparatus for the reflection of the light.

In February 1927 Mr D. Alan Stevenson, the lighthouse expert visited the light house and recommended for shifting of lighthouse to another site. In 1935 modifications in the same lighthouse were carried out and an occulting light equipment was installed in place of the fixed wick lamp. And a fixed Red light was also provided on the nearby Bhirria Beacon. In 1964–65, a new site approximately 2.5 km west of the old port was selected, and a modern 30-meter high concrete tower was constructed. The current lighthouse was commissioned on 1 July 1967, equipped with advanced French optics from Barbier, Bénard & Turenne and a 3.5 kW filament lamp system.

Over time, the lighthouse underwent several technological upgrades. The fog signal, once a critical feature, was discontinued in 1987. In 1996, the light source was modernized to a 500 W halogen-based automatic Dhoomketu system, which remains operational today. The lower tier of the original twin-lantern design was deactivated during this update. In recent years, as part of India's “Lighthouse Tourism” initiative, Veraval Lighthouse was transformed into a heritage and tourism site. On 1 July 2023, it was formally opened to the public with added visitor facilities, educational exhibits, and panoramic coastal views.

== Structure and technical specifications ==
The structure stands at a height of 35 meters, with its focal plane at 38 meters above mean sea level, ensuring optimal visibility for sea traffic. The lighthouse is constructed from reinforced cement concrete, giving it durability against the corrosive marine environment. Its cylindrical tower with a D-shaped cross section is architecturally unique and designed to minimize wind resistance. The exterior is painted in distinct black and white horizontal bands, which enhances its identification during daylight hours. The optical system of the Veraval Lighthouse was initially a dual-tier setup, each equipped with 1000 mm Fresnel drum optics—a sophisticated lens type known for its high efficiency in focusing light. Originally, the light source consisted of a powerful 3.5 kW filament lamp, which produced a strong white light. After modernization in 1996, this was replaced by a Dhoomketu system: an automated, energy-efficient lighting setup that uses three 500-watt halogen lamps with a built-in redundancy mechanism. This system ensures that if one lamp fails, another automatically takes over, preventing any interruption in the light signal. The lighthouse displays an occulting white light—meaning the light is visible for most of the cycle and briefly eclipsed once every 15 seconds—making it distinguishable from other lights on shore.

Historically, the lighthouse was also equipped with a fog signal, which operated until 1987. This auditory aid was especially useful during low-visibility conditions, though it was later deemed obsolete due to advancements in electronic navigation. In addition, a Decca Navigator System was installed nearby in the 1960s and later replaced by Loran-C (Long Range Navigation) technology in the early 1990s to provide enhanced positional data to ships. The entire system is now fully automated and managed remotely by the Directorate General of Lighthouses and Lightships (DGLL), which ensures round-the-clock monitoring and maintenance.

== See also ==
- List of lighthouses in India
