= Chetwai Lighthouse =

Lighthouse in Kerala, India

- Location: Chettuva, Kerala; India
- Coordinates: 10°33′14.2″N 76°01′02.4″E

Tower
- Constructed: 1986
- Construction: concrete tower
- Height: 30 metres (98 ft)
- Shape: cylindrical tower with double balcony and lantern
- Markings: white and red horizontal bands

Light
- Focal height: 33.8 metres (111 ft)
- Light source: 500 W Halogen Lamp (220/250 V AC)
- Range: 19 nautical miles (35 km; 22 mi)
- Characteristic: Fl (2) W 20s.

The Chetwai Lighthouse is situated at Chettuva near Guruvayur in Thrissur District of Kerala. It was inaugurated on 29 September 1986. The tower is a 30-meter tall concrete structure. There did not exist any lighthouse earlier to the present one at this place. The light source was changed on 30 April 2003.

== See also ==
- List of lighthouses in India
