= Kovilthottam Lighthouse =

Lighthouse in Kerala, India

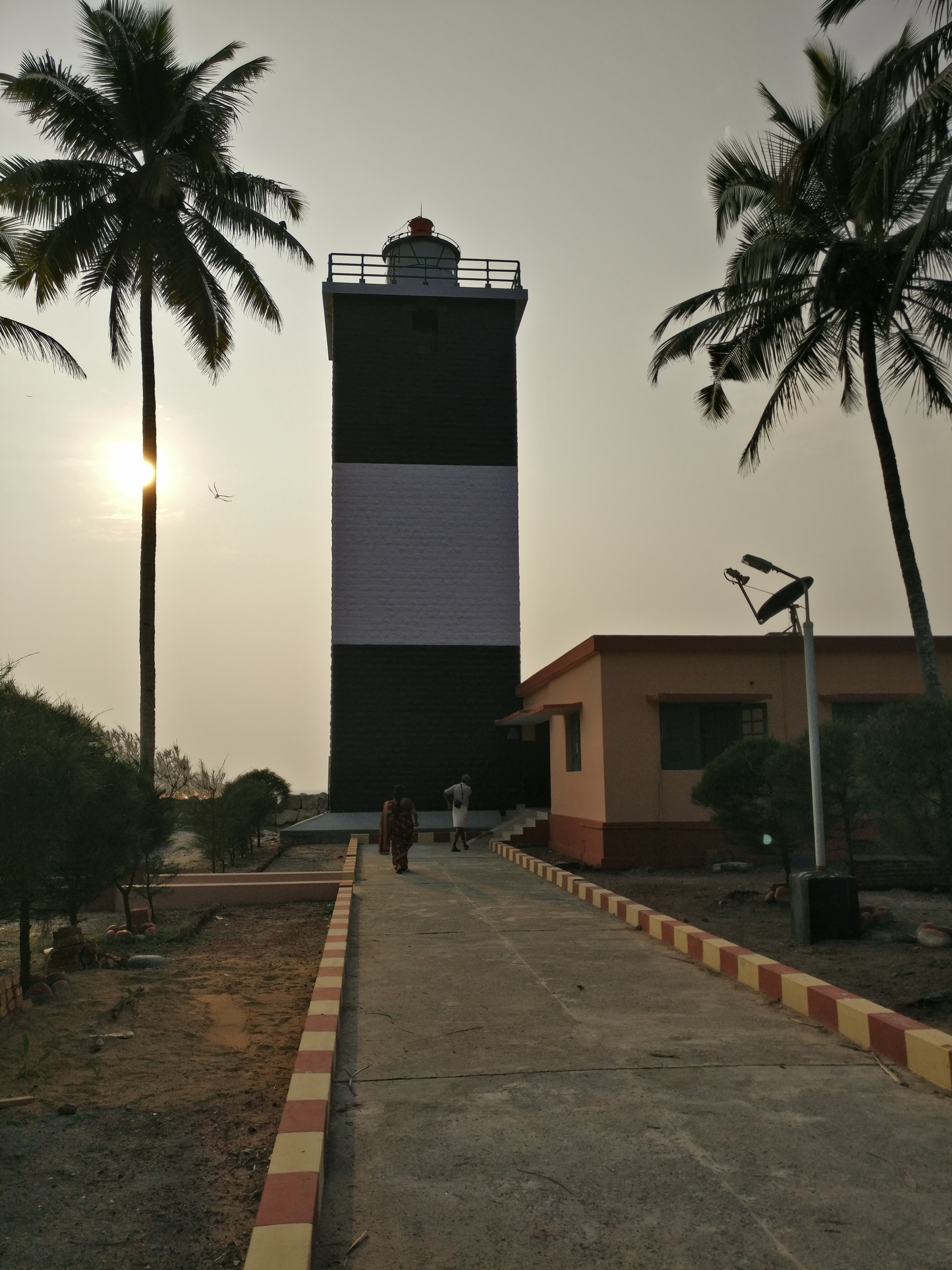
- The lighthouse in 2016
- Location: Kovilthottam, Kollam, India
- Coordinates: 8°59′05″N 76°31′28″E

Tower
- Constructed: 1953 (first)
- Foundation: reinforced concrete
- Construction: masonry tower
- Height: 18 metres (59 ft)
- Shape: square tower with balcony and lantern
- Markings: black tower with a horizontal white band, black lantern

Light
- First lit: 1962
- Focal height: 20 metres (66 ft) above MSL
- Lens: 250 mm 4th order cut & polished drum optic inside 1.8 m diameter Lantern House (BBT)
- Intensity: 500W halogen lamp (220/250 volt) AC
- Range: 15 nautical miles (28 km; 17 mi)
- Characteristic: Fl W 5s.

Kovilthottam Lighthouse is situated at Kovilthottam in Kollam district of Kerala. The 18-meter-tall lighthouse tower is painted with black and white alternating bands. Operated by the Directorate General of Lighthouses and Lightships, the lighthouse features a 70 W LED light with a range of 15 nautical miles and the characteristic Fl (3) W 15s.

== Structure & Technical Specifications ==
The Kovilthottam Lighthouse stands on the Arabian Sea coast near the mouth of the Ashtamudi Lake. The lighthouse was constructed to aid navigation for vessels entering the Neendakara and Chavara backwaters, which are vital for the local fishing and cashew industries. The tower is a cylindrical concrete structure with a height of 18 meters (59 ft), painted with black and white horizontal bands, and topped by a red lantern. The focal plane of the light is situated 17 meters above mean sea level. The lighthouse originally used an oil-based light source, later replaced by an electronic flasher powered by solar energy. The current light characteristic is Fl (3) W 15s, meaning three white flashes every 15 seconds, with a range of 15 nautical miles. The light source is a 70 W LED, and the lantern uses a 6-panel optic manufactured by M/s J. Stone & Co. Ltd., UK. The structure includes a service room and gallery, and is operated and maintained by the Directorate General of Lighthouses and Lightships (DGLL) under Ministry of Ports, Shipping and Waterways.

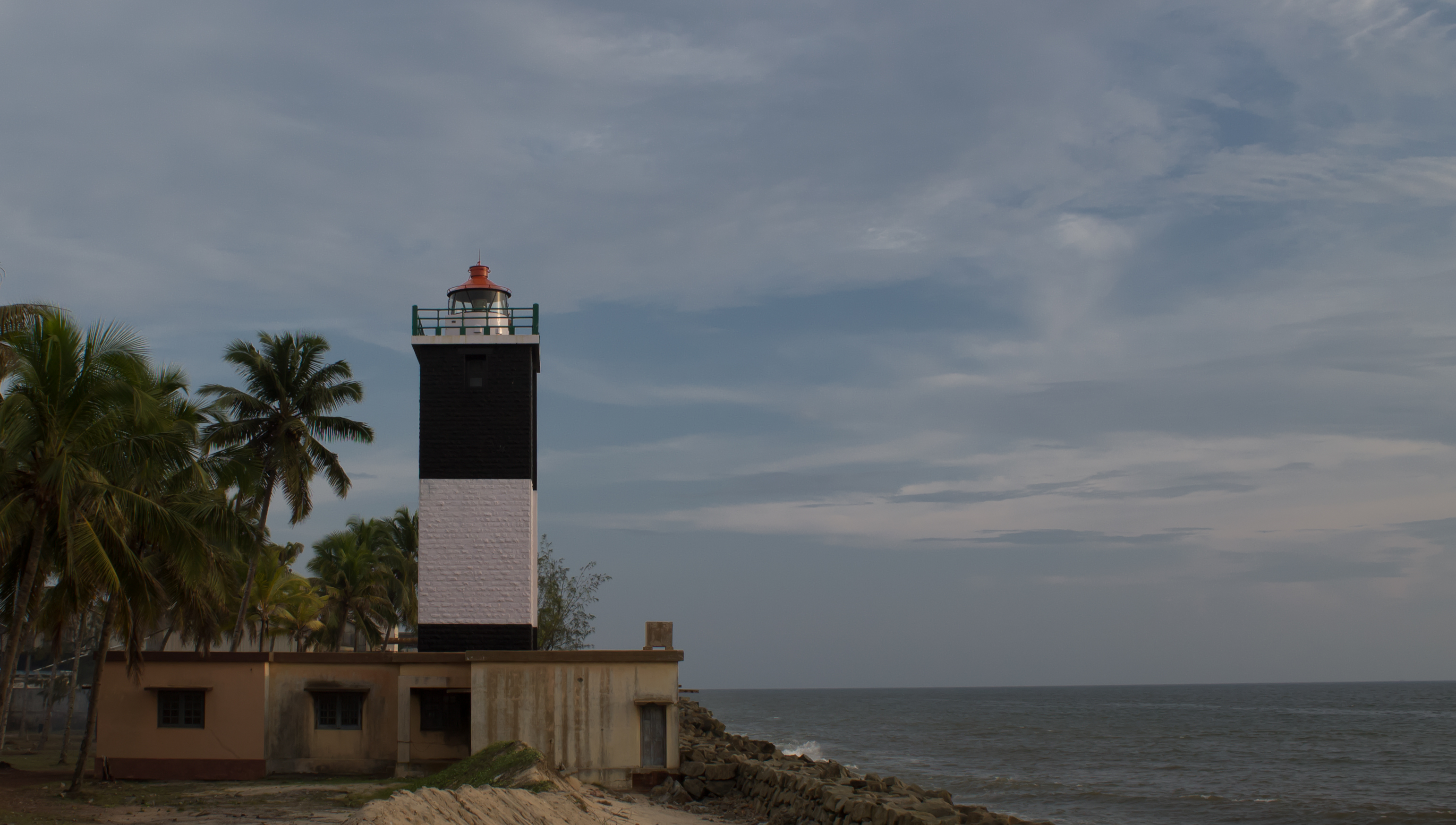
With coast

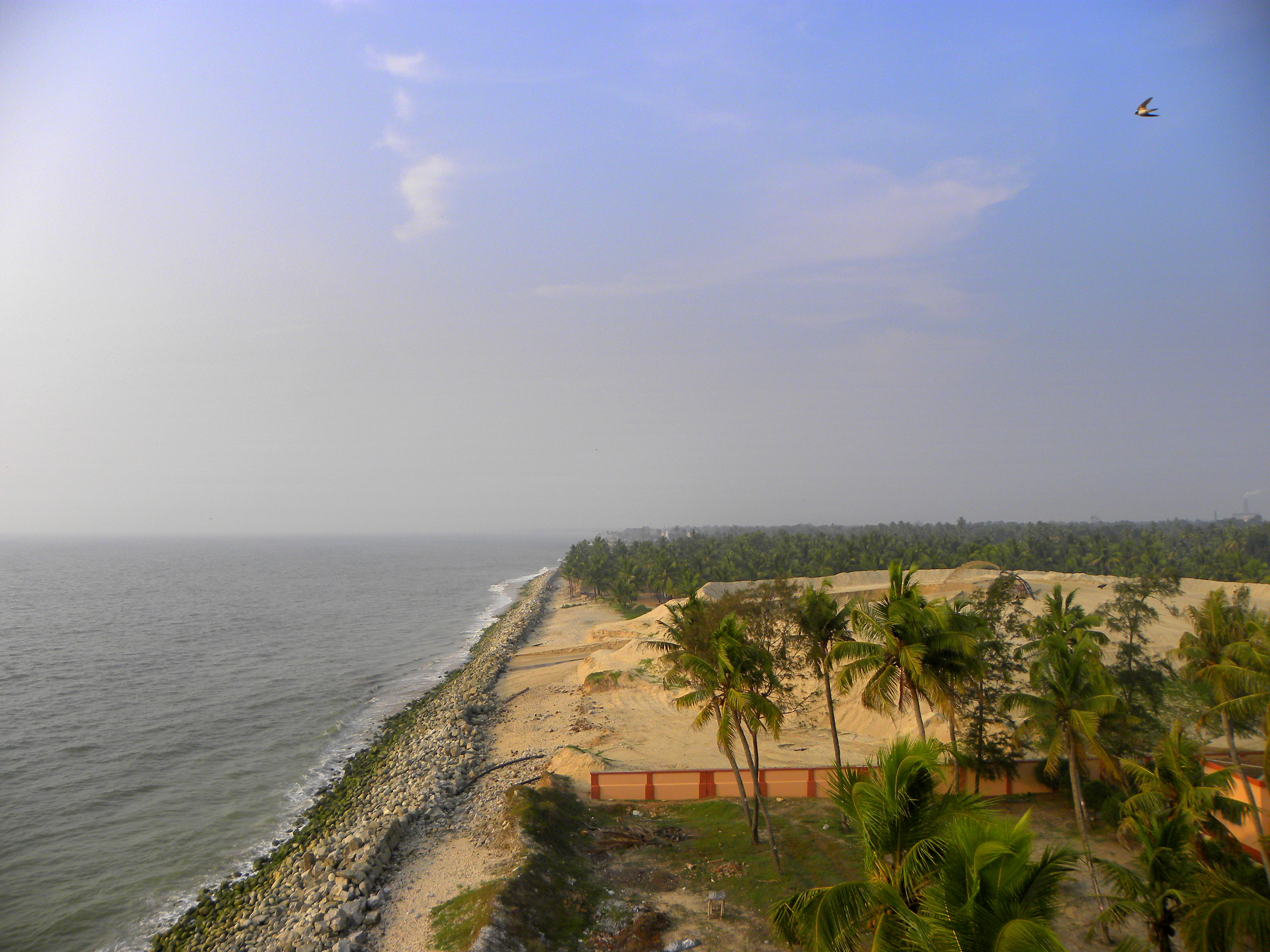
View from lighthouse

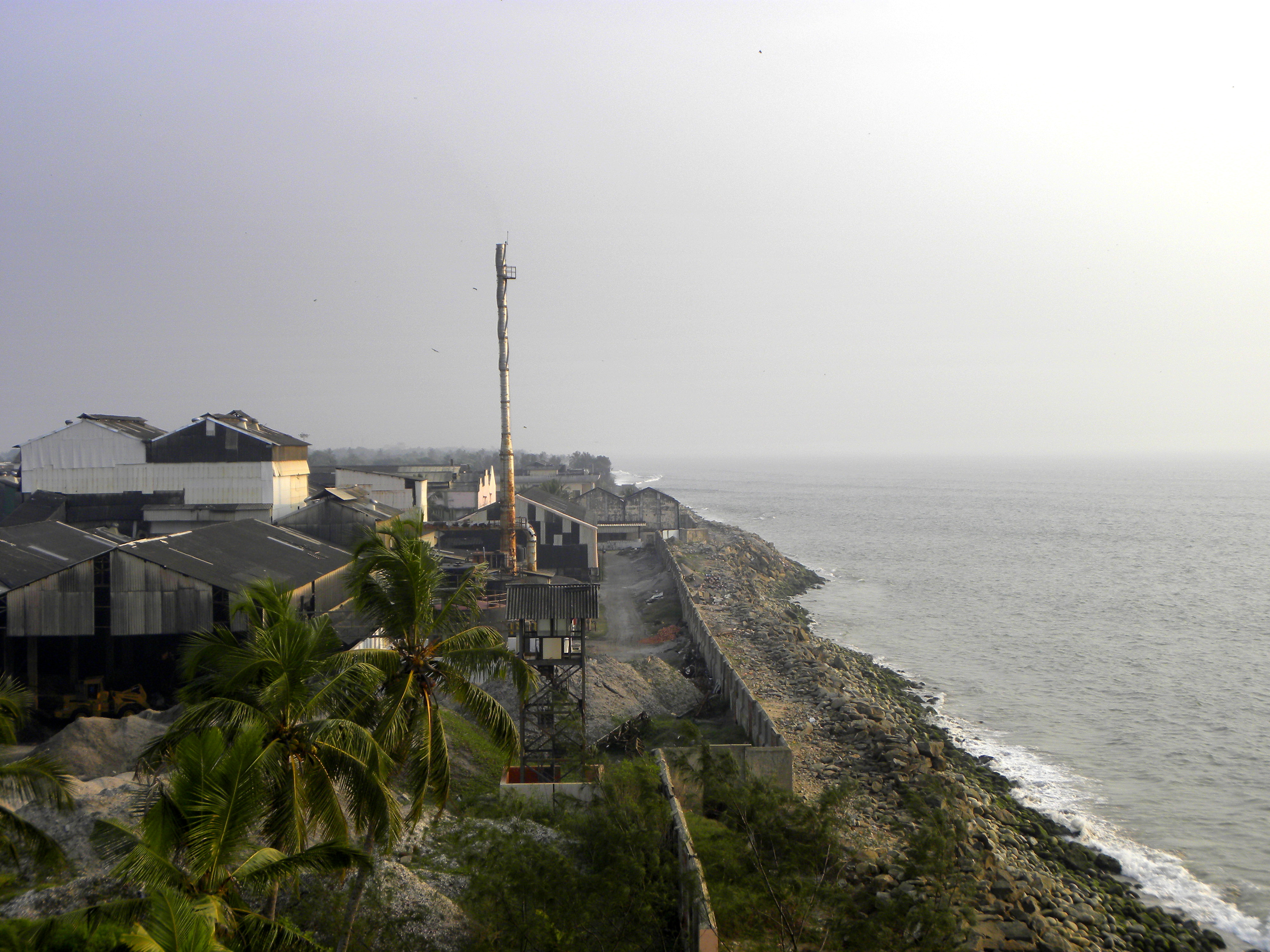
View from lighthouse

== See also ==
- List of lighthouses in India
