= Beypore Lighthouse =

Lighthouse in Kerala, India

Beypore lighthouse
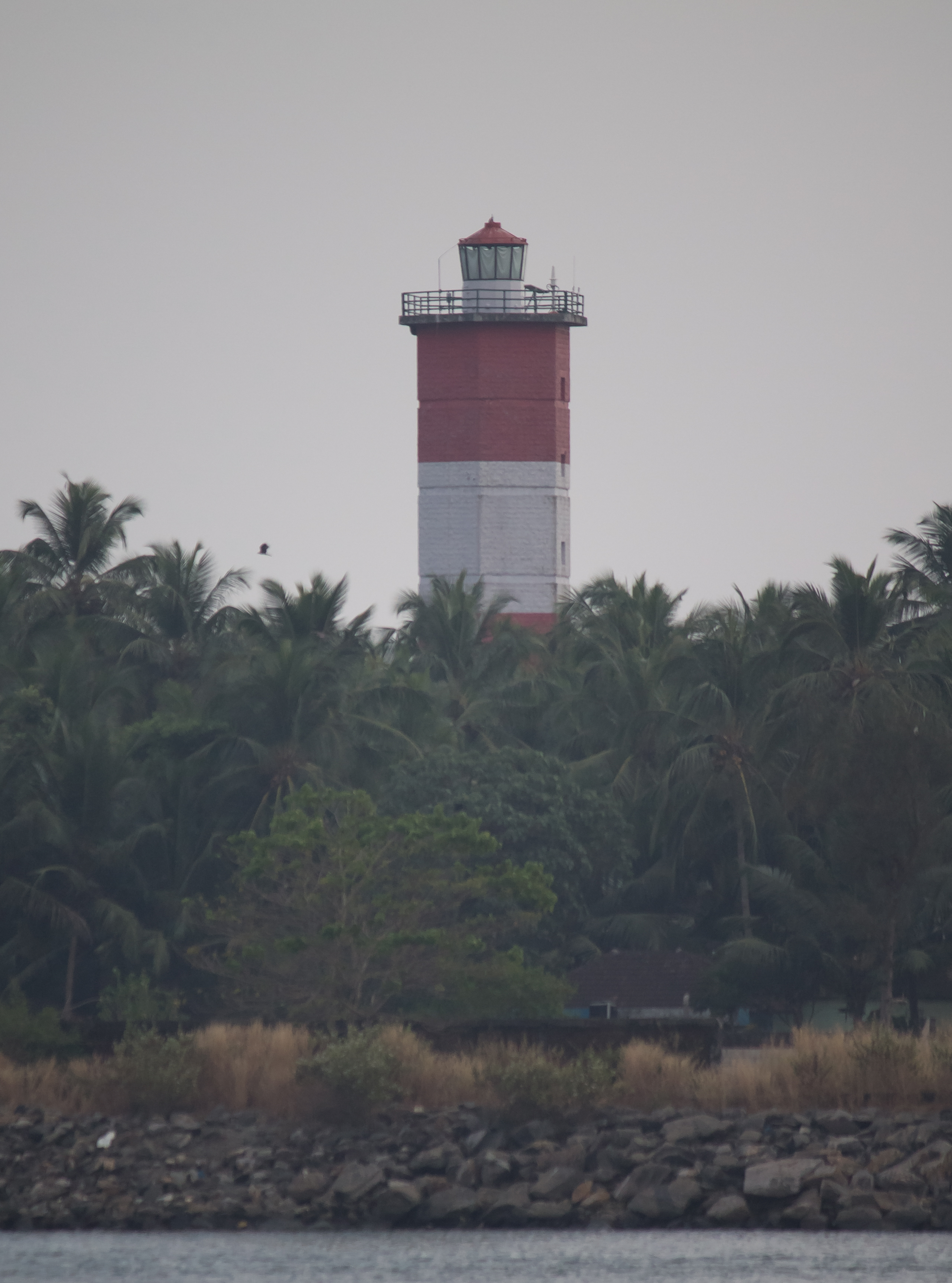
- View from the northern shore of Chaliyar
- Location: Feroke, Kerala
- Coordinates: 11°09.4962′N 75°48.351′E

Tower
- Construction: concrete tower
- Height: 30.48 metres (100.0 ft)
- Shape: hexagonal tower with balcony and lantern
- Power source: mains electricity
- Racon: G

Light
- First lit: 1977
- Focal height: 32 metres (105 ft)
- Range: 16 nautical miles (30 km; 18 mi)
- Characteristic: Fl (2) W 15s.

The Beypore Lighthouse is a lighthouse at Feroke, Kozhikode, on the south shore of the Chaliyam River. The six-sided tower has a height of 30.48 metres (100.0 ft). The tower is painted with red and white bands. The lighthouse started functioning on 21 November 1977. The light source is metal halide lamp.

The Beypore Lighthouse was constructed in 1977 and the equipment supplied by M/s. J. Stone India, Calcutta, was installed at the station. It was commissioned on 21 November 1977. The replacement of the incandescent lamp by 230V 400W Metal halide lamp and integration of the direct drive system here was completed on 30 July 1998.

== See also ==
- List of lighthouses in India
