= Minicoy Island Lighthouse =

Lighthouse in India

Minicoy Island Lighthouse மினிகாய் தீவு கலங்கரை விளக்கு
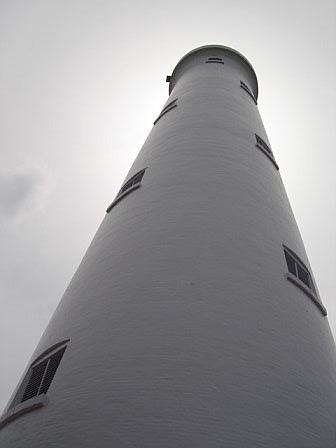
- View of the Minicoy Lighthouse (Maliku), at Lakshadweep, India
- Location: Minicoy island, Lakshadweep, India
- Coordinates: 8.26933°N 73.02604°E

Tower
- Constructed: 1885
- Construction: masonry tower
- Automated: Yes
- Height: 49.5 metres (162 ft)
- Shape: cylindrical tower with balcony and lantern
- Markings: white tower, red lantern roof
- Operator: Directorate General of Lighthouses and Lightships

Light
- Focal height: 47 metres (154 ft)
- Intensity: Main – 400 W, 230 V Metal Halide
- Range: 40 nautical miles (74 km)
- Characteristic: Fl W 15s. (0.66 + 14.34)

The Minicoy Island Lighthouse, which was established on 2 February 1885 at the southern end of the Minicoy Island ('Minicoy' is "Maliku" in local usage) in the Indian union territory of Lakshadweep during the British regime, is 49.5 metres (162 ft) in height and has now a range of 40 nautical miles (74 km) it is built in brick masonry and has a lantern and gallery.

The lighthouse area in the southern part of the island was once exclusively occupied by the British while the local people preferred to live in the northern part. It has modern instrumentation of electrification and an automatic system of shining mirrors that flash light every 15 seconds. It is also equipped with Differential Global Positioning System (DGPS). The lighthouse was brought under the control of the Government of India when the Indian National Flag was unfurled over its top on 2 April 1956.

There is another smaller lighthouse on the island, at its northern end, which was established on 19 November 2008, following the construction of a new jetty with improved landing facilities. It has a focal plane of 22 metres (72 ft).

== History ==
Following the opening of the Suez Canal in 1862, which reduced the distance by sea between Europe and Far East, Lord Ripon, then Governor General of British India, decided to build the light house in 1882 itself, which would have a 360-degree visibility, towering over the surrounding tall coconut trees.

The Board of Trade then decided to establish it as their own lighthouse on the Minicoy Island, to provide guidance for safe passage of their vessels, navigating through the "Eight Degree Channel," which demarcates the northern limit of the island. The site for the lighthouse was selected in 1882. The construction of the structure was begun in 1883 and completed in 1885. The lighthouse was commissioned on 2 February 1885 when Amin of Minicoy and Sir James Douglass, representing the British Government were present. This lighthouse, strategically situated on the sea route from Aden to Colombo and Suez to Singapore passes just south of the Minicoy Island on the Indian coast line leading to Colombo, which was then the "lifeline of the Empire". After building this lighthouse no shipwrecks have occurred on the island. This lighthouse is the lone surviving historic structure of the British period in the Lakshadweep Islands.

Initially, the lighthouse was directly administered by the Board of Trade, London with maintenance control under the Superintendent, Imperial Light Service, Colombo who were also in charge of the Great Basses Reef Lighthouse on the coast of Ceylon. The maintenance drill conducted every six months by the Board of Trade from Ceylon involved change of guard of the light keepers and to refill oil and other stores. After India attained independence, the governments of India and Sri Lanka decided to transfer all functions of the lighthouse formally to India; this legal formality was completed on 19 September 1963. Before that, every British merchant vessel navigating past the lighthouse was levied a toll on the basis of the ship's draft. The toll collected went into the Privy Purse of the British Monarch.

The lighthouse is now under the administrative jurisdiction of the Directorate General of Lighthouses and Lightships (DGLL), under the Ministry of Shipping, and the Cochin Directorate of DGLL has the responsibility to maintain it.

== Features ==
When established in 1885, the tower of the lighthouse designed by Sir James Douglass, was built with bricks brought from London, to a height of 48 metres (157 ft). It was fitted with a first order optic and kerosene wick lamps. Optics had an active focal plane of 47 metres (154 ft). The exterior surface of the lighthouse was given a coat of white paint while the lantern roof was painted in red colour. In 1928, petroleum vapor burners with mantle were installed. It gives a powerful flash every 15 seconds and is seen from 40 nautical miles (74 km) away. A Radar transponder (RACON) was fitted in 1985, and in 1998, it was fitted with a Differential Global Positioning System (DGPS). The optical system consists of 3 panels of 920 millimetres (36 in) with a focal distance of 460 millimetres (18 in). The source of light is of 400 W Metal Hallide Lamp while the rotation of optic is provided by electronic pulse motors. The lighthouse was fitted in 1983 with a medium frequency Radio beacon with a range of 400 kilometres (250 mi) and has a call sign 'NY'. In 1985 a Racon was also fixed at the top of the lighthouse. The tower has a winding staircase access to the top consisting of 216 steps inside.

== See also ==
- List of lighthouses in India

== Bibliography ==
- Ellis, R. H. (1 January 1992). A Short Account of the Laccadive Islands and Minicoy. Asian Educational Services. ISBN 978-81-206-0736-1.
- Rask, Rasmus Kristian (1821). Singalesisk skriftlære. Kolombo. p. 6.
- Singh, Satyindra (1 January 1992). Blueprint to Bluewater, the Indian Navy, 1951–65. Lancer Publishers. ISBN 978-81-7062-148-5.
- Das, Nrupal: Minicoy Island: Beaches, Culture and People of Minicoy, Lakshadweep Islands. 2018, Kindle, 37 Pages (Available Online)
