= Vizhinjam Lighthouse =

Lighthouse in Kerala, India

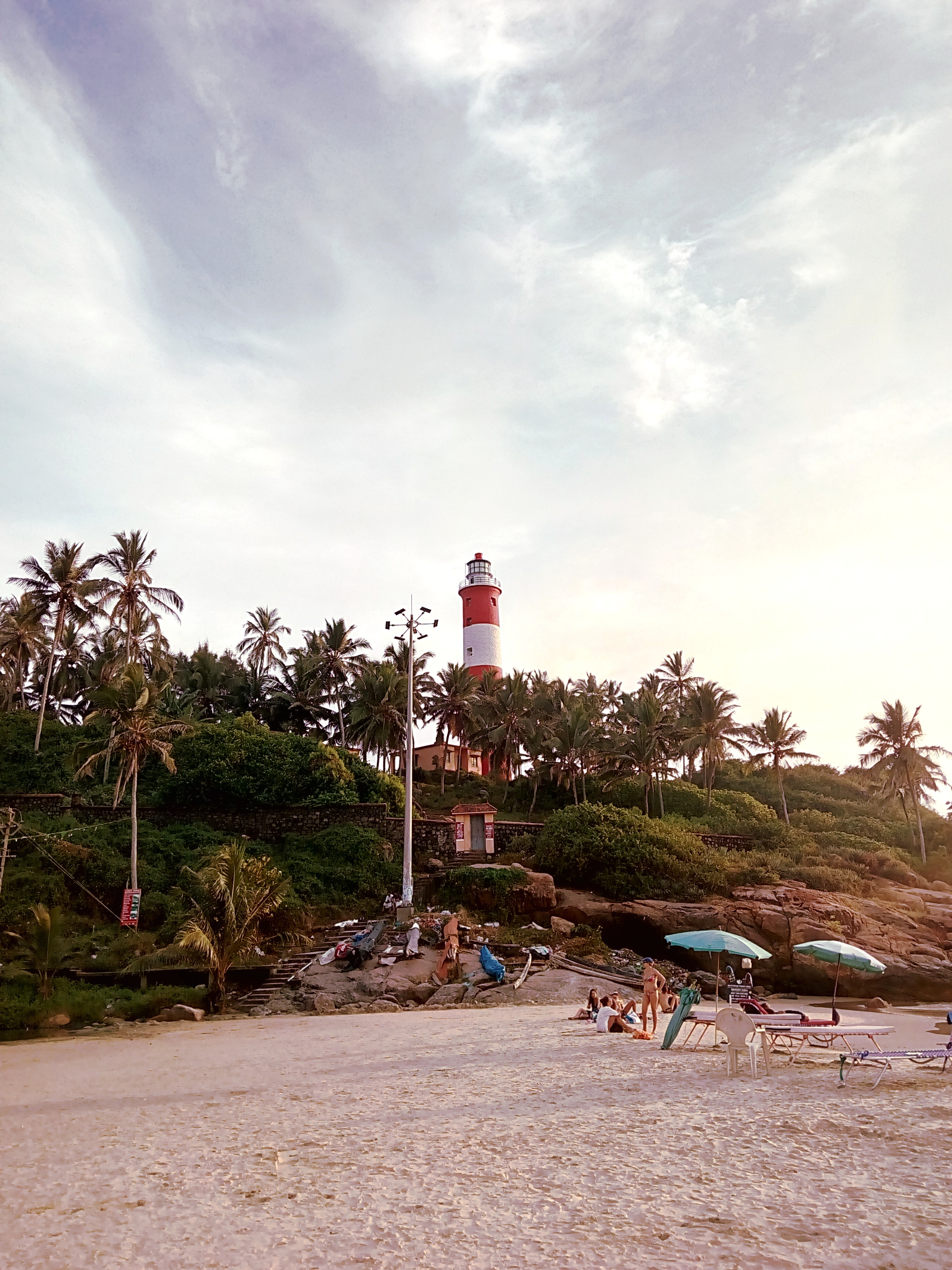
- Location: Kovalam, Thiruvananthapuram district, India
- Coordinates: 8°22′59″N 76°58′48″E

Tower
- Constructed: 1972
- Construction: concrete (tower)
- Height: 36 m (118 ft)
- Shape: cylinder
- Markings: red (dome), stripe (red and white, horizontal direction)

Light
- Focal height: 57 m (187 ft)
- Characteristic: Fl W 15s

Vizhinjam Lighthouse or Trivandrum Lighthouse is situated near Kovalam beach in Kerala. It started functioning on 30 June 1972. Vizhinjam was a busy seaport in the eighteenth and nineteenth centuries. Before the current light was installed, there were no lighthouses at this location. A day mark beacon (flag mast) must have been there in 18th century. After 19th century, this port was in a neglected state. A lighted beacon was constructed in 1925 at nearby Kolachal. Subsequently, a day mark beacon was provided at Vizhinjam during 1960.

== Technical details ==
The tower is cylindrical with a height of 36 meters. The paint markings are red and white bands. The lighthouse is equipped with metal halide lamps and direct drive mechanism. The light source was modified on 30 April 2003.

== See also ==
- List of lighthouses in India
