= Ponnani Lighthouse =

Lighthouse in Kerala, India

Ponnani lighthouse
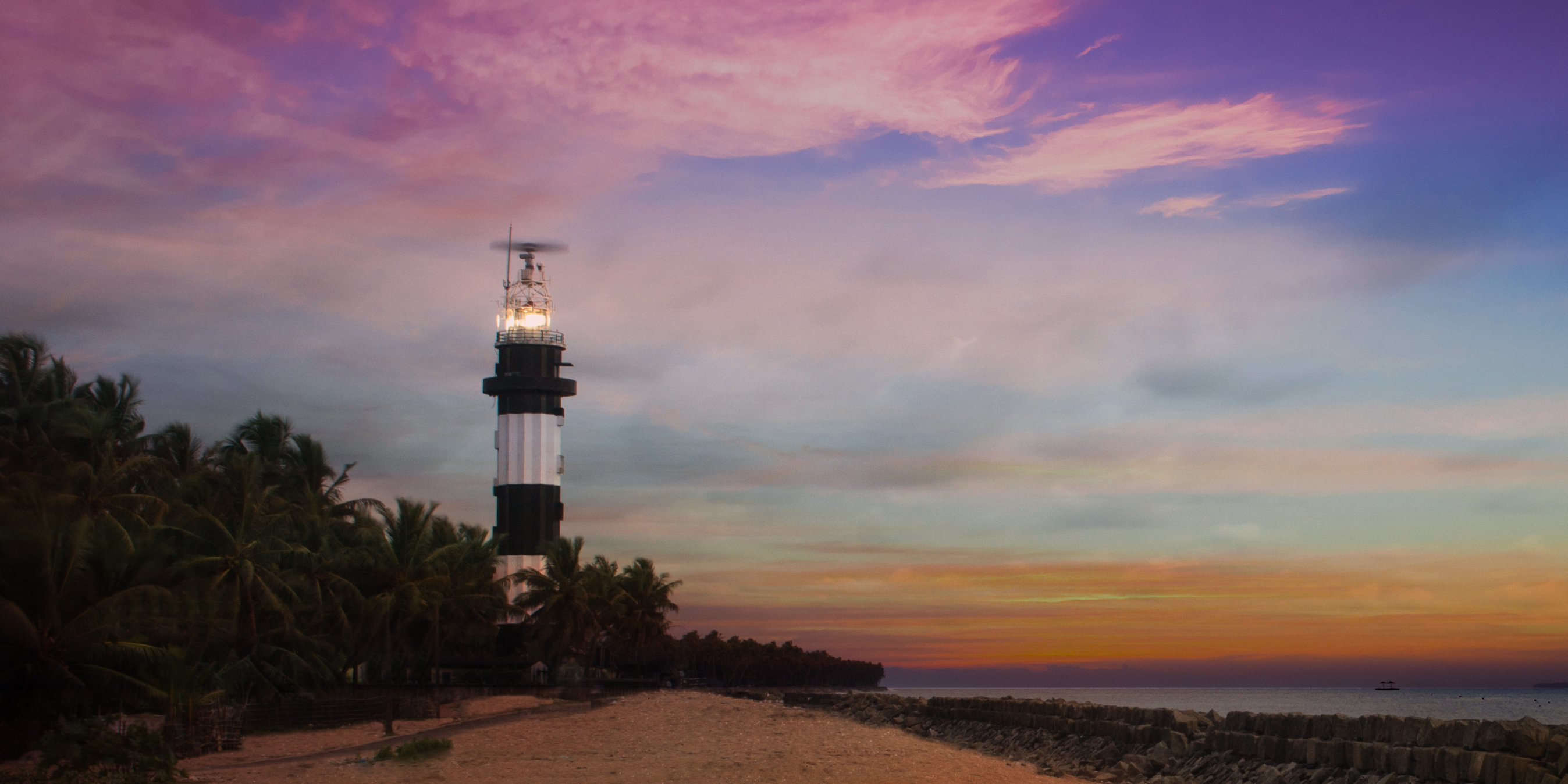
- The lighthouse in 2014
- Location: Ponnani, Kerala; India
- Coordinates: 10°46′41″N 75°55′01″E

Tower
- Constructed: 1937 (first); 1948 (second)
- Construction: concrete tower
- Height: 30 metres (98 ft)
- Shape: dodecagon tower with balcony and lantern
- Markings: white and black horizontal bands

Light
- First lit: 1983 (current)
- Focal height: 34.13 metres (112.0 ft)
- Light source: 500/600 W (metal halide lamp) (220/250 V) AC
- Range: 20.6 nautical miles (38.2 km; 23.7 mi)
- Characteristic: Fl W 15s.

Ponnani Lighthouse is situated in Ponnani, Malappuram district, Kerala on the south bank of the Bharathappuzha river. It was commissioned on 17 April 1983. The tower has a circular cross-section and a height of 30 meters. The light source is a metal halide lamp. The lighthouse has direct drive facility. The Ponnani port is located on the estuary of River Bharathappuzha (the longest river of Kerala) and Tirur River.

A flag staff used to assist the craft to negotiate the entrance to the port prior to a steel mast with an oil wick being hoisted in 1937. In 1948 a steel trestle was with a gas flasher was installed. After the present tower was constructed in 1983, the light source was replaced on 23 July 1995.

== History ==
The Ponnani Lighthouse, located near the southern bank of the Bharathapuzha River on the outskirts of Ponnani town in Kerala, traces its origins to maritime developments during the rule of Hyder Ali and Tipu Sultan in the late 18th century. Tipu Sultan had developed Ponnani as a strategic port for trade and military purposes, which the British later expanded by constructing a canal linking it to Cochin via Cranganore. A flagstaff and later an oil wick lamp on a steel mast were early navigational aids, followed by a DA gas flasher in 1948. Recognizing the need for a major light for general navigation, the present lighthouse tower was constructed in 1982–83 and commissioned on 17 April 1983. The original incandescent lamp was upgraded to a metal halide lamp with direct drive in 1995, marking a significant modernization in its lighting system.

== Specifications ==
Ponnani Lighthouse is located at Lat. 10° 46.5' N, Long. 75° 55.3' E. It is a 30 m high, 24-cornered circular RCC tower painted with black and white bands. Commissioned on 17 April 1983, the lighthouse emits a single white flash every 15 seconds (0.48 sec flash + 14.52 sec dark), with a luminous range of 20.6 nautical miles. It uses a 300 mm 5th-order large revolving optic with two lenses made by J. Stone & Co., Kolkata, mounted on a ball bearing pedestal driven by a dual stepper motor. The light source is a 230V/50W metal halide lamp, with backup power from solar panels, Exide SMF batteries, and a 7.5 kVA Kirloskar DG set. The tower also features RACON No. 6295, NAIS (AIS1 & AIS2), VSAT, and remote monitoring via PLC systems, ensuring robust maritime navigation support.

== See also ==
- Ports in Kerala
- List of lighthouses in India
