= Machilipatnam Lighthouse =

Lighthouse in Machilipatnam, India

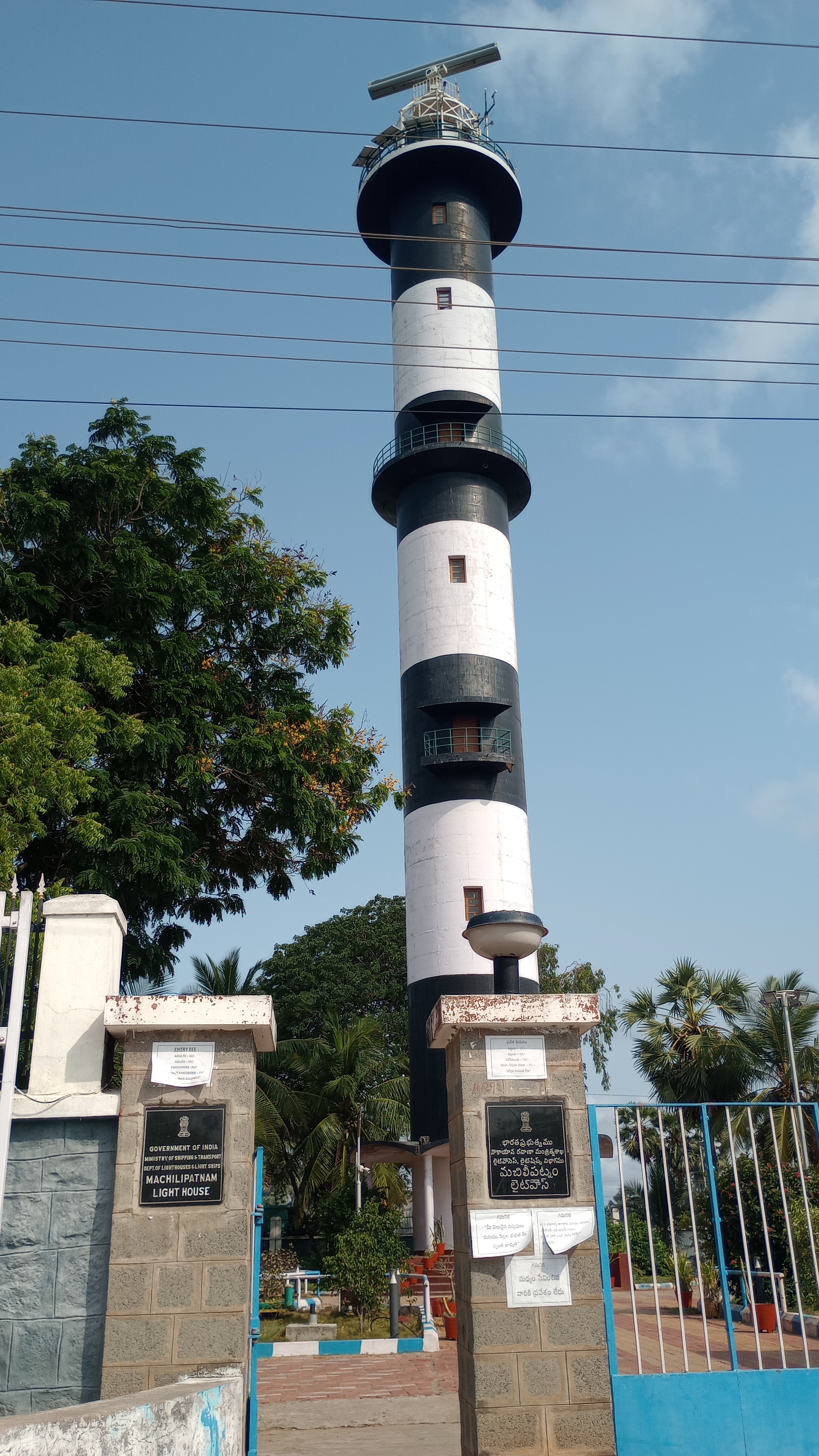
- Machilipatnam Lighthouse
- Location: Machilipatnam, Andhra Pradesh
- Coordinates: 16°14′48″N 81°14′01″E

Tower
- Height: 50 metres (160 ft)
- Shape: cylindrical tower with balcony and lantern
- Markings: black and white bands

Light
- First lit: 1858
- Deactivated: 1930
- Focal height: 49 m (161 ft)
- Light source: 150 Watts Metal Halide Lamps
- Intensity: 166000
- Range: 20 nautical miles (37 km; 23 mi)
- Characteristic: Fl(3) W 20s

Machilipatnam Lighthouse was first established in 1858, at Manginapudi Beach, approximately 11 kilometres (6.8 mi) from the town of Machilipatnam, India.

== History ==
The first light at Machilipatnam was commissioned in 1852 at a different location.

The current lighthouse was commissioned in 1984, replacing a smaller structure built in 1930. During the tsunami of 2004 that caused deaths at Machilipatnam, the tsunami waves reached the base of the lighthouse.

== Architecture and fittings ==
The current lighthouse is a 50 metres (160 ft) tall RCC structure situated around 50 metres (160 ft) above MSL painted with alternating black and white bands. It has a geographical range of 16.5 nautical miles and a nautical range of 20 nautical miles. Fitted with a metal halide lamp, the rotation speed of the light beam is three rotations per minute with an effective beam intensity of 166,000 candelas.

== Visit and facilities ==
The lighthouse is open for visitors. It has a powerhouse and staff quarters.
