= Pudimadaka =

Village in Andhra Pradesh, India

Pudimadaka pudi-madaka
- Neighbourhood
- Location in Andhra Pradesh
- Coordinates: 17°29′35″N 83°00′09″E
- Country: India
- State: Andhra Pradesh
- District: Anakapalli
- Established: 1896

Government
  - Type: panchayat
  - Body: sarpanch

Population (2019)
  - Total: 13,912
  - Rank: 112

Languages
  - Official: Telugu, Hindi
- Time zone: UTC+5:30 (IST)
- PIN: 531011
- Telephone code: 08924
- Vehicle registration: AP31
- Nearest city: vizag
- Lok Sabha constituency: Anakapalli
- Vidhan Sabha constituency: yelamanchili
- Climate: hot (Köppen)

Pudimadaka or Pudi Madaka is a village in Achutapuram mandal of Anakapalli district, Andhra Pradesh, India.

== Pudimadaka Lighthouse ==
There is a lighthouse at Pudimadaka village. It was first time commissioned in 1971 and renovated in 1991. The lighthouse was on a masonry tower of 26 meters height. It has a visible range of 27 nautical miles.
