= Sunk Rock Lighthouse =

Lighthouse in India

- Location: Mumbai, India
- Coordinates: 18.889797°N 72.832562°E

Tower
- Constructed: 1884
- Foundation: stone pier
- Construction: masonry tower
- Height: 22 metres (72 ft)
- Shape: cylindrical tower with balcony and lantern removed
- Markings: red and yellow checkerboard sample, white lantern
- Power source: solar power
- Operator: Mumbai Port Trust

Light
- Focal height: 20 metres (66 ft)
- Characteristic: Fl (2) WR 6s.

Sunk Rock Lighthouse is one of three lighthouses in the Mumbai Harbour off the coast of Mumbai, India. The tower is mounted on a stone pier and painted in a red and yellow checkerboard pattern, with the lantern and gallery painted white. Swimming races are often held between the Gateway of India and the Lighthouse, a distance of 5 kilometres (3 statute miles). The site is operated by the Mumbai Port Trust.

== See also ==
- List of lighthouses in India
