= Azhikode Lighthouse =

Lighthouse in Kerala, India

Azhikode lighthouse
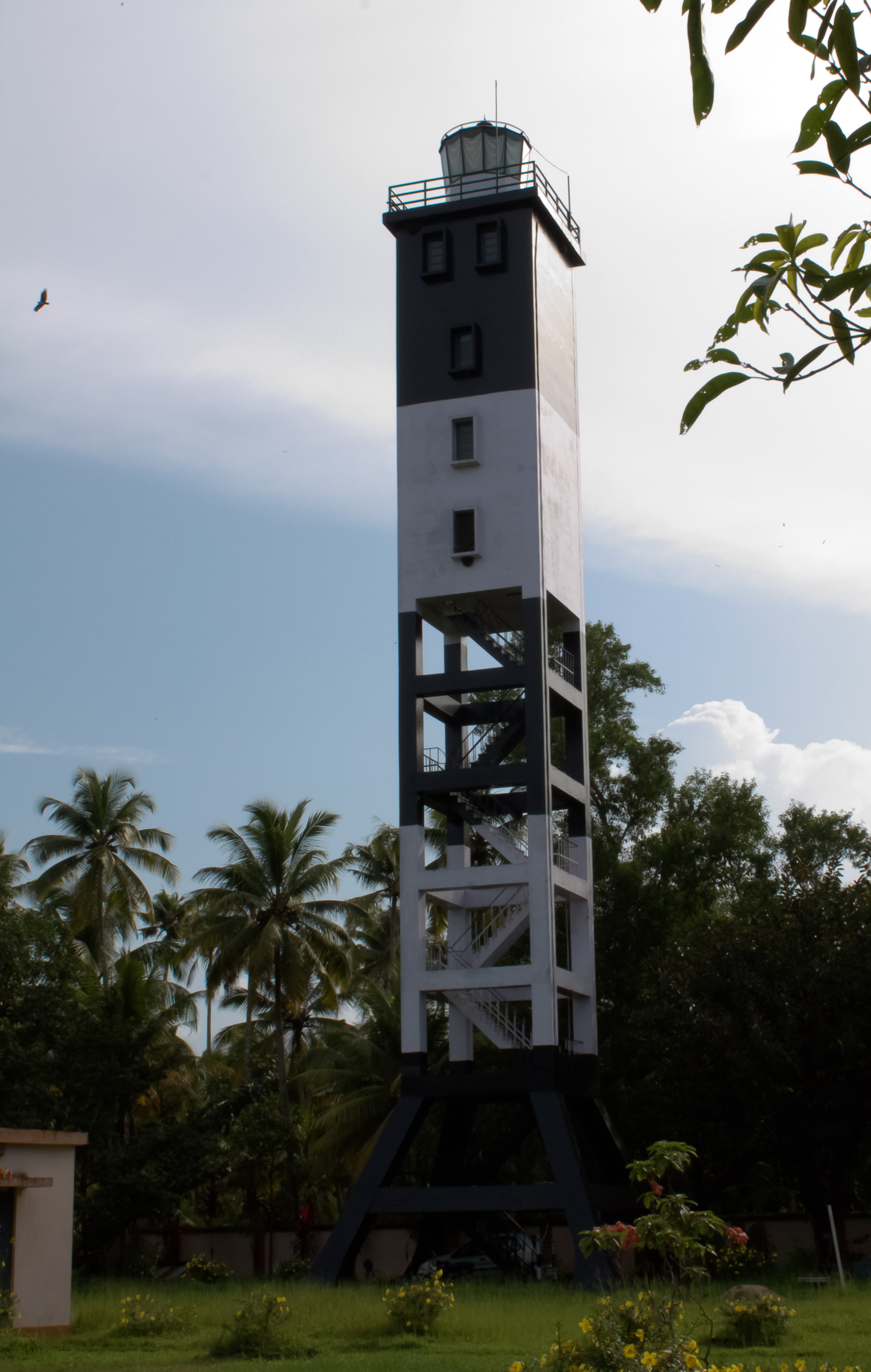
- Location: Kodungallur, Kerala; India
- Coordinates: 10°12′12″N 76°09′28″E

Tower
- Constructed: 1982
- Construction: concrete
- Height: 30 metres (98 ft)
- Shape: square tower with open framework base
- Markings: white and black horizontal bands, red lantern

Light
- Focal height: 34 metres (112 ft)
- Light source: 150W+ Metal Halide Lamp (220/250 V AC)
- Characteristic: Fl (3) W 20s.

Azhikode Lighthouse is situated about 8 km west of Kodungallur in Kerala. There was no lighthouse in the present location prior to this being inaugurated on 30 April 1982. The concrete tower of the lighthouse has a height of 30 meters.

== Technical details ==
There is a radio beacon installed at this lighthouse which came on air on 10 September 1981. The incandescent lamp was replaced by metal halide lamp on 30 September 1997. The direct drive system was also incorporated at the time. This lighthouse was earlier known as Periyar River Lighthouse. A fixed light of 11 miles range was exhibited from a mast of 96 feet high by the State Port department in 1964 near the Port entrance and it worked till the commissioning of the new light in 1982. Azhikode Lighthouse was proposed as a guiding light for Cochin Port. The radio beacon was discontinued and a differential global positioning system was commissioned at Azhikod Lighthouse in 1994.

== See also ==
- List of lighthouses in India
