= Oyster Rock =

Island in Mumbai Harbour, India

Coordinates: 18°54′8″N 72°49′39″E

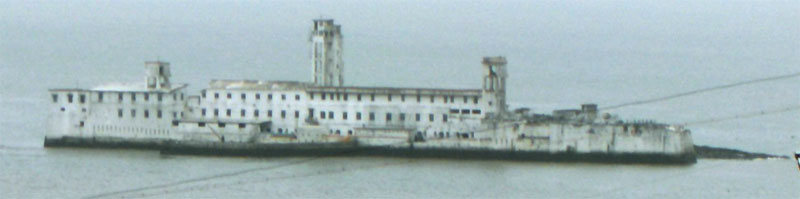
Closeup of the isle

Oyster Rock is an island in the Mumbai Harbour, Mumbai, India. It is heavily fortified, and owned by the Indian Navy. For a short while, the islet was used as a naval museum. Every time when the Admiral of The Fleet sails out or in with the Naval fleet, a guard of honour is conducted with a 21 gun salute with sailors standing on the entire perimeter of the island.

In 2008, the Mumbai Port Trust proposed to set up an International Cruise Terminal at Oyster Rock. However, in 2009, the Indian Navy refused to grant permission citing security concerns in the aftermath of the 2008 Mumbai attacks.
