= Mumbai Harbour =

- Neighbourhood
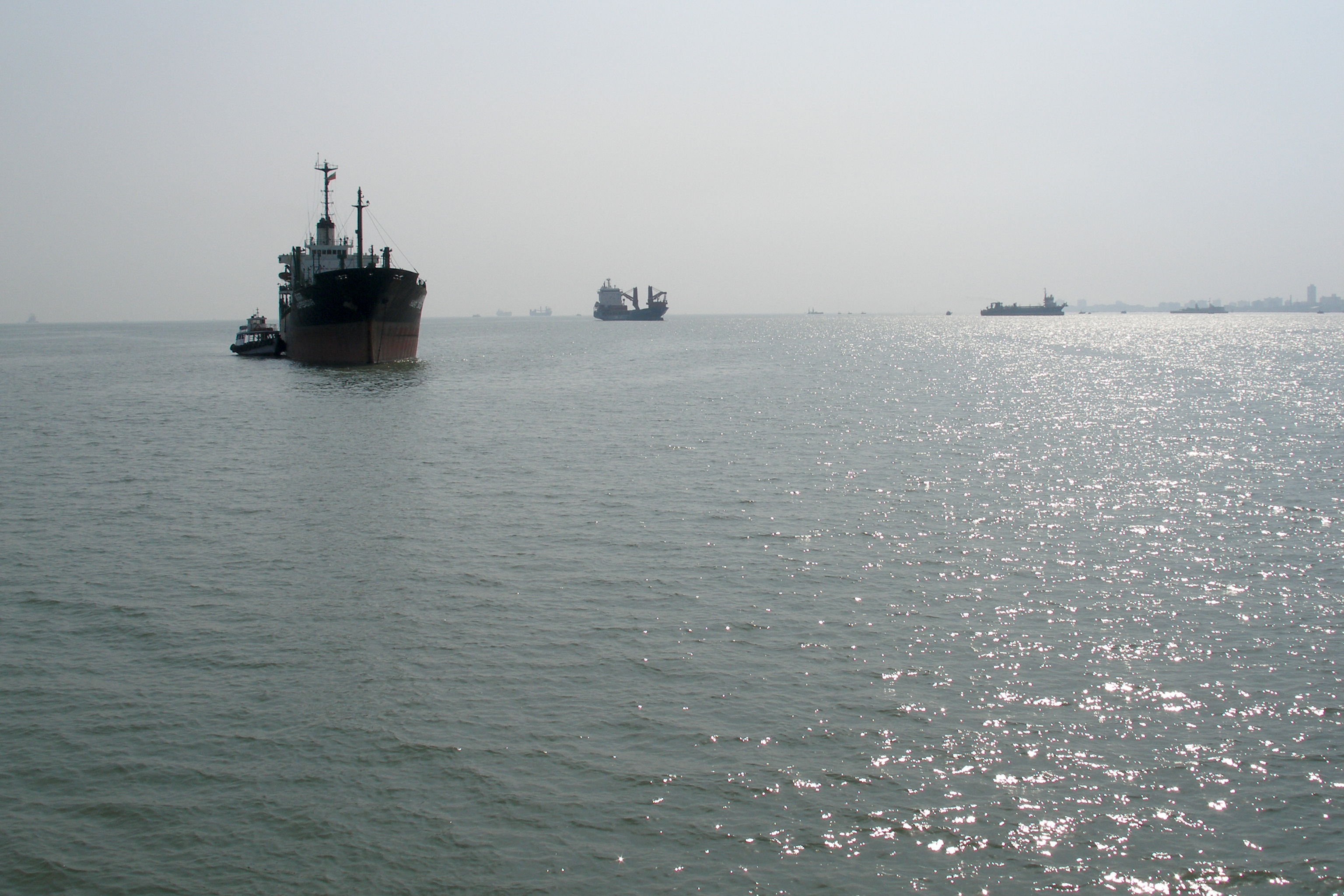
- Mumbai Harbour

- Location within Mumbai
- Coordinates: 18.96°N 72.85°E
- Country: India
- State: Maharashtra
- Metro: Mumbai

Language
  - Official: Marathi
- Time zone: UTC+5:30 (IST)
- Vehicle registration: MH-

Mumbai Harbour (also English; Bombay Harbour or Front Bay, Marathi Mumba'ī bandar) is a natural deep-water harbour in the southern portion of the Ulhas River estuary. The narrower, northern part of the estuary is called Thana Creek. The harbour opens to the Arabian Sea to the south. The historical island of Elephanta is one of the six islands that lie in the harbour.

Front Bay is the official name of the harbour, so named because the city started as a tiny settlement facing the harbour. The waterbody behind the original settlement, forming an arc between the former Colaba island and Bombay island, up to the Malabar Hill promontory or peninsula, was similarly called Back Bay.

Front Bay is home to the Mumbai Port, which lies in the south section of the western edge of the harbour. Jawaharlal Nehru Port and Navi Mumbai lie to the east on the Konkan mainland, and the city of Mumbai lies to the west on Salsette Island. The Gateway of India with its jetty for Elephanta is the most important tourist destination.

== Islands ==
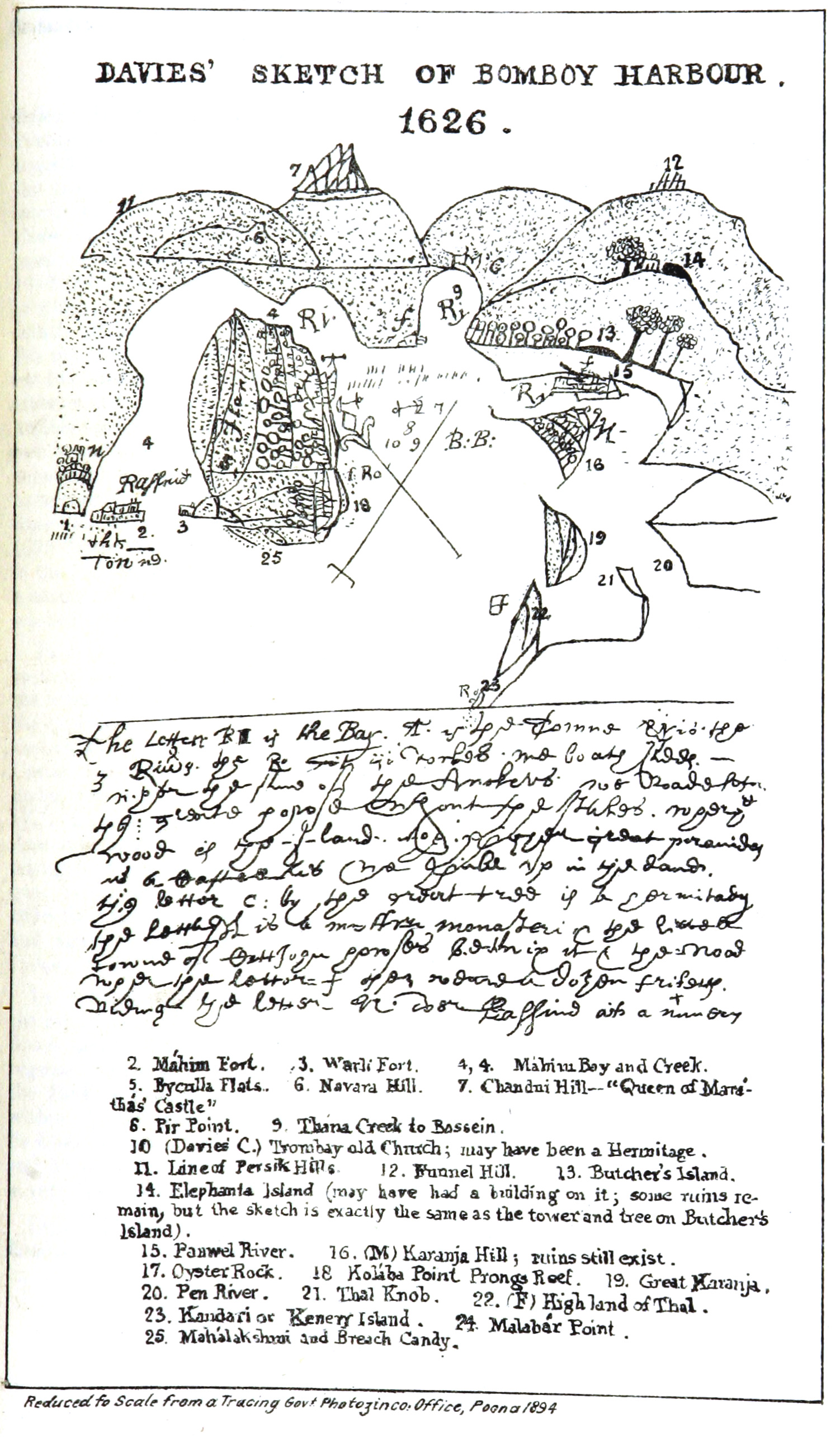
Bombay harbour 1626

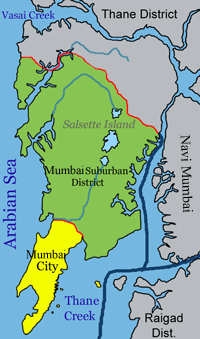
The harbour east of the city

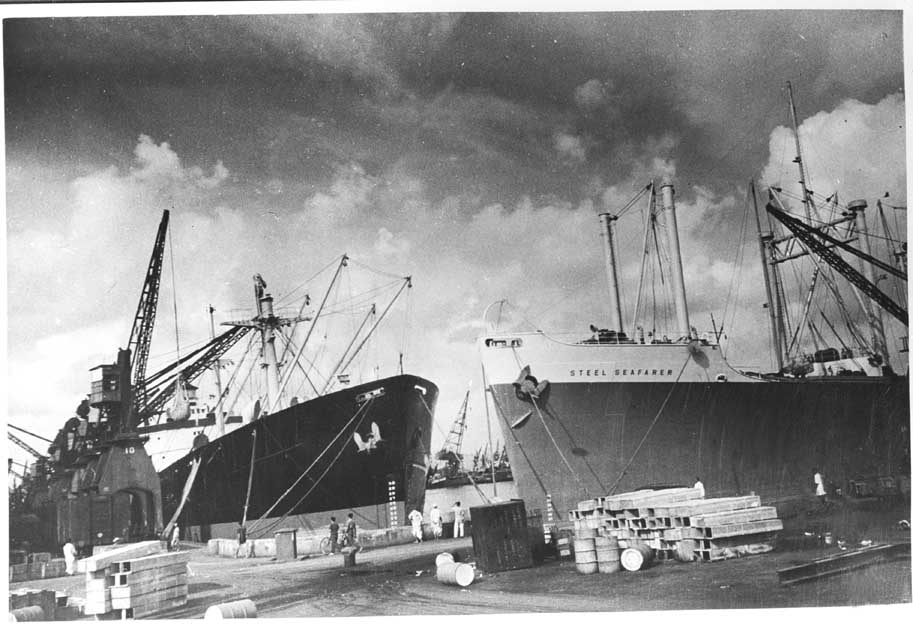
Two American Cargo ships docked at Bombay Harbour, 1948.

There are six islands in the Mumbai Harbour.

Butcher Island, also known as Jawahar Dweep, is used as an oil terminal by the Mumbai Port. It has jetties for tankers and various other infrastructure for offloading crude oil and for loading refined petroleum products. The island is restricted to port employees, and not open to the public.

Cross Island is a small, uninhabited islet just off the coast of the Dockyard Road. Though the remains of old fortifications are visible, the island itself is restricted to the public.

Gharapuri Island, also known as Elephanta Island, is the best known of the islands in Mumbai Harbour. The Elephanta Caves located on the island are a UNESCO World Heritage Site. The group of five larger caves have intricate Hindu religious rock sculptures. Two smaller caves have Buddhist religious sculptures. The carvings date back to between 5th and 8th centuries.

Middle Ground Coastal Battery is a small islet in the Thane creek. It features an antique coastal gun battery of the Indian Navy. The guns salute Indian naval vessels returning from deployments when they enter the harbour.

Oyster Rock is a small group of rock outcroppings in the harbour. The area has restricted access since it is used for naval exercises.

Salsette Island is the large island on which the cities of Mumbai and Thane are located. It is separated from the Konkan mainland by the Vasai creek and the Ulhas river. Mumbai was originally a distinct island from Thane, but reclamation of land has long since merged the islands. Powai Lake, Tulsi Lake and Vihar Lake are the largest lakes on the island.

== Mumbai Port ==
Mumbai Port (MbPT) lies midway (18°56.3′N 72°45.9′E) on the western shore of Mumbai Harbour. The port was the pre-eminent commercial port of India in the nineteenth and twentieth centuries. It is known as the gateway to India, and has been a primary factor in the emergence of Mumbai as the commercial capital of India.

== Ecology ==
Mangrove swamps line much of the northwestern and eastern shores of the harbour, and provide a rich habitat for wildlife, including thousands of migrating birds such as flamingoes.

== Pollution ==
Due to immense population pressures from the Mumbai metropolitan region and the extremely busy maritime trade, the Harbour is considered to be heavily polluted.

This includes reports of heavy metals flux found in the creeks adjacent to the harbour with the harbour acting as a sink for most of the pollutants.

== In Art and Literature ==
The abundance of fish in this area is recorded in a painting by Clarkson Frederick Stanfield of Bombay Harbour—Fishing Boats in the Monsoon., engraved by Edward Goodall and with a poetical illustration by Letitia Elizabeth Landon.

== See also ==
- Sunk Rock Lighthouse
