= List of national parks of India =

National Parks in India

National parks in India are International Union for Conservation of Nature (IUCN) category II protected areas. India's first national park was established in 1936, now known as Jim Corbett National Park, in Uttarakhand. In 1970, India had only five national parks. In 1972, India enacted the Wildlife Protection Act and Project Tiger in 1973 to safeguard the habitats of conservation reliant species. Further legislation strengthening protection for wildlife was introduced in the 1980s.

There are 107 existing national parks in India covering an area of 44,402.95 km^{2} which is 1.35% of the geographical area of the country. In addition to the above, 75 other national parks covering an area of 16,608 km^{2} (6,412 sq mi) are proposed in the Protected Area Network Report. The network of parks will go up 176 after full implementation of the above report.

== State-wise List of National Parks ==
State & UT	State Area (km^{2})	No. of NP	Area (km^{2})	% of State Area
Andaman & Nicobar Islands	8249	9	1,216.95	14.75
Andhra Pradesh	160229	3	1368.87	0.85
Arunachal Pradesh	83743	2	2,290.82	2.74
Assam	78438	8	3875.39	4.94
Bihar	94163	1	335.65	0.36
Chandigarh	114	0	0.00	0.00
Chhattisgarh	135191	3	2,899.08	2.14
Dadra & Nagar Haveli and Daman and Diu	491	0	0.00	0.00
Delhi	1483	0	0.00	0.00
Goa	3702	1	107.00	2.89
Gujarat	196022	4	480.12	0.24
Haryana	44212	2	48.25	0.11
Himachal Pradesh	55673	5	2,256.28	4.05
Jammu & Kashmir	163090	4	2432.45	1.49
Jharkhand	79714	1	226.33	0.28
Karnataka	191791	5	2,794.05	1.46
Kerala	38863	6	558.16	1.44
Ladakh	59146	1	3350.00	5.66
Lakshadweep	32	0	0.00	0.00
Madhya Pradesh	308245	11	4349.14	1.41
Maharashtra	307713	6	1,273.60	0.41
Manipur	22327	2	140.00	0.63
Meghalaya	22429	2	267.48	1.19
Mizoram	21081	2	150.00	0.71
Nagaland	16579	1	202.02	1.22
Odisha	155707	2	990.70	0.64
Puducherry	480	0	0.00	0.00
Punjab	50362	0	0.00	0.00
Rajasthan	342239	5	3,947.07	1.15
Sikkim	7096	1	1,784.00	25.14
Tamil Nadu	130058	5	827.51	0.64
Telangana	114840	3	19.62	0.02
Tripura	10486	2	36.71	0.35
Uttar Pradesh	490.3	1	490.00	0.20
Uttarakhand	53483	6	4,915.02	9.19
West Bengal	88752	6	1,981.48	2.23
TOTAL	32,87,263	110	44,402.95	1.35

== Andaman and Nicobar Islands(9) ==
Name	Image	Locations	Formed	Notable Features	Flora and Fauna	Rivers and lakes inside the national park
Campbell Bay National Park	Nicobar treeshrew - endangered species found only on the Great Nicobar Island Airport located near Campbell Bay	Great Nicobar Island	1992	Part of Great Nicobar Biosphere Reserve	Crab-eating macaque, Nicobar treeshrew	
Galathea National Park	Nicobar Pigeon- threatened species found only on Nicobar Islands	Great Nicobar Island	1992	Part of Great Nicobar Biosphere Reserve	Giant robber crab, Nicobar pigeon, Megapode	Galathea River
Mahatma Gandhi Marine National Park(Wandoor)	Joly Buoy Island part of the national park	Wandoor	1983			
Mount Harriet National Park	View of Wimberlyganj from Mount Manipur	Mount Manipur854yoifg	1987	Important bird area as attributed by BirdLife65g International The park is also a butterfly hotspot.	Andaman wild pigs, saltwater crocodiles, turtles, robber crabs.	
Rani Jhansi Marine National Park		Ritchie's Archipelago	1996			
Saddle Peak National Park	Saddle Peak from Kalipur beach	Saddle Peak	1987			Kalpong Dam Reservoir
North Button Island National Park		Button Islands				
Middle Button Island National Park		Button Islands				
South Button Island National Park		Button Islands				

== Andhra Pradesh(3) ==
Name	Image	Location	Formed	Notable Features	Flora and Fauna	Rivers and lakes inside the national park
Papikonda National Park	National Park seen from Godavari River	Near Rajamahendravaram	2008	Important bird and biodiversity area by BirdLife International	Royal Bengal Tiger, Leopards, rusty-spotted cat, King cobra.	Godavari River
Rajiv Gandhi National Park (Rameswaram)		Near Rameswaram	2005		Bengal tiger, Indian leopard,Elephantsand sambar deer	Penna River
Sri Venkateswara National Park	National Park along with Eastern Ghats	Near Tirumala, Seshachalam Hills and Tirumala Hills	1989		Leopards, sloth bears, sambar deer and mouse deer	

== Arunachal Pradesh(2) ==
Name	Image	Location	Formed	Area	Notable Features	Flora and Fauna	Rivers and lakes inside the national park
Mouling National Park		Siang Valley	1986	483 Km2	Forms the western part of Dihang-Dibang biosphere reserve	takin, goral, Indian leopard, Bengal tiger, barking deer, serow and red panda	Siyom River
Namdapha National Park	Scenery of snow-covered mountains from the park Red panda often seen in the park	Near Miao	1983	1985 km2	part of Mizoram–Manipur–Kachin rain forests	Sapria himalayana, Namdapha flying squirrel, red panda, dhole, Malayan sun bear, Indian wolf, Asiatic black bear, gaur, stump-tailed macaque, Assamese macaque, rhesus macaque.	Noa Dihing River

== Assam(8) ==
Name	Image	Location	Year	Notable Features	Flora and Fauna	Rivers and lakes inside the national park
Dibru-Saikhowa National Park	Swamp Forest	Near Tinsukia	1999	Largest Swamp Forest in North-east India	Feral horse, Wild water buffalo, Ganges river dolphin etc.	Brahmaputra River, Lohit River, Dibru River
Dihing Patkai National Park		Near Digboi, Margherita	2021	Declared as reserve under Project Elephant and largest lowland forest in India	White-winged duck, Slow loris	Dihing river
Raimona National Park	River passing through the park	Near Gossaigaon	2021	Part of Eastern Himalayan Foothills	Gee's golden langur	Sankosh River
Kaziranga National Park	Indian rhinoceros Royal Bengal Tiger Wild water buffalo & cattle egret	Near Kaliabor	1974	Declared as UNESCO World Heritage Site in 1985 Largest population of Indian Rhinoceros, wild water buffalo and Eastern Swamp Deer	Indian rhinoceros, Royal Bengal Tiger, Wild water buffalo, Asian elephant, Eastern Swamp Deer	Brahmaputra River, Mora Dhiplu, Dhiplu, Mora Dhansiri
Manas National Park	View of eastern Himalayan foothills from the park Herd of Elephants in the park	Near Barpeta Road	1990	Declared as UNESCO World Heritage Site in 1985 contiguous with Royal Manas National Park, Bhutan Also a biosphere reserve and Elephant reserve	Indian Elephants, Wild water Buffalo, Capped langur, Rare species such as,Assam roofed turtle, hispid hare, golden langur and pygmy hog	Manas River, Beki River
Nameri National Park	Landscape of the National Park Dendrobium Orchid bloomed in the park	NearBhalukpong	1998		Dendrobium Orchid, Bengal Tiger, Clouded Leopard, Asian fairy-bluebird	Kameng River, Other tributaries Nameri, Dinai, Diji etc.
Orang National Park		North bank of the Brahmaputra river	1999		The Great Indian rhinoceros, pygmy hog, Asian elephant, wild water buffalo, Bengal tiger, hog deer, Gangetic dolphin, Indian pangolin	Dhanshiri river
Sikhna Jwhwlao National Park		Near Kokrajhar	2025		Pygmy Hog, Hog deer, Indian crested porcupine, Asian elephant, Chinese Pangolin	Saralbhanga river

== Bihar(1) ==
Name	Image	Location	Formed	Notable Features	Flora and Fauna	Rivers and lakes inside the national park
Valmiki National Park	Himalayan Foothills from the park hydro power project in the park	Near Valmiki Nagar, Bagaha	1978	Home of Tharu people in India	Bengal tiger, Indian gaur, Indian rhinoceros, Asian black bear, Indian elephant, Indian leopard	Gandaki River, Sonha and Pachnad rivers, Burhi Gandak River, Pandai River etc.

== Chhattisgarh(3) ==
Name	Image	Location	Formed	Notable Features	Flora and Fauna	Rivers and lakes inside the national park
Guru Ghasidas National Park(Sanjay)		Near Ambikapur, Manendragarh, Chirimiri	1981	Largest national park of Chhattisgarh		
Indravati National Park(Kutru)	Indravati River	Near Dantewada	1982		Wild Buffaloes, Tigers, Hill Mynas	Indravati River
Kanger Ghati National Park	Kanger Ghati National Park entrance Tirathgarh Waterfall	Near Jagdalpur	1982		Indoreonectes evezardi	

== Goa(1) ==
Name	Image	Location	Formed	Notable Features	Flora and Fauna	Rivers and lakes inside the national park
Mollem National Park	Dudhsagar Falls in Mollem National Park	Near Molem	1978	Famous Dudhsagar Falls located in it and also the Mahadev Temple of Kadamba architecture is also located inside of it		

== Gujarat(4) ==
Name	Image	Location	Formed	Notable Features	Flora and Fauna	Rivers and lakes inside the national park
Blackbuck National Park(Velavadar)	Blackbuck herd crossing trails	Near Bhavnagar, Vallabhipur, Dholera, Dhandhuka	1976	A grassland ecosystem for conservation of Blackbuck, Lesser florican Successful conservation programs for the blackbuck, wolf and lesser florican, bustard	Blackbucks, Indian grey wolf, striped hyena, Bengal fox, golden jackal, jungle cat and many other small mammals	
Gir Forest National Park	Family of Asiatic Lion in the park	Near Sasangir, Tulsishyam, Talala, Gir Gadhada	1965	Only habitat of Asiatic Lion	Asiatic lion, Indian Leopard, Stripped Hyna, Golden Jackle	Hiran, Machhundri, Raval and Shingoda Rivers
Marine National Park(Gulf of Kutch)	Marine National Park during low tide	Near Dwarka, Bet Dwarka, Okha	1982	There are 42 island and park is situated on coral reefs	Corals, sponges, jellyfish, endangered sea turtles such as green sea turtles, olive ridleys and leatherbacks, dugongs, Indo-Pacific humpback dolphins, blue whales	
Vansda National Park	Vansda National Park Campsite	Near vansda city	1979		Leopard, Dhole, Rhesus Macaque, Common Palm Civet, Hanuman Langur, Small Indian Civet, Four-Horned Antelope, Wild Boar, Indian Porcupine, Barking Deer, Striped Hyena, Jungle Cat, Flying Squirrel, Pangolin and Indian Giant Squirrel.	There are 443 species of flowering plants. This includes teak, sadad, khakhro, kadad, humb, timru, kalam, bamboo, dudhkod, mahudo, behada, umaro, kusum, tanach, asan, shimlo, ambla, sisam, chopadi bondaro, etc. There is a variety of colourful orchids at Ambika river

== Haryana(2) ==
Name	Image	Location	Formed	Notable Features	Flora and Fauna	Rivers and lakes inside the national park
Kalesar National Park	Kalesar National Park jungle	Near Bilaspur(Yamunanagar district), Paonta Sahib	2003	Located in Sivalik Hills		Yamuna River
Sultanpur National Park	Lake inside National Park Group of Spoonbills at the park	Near Gurugram	1991	Declared as Ramsar Wetland in 2021		

== Himachal Pradesh(5) ==
Name	Image	Location	Formed	Notable Features	Flora and Fauna	Rivers and lakes inside the national park
Great Himalayan National Park	Great Himalayan National Park Valley and snow-covered mountain Bharal	Near Banjar	1985	Declared as UNESCO World Heritage Site in 2014 popular trekking and ecotourism destination	Bharal, snow leopard, Himalayan brown bear, Himalayan tahr, Musk deer	Sainj River, Parvati River, Tirthan River, Jiwa Nal River
Inderkilla National Park		Near Manali	2010			Beas River
Khirganga National Park	Alpine forest Kheerganga Trek Parvati River flowing from the Alpine Forest	Near Kasol	2010	Popular destination for Hiking, Canyoning		Parvati River
Pin Valley National Park	Pin Valley, Spiti	Near Karzey	1987	Cold Desert area	Cedrus deodara, Himalayan snowcock, Chough	Pin River
Simbalbara National Park		Near Paonta Sahib	2010		Goral, Sambar deer, Chital	

== Jammu and Kashmir(4) ==
Name	Image	Location	Formed	Notable Features	Flora and Fauna	Rivers and lakes inside the national park
Dachigam National Park	Group of Hangul grazing in Dachigam River crossing	Near Srinagar	1981	Only area where Hangul is found	Hangul, Thar, Leopard cat, Musk deer, Snow Leopard, Himalayan black bear, Himalayan brown bear, Otter	Sarband Reservoir
Kishtwar National Park		Near Kishtwar	1981		Himalayan snowcock, Brown bear	Marusudar River, Chenab River
Kazinag National Park		Near Baramulla	1992	Located on Line of Control	Markhor, Himalayan musk deer, Golden eagle, Snow pigeon, Flora- Deodar, Fir, Spruce, Kail	Jhelum River
City Forest National Park(Salim Ali)	Forest Rangers House inside the Park	Near Srinagar	1986	Turned into the Royal Springs Golf Course	Hangul, Brown bear, Indian paradise flycatcher, Himalayan Serow, Ring Dove, The Lesser Kestrel	Dal lake

== Jharkhand(1) ==
Name	Image	Location	Formed	Notable Features	Fauna	Rivers and lakes inside the national park
Betla National Park	National Park entrance	Near Medininagar	1974		Tiger, Indian bison, elephant, hyenas, monkey, leopard	North Koel River

== Karnataka(5) ==
Name	Notable Features	Formed	Fauna	Rivers and lakes inside the national park
Anshi National Park	Part of Kali Tiger Reserve		Great hornbill, tiger, leopard, black panther, bear, elephant.	Kali River (Karnataka)
Bandipur National Park	Dry deciduous forest is dominant. Also include moist deciduous forests and shrublands. It is part of the Nilgiri Biosphere Reserve Invasive Alien Species - Lantana bush, Parthenium		Chital, Bengal tiger, gray langurs, Indian giant squirrel, gaur, leopard, sambar deer, Indian elephants, honey buzzard, red-headed vulture	Kabini River, Moyar River
Bannerghatta National Park	The park is part of a wildlife corridor for elephants which connects the BR Hills and the Sathyamangalam forest. Moist deciduous forest valleys and scrubland on higher areas		Tiger, sloth bear, peacock, elephant, sambar deer, mouse deer, Leopard, Baboons, Reptiles, Asiatic Elephants, Birds, Butterflies, Nilgai, Wilddogs, Jackals, Wolves, Hyenas, Giraffe.Etc.	
Kudremukh National Park				The Tunga River and Bhadra River flow freely through the parklands
Nagarhole National Park(Rajiv Gandhi)	Kabini reservoir separates Nagarhole from Bandipur National Park		Carnivores - Bengal tiger, Indian leopard, dhole, sloth bear and the striped hyena. Herbivores - chital, sambar deer, barking deer, four-horned antelope, gaur, wild boar, and Indian elephant. Other mammals - gray langur, bonnet macaque, jungle cat, leopard cat, slender loris, small Indian civet and Asian palm civet, Indian brown mongoose and stripe-necked mongoose, European otter, Indian giant flying squirrel, Indian giant squirrel, porcupine, golden jackal, chevrotain, hare and Indian pangolin	

== Kerala(6) ==
Name	Notable Features	Fauna	Rivers and lakes inside the national PARK
Anamudi Shola National Park	The park is administered by Munnar Wildlife Division, together with the nearby Mathikettan Shola National Park, Eravikulam National Park, Pampadum Shola National Park, Chinnar Wildlife Sanctuary and the Kurinjimala Sanctuary, with Anamudi Shola providing connectivity between all these protected areas.	Elephant, Tiger, Nilgiri tahr, Gaur, Spotted Deer, Sambar, Grizzled Giant Squirrel, Hanuman Langur, Sloth Bear, Flying Squirrels	Pambar River
Eravikulam National Park	The land of “Neelakurinji”, the flower that blooms once in twelve years Anamudi, the highest peak of western ghats, is located here Vegetation - Rolling grasslands, with shola forests in upper parts	Nilgiri tahr, Neelakurinji lion-tailed macaques, gaur, Indian muntjac and sambar deer	Pambar River (Kerala)
Mathikettan Shola National Park	The park is located between other reserve forests like Eravikulam National Park and Pampadam Shola National Park	Elephants	
Pambadum Shola National Park	Forms part of Munnar Wildlife Division, together with the nearby Mathikettan Shola National Park, Eravikulam National Park, Anamudi Shola National Park, Chinnar Wildlife Sanctuary and the Kurinjimala Sanctuary It is a part of Palani hills Keystone species - Nilgiri Marten	Nilgiri marten, Nilgiri wood pigeon, Nilgiri langur, Nilgiri flycatcher, Blue rock-thrush	
Periyar National Park	An elephant reserve and a tiger reserve Located high in the Cardamom Hills and Pandalam Hills of the south Western Ghats The sanctuary surrounds Periyar Lake, a reservoir that formed when the Mullaperiyar Dam was erected in 1895. The park is made up of tropical evergreen and moist deciduous forests, grasslands and stands of eucalyptus	Malabar parakeet, Malabar grey hornbill, Nilgiri laughing thrush, Nilgiri blue robin, great hornbill, Malabar pied hornbill, lion-tailed macaque, hairy-winged bat	Periyar river, Pambar River (Kerala)
Silent Valley National Park	Located in Nilgiri Biosphere Reserve Home to the largest population of lion-tailed macaques Famous for "Save Silent Valley" movement	Indian bison, Travancore flying squirrel, Salim Ali's fruit bat, Stripe-necked mongoose, Blue-winged parakeet, Crimson-backed sunbird	Kunthipuzha River

== Ladakh(1) ==
Name	Notable Features	Fauna	Rivers and lakes inside the national park
Hemis National Park	Largest national Park of India	Snow Leopard	

== Madhya Pradesh(11) ==
Name	Location	Notable Features	Formed	Fauna	Rivers and lakes inside the national park
Bandhavgarh National Park	District Umaria	Very high tiger density, so the saying Gaurs reintroduced from Kanha National Park Panpatha wildlife sanctuary	1968	Bengal tiger, striped hyena, caracal, gaur, sambar deer, nilgai, barking deer, chital,	Sone River, Ban sagar Lake
Dinosaur Fossils National Park	Dhar		2011 Narmada River		
Ghughua Fossil National Park	Dindori district		1983		
Kanha National Park	Mandla district Balaghat district	largest of the state of Madhya Pradesh with area 941.793 km^{2}.	1955	Barasingha or swamp deer	Halo and Banjar rivers
Kuno National Park	Sheopur & Morena Districts Khathiar-Gir dry deciduous forests ecoregion	Area 748.761 km^{2}.	2018	Asiatic Lion Reintroduction Project, India's first cheetah sanctuary	Kuno River
Madhav National Park	Shivpuri District	Sakhya Sagar, a man-made reservoir within the park, has been designated as a Ramsar site since 2022.	1959		
Panna National Park	Panna District	Ken Gharial Sanctuary	1981		Ken river
Pench National Park		Pench Tiger Reserve	1975	Rudyard Kipling's 'Jungle Book' was set in this NP.	Pench river
Sanjay National Park	Narmada Valley	dry deciduous forests ecoregion, Sanjay-Dubri Tiger Reserve	1981		
Satpura National Park	Narmadapuram District	Bori and Pachmarhi wildlife sanctuaries	1981		-
Van Vihar National Park	Bhopal district		1979		

== Maharashtra(6) ==
Name	Notable Features	Fauna	Rivers and lakes inside the national park
Chandoli National Park	2004		
Gugamal National Park			
Nawegaon National Park			
Sanjay Gandhi National Park(Borivili)		, Indian Leopard, Rhesus Macaque, Bonnet Macaque, Spotted Deer, Hanuman Langur, Indian Flying Fox, Indian Hare, Barking Deer, Porcupine, Asian Palm Civet, Mouse Deer	
Tadoba Andhari National Park			
Pench National Park(Jawaharlal Nehru)			

== Manipur(2) ==
Name	Notable Features	Fauna	Rivers and lakes inside the national park
Keibul -Lamjao National Park	The world's only floating park.		Loktak Lake
Shiroi National Park	Famous for Shirui Lily; Tropical Forests all over except at hilltops where there are temperate forests	Tragopan, Tiger and Leopard	A number of rivers originate here

== Meghalaya(2) ==
Name	Location	Notable Features	Fauna	Flora	Rivers and lakes inside the national park
AK National Park	south of Garo Hills	Balphakram means 'land of the eternal wind' according to the myth of the Garos .	Wild water buffalo, red panda, elephant and eight cat species, including the tiger and marbled cat	grassland, bamboo forest, tropical deciduous trees and carnivorous plants like the pitcher-plant and Drosera	
Nokrek National Park	approximately 2 km away from Tura Peak, is located in the middle of the West, East and North Garo Hills Districts	UNESCO World Biosphere Reserve			

== Mizoram(2) ==
Name	Notable Features	Fauna	Rivers and lakes inside the national park
Murlen National Park	Is close to the Chin Hills. It lies north of Lengteng Wildlife Sanctuary in the same district		
Phawngpui Blue Mountain National Park	It bears the name of the mountain Phawngpui, often called the Blue Mountain of Mizoram, which is the highest mountain peak in the state, reaching 2,157 m		Chhimtuipui River flowing towards Burma

== Nagaland(1) ==
Name	Notable Features	Fauna	Rivers and lakes inside the national park
Inangki National Park	The name "Ntangki" is derived from the Zeme dialect of the Zeliangrong Nagas.	hoolock gibbon, golden langur, hornbill, Asian palm civet, black stork, tiger, white-breasted kingfisher, monitor lizard, python and sloth bear In 2022, Asian forest tortoises (Manouria emys) were reintroduced into Ntangki National Park in collaboration with the Turtle Survival Alliance and Wildlife Conservation Society India	

== Odisha(2) ==
Name	Notable Features	Fauna	Important landmarks inside
Bhitarkanika National Park	A ramsar site, Gahirmatha Beach and Marine Sanctuary are to the east, separating the swamp region and mangroves from the Bay of Bengal	Mangroves, saltwater crocodile, white crocodile, Indian python, black ibis, wild pigs, rhesus monkeys, olive ridley sea turtle, chital	Brahmani River, Baitarani River, Pathsala
Simlipal National Park	It is part of the Mayurbhanj Elephant Reserve, which includes three protected areas, Similipal Tiger Reserve, Hadgarh Wildlife Sanctuary and Kuldiha Wildlife Sanctuary. It is UNESCO World Network of Biosphere Reserves	Tiger, leopard, Asian elephant, sambar, barking deer, gaur, jungle cat, wild boar	

== Rajasthan(5) ==
Name	Notable Features	Fauna	Rivers and lakes inside the national park
Desert National Park		Chinkara (Gazella bennettii), Indian desert cat, demoiselle crane, great Indian bustard and MacQueen's bustard.	
Keoladeo Ghana National Park	UNESCO World Heritage Site Ramsar Wetland		
Mukundara Hills National Park	National Chambal Sanctuary is part of the national park		Chambal river, Kali river, Ahu river, Ramzan river.
Ranthambore National Park	ecoregion includes Khathiar-Gir dry deciduous forests	Tiger Reserve.	Banas, Chambal
Sariska Tiger Reserve	Khathiar-Gir dry deciduous forests ecoregion It is an important biodiversity area in the Northern Aravalli leopard and wildlife corridor		

== Sikkim(1) ==
Name	Notable Features	Fauna	Rivers and lakes inside the national park
Khangchendzonga National Park	UNESCO World Heritage Site. Houses the third highest peak on the planet, Mt. Kangchenjunga (Mt. Everest is first, Mt. K2 is second). The Zemu glacier, one of the largest in Asia, is located within the park.	Musk deer, snow leopard, Himalayan tahr, dhole, sloth bear, viverrids, Himalayan black bear, red panda, Tibetan wild ass, Himalayan blue sheep, serow, goral and takin	Teesta (to the east)

== Tamil Nadu(5) ==
Name	Notable Features	Fauna	Flora	Rivers and lakes inside the national park
Indira Gandhi Sanctuary and National Park(Annamalai)	Also called as Anaimalai Tiger Reserve	Tigers, leopards, elephants, wildboars, deer, dhole.		
Guindy National Park		Has more than 2000 chitals, 493 blackbucks and 84 jackals.		
Gulf of Mannar Marine National Park		has 8 species of whales and 21 small coral islands	Mangroove species like Rhizophora, Avicennia, Bruguiera, Ceriops and Lumnitzera.	
Mudumalai National Park	Part of Nilgiri Biosphere Reserve. Second oldest National Park in India. Largest National Park in Tamil Nadu.	Bengal tiger, indian leopard, dhole, golden jackal, sloth bear, Indian elephants, gray langur, Lion tailed macaque, bonnet macaque, gaur, sambar deer, chital deer, Indian muntjac, Indian spotted chevrotain, wild boar Rodents include the Indian giant squirrel and the red giant flying squirrel		Moyar River
Mukurthi National Park	Part of Nilgiri Biosphere Reserve and is also UNESCO World Heritage Site.The park was created to protect its keystone species, the Nilgiri tahr characterized by montane grasslands and shrublands interspersed with sholas	Nilgiri tahr		

== Telangana(3) ==
Name	Notable Features	Fauna	Rivers and lakes inside the national park
Mahavir Harina Vanasthali National Park	It is spread over 3605 acres	Black buck, cheetal deer, wild boar, peacock	
Kasu Brahmananda Reddy National Park	It is a located in the concrete jungles of Jubilee Hills and Banjara Hills in Hyderabad. The park has an approximate area of 390-acre (1.6 km^{2})	Peacock	Chiran Kunta
Mrugavani National Park	This park covers an area of 3.6 square kilometres (1.4 sq mi) or 1211 acres.	Chital, Sambar, Wild boar, Jungle Cat Civets Indian, Grey Mongoose	

== Tripura(2) ==
Name	Notable Features	Fauna	Rivers and lakes inside the national park
Bison (Rajbari) National Park			
Clouded Leopard National Park			

== Uttar Pradesh(1) ==
Name	Image	Location	Formed	Notable Features	Fauna	Rivers and lakes inside the national park
Dudhwa National Park	group Barasingha in the park Swamps of the park A trail through dense forest	Near Palia Kalan, Gola Gokarannath Located in Lakhimpur Kheri district.	1977	Park is home of world's half population of Barasingha Also a tiger sanctuary under Project Tiger	Barasingha, Bengal tiger	Sharda River

== Uttarakhand(6) ==
Name	Notable Features	Fauna	Rivers and lakes inside the national park
Gangotri National Park	Gaumukh Glacier		Bhagirathi
Govind Pashu Vihar National Park			
Jim Corbett National Park	First national park in India (established in 1936 as Hailey National Park). Report titled ‘Status of Tigers Co-predators and Prey in India’, released by the Union Ministry of Environment, Forest and Climate Change for 2018-19 revealed that national park has 14 tigers per 100 square kilometers which is highest in India. Dhikala grasslands		Ramganga
Nanda Devi National Park		UNESCO World Heritage Site, UNESCO World Biosphere Reserve	
Rajaji National Park		Mainly known for elephants, tigers, leopards and several species of birds, reptiles and mammals.	Ganga river
Valley of Flowers National Park		UNESCO World Heritage Site, Most beautiful national park in the world	

== West Bengal(6) ==
Name	Location	Notable Features	Fauna	Rivers and lakes inside the national park
Buxa Tiger Reserve	The Phibsoo Wildlife Sanctuary of Bhutan is contiguous to the north of BTR To the south-west, the Chilapata Forests form an elephant corridor to the Jaldapara Wildlife Sanctuary	"Terai Eco-System" Northern boundary along international border with Bhutan and eastern boundary touches Assam The fragile "Terai Eco-System" constitutes a part of this reserve Buxa, serves as an international corridor for Asian elephant migration between India and Bhutan Rajabhatkhawa Vulture Breeding Centre was established by Bombay Natural History Society to emulate the success of Jatayu Conservation Breeding Centre, Pinjore	Indian leopard, Bengal tiger, clouded leopard, giant squirrel, gaur, chital and wild boar Eurasian griffon, Amur falcon Endangered species include leopard cat, Bengal florican, regal python, Chinese pangolin, hispid hare, hog deer lesser adjutant, white-rumped vulture, slender-billed vulture, chestnut-breasted partridge, rufous necked hornbill, ferruginous pochard and great hornbill	
Gorumara National Park			The park is rich in large herbivores including Indian rhinoceros, gaur, Asian elephant, sloth bear, chital, and sambar deer	Jaldhaka, Naora
Jaldapara National Park			Indian rhinoceros	Torsa River
Neora Valley National Park	Connected to the Phibsoo Wildlife Sanctuary of Bhutan		red panda (EN)	
Singalila National Park	Tonglu mountain in the Singalila Ridge on the border with Nepal			Rangeet River, Rammam river
Sundarbans National Park		UNESCO World Heritage Site Ramsar site Tiger reserve		

== See also ==
- List of wildlife sanctuaries of India
- Ministry of Environment, Forest and Climate Change
- Indian Council of Forestry Research and Education
- List of National Parks in South Asia
- Botanical Survey of India
- Zoological Survey of India
