= Middle Button Island National Park =

Indian National Park

- Location within India
- Location: Andaman and Nicobar, India
- Coordinates: 12°16′32″N 93°01′34″E
- Area: 64 km^{2} (25 sq mi)
- Established: 1979

Middle Button Island National Park is an Indian national park located in the Andaman and Nicobar Islands. The park was created in 1979 and is situated about 200 km (124 mi) northeast of Port Blair, capital of the island group. The total area that the national park covers is about 64 km^{2} (25 mi^{2}). Along with the neighbouring islands of North Button and South Button, both also national parks, it forms part of the Rani Jhansi Marine National Park off the coast of South Andaman Island.

== Attractions and activities ==
The island has an oceanic climate moderated by the surrounding sea. The average temperature varies between about 20 and 30 °C (68 and 86 °F). The island receives much rain during the southwesterly monsoon season between June and October, and most visitors come between December and April. Access is available by boat from Port Blair and visitors should contact the park office for information on scuba diving facilities, entry permits, timing of visits and fees. There is no accommodation in the park but visitors may organise packages to sleep on board vessels, or may camp with prior permission from the park authorities.

== Flora and fauna ==
The island is clad in moist deciduous forest and surrounded by sandy beaches and shallow seas with clear water. Some of the trees and shrubs present include the rattan palm Calamus palustris, the climbing bamboo Dinochloa andamanica and Parishia insignis, Calophyllum soulattri, Artocarpus, Canarium, Dipterocarpus grandiflorus, Dipterocarpus pilosus, Endospermum chinensis, Hopea odorata, Bombax insigne, Sideroxylon, Aprosa villosula, Baccaurea sapida, Caryota mitis and Dinochloa palustris.

Among the animals found on land are spotted deer, water lizards and monitor lizards. Marine fauna found in the park include dugongs, dolphins, sea turtles, fishes and many species of coral abound. Blue whales have been reported off the coast.
