= South Button Island National Park =

National park in the Andaman and Nicobar Islands off the coast of India

Coordinates: 12°13′26″N 93°01′13″E

South Button Island National Park is a national park located in the Andaman and Nicobar Islands off the coast of India. The total area of this protected island is about 5 km^{2} (2 mi^{2}), which makes it the smallest national park in India. The neighbouring islands of North Button and Middle Button, off the coast of South Andaman Island, are also national parks.

== The park ==
South Button Island National Park is some 24 km (15 mi) southwest of Havelock Island, roughly a two-hour trip by motor boat.

== Attractions and activities ==
The island has an oceanic climate moderated by the surrounding sea. The average temperature varies between about 20 and 30 °C (68 and 86 °F). The island receives much rain during the southwesterly monsoon season between June and October, and most visitors come between December and April.

One of the main attractions around the tiny Island is shallow water coral reefs with high visibility. These tropical coral reefs are at depths as shallow as 6 ft (1.8 m), and the island is a popular site for snorkelling and scuba diving.

== Flora and fauna ==
Some of the trees and shrubs present on the island are the rattan palm Calamus palustris, the climbing bamboo Dinochloa andamanica and Parishia insignis, Calophyllum soulattri, Artocarpus, Canarium, Dipterocarpus grandiflorus, Dipterocarpus pilosus, Endospermum chinensis, Hopea odorata, Bombax insigne, Sideroxylon, Aprosa villosula, Baccaurea sapida, Caryota mitis and Dinochloa palustris.

The island is too small to support large terrestrial mammals but the sea is teeming with life. Among the animals that make their home here are dugongs, water lizards, sea turtles, dolphins and blue whales. The fish to be seen off-shore include snappers, sweetlips, lion fish, angel fish, butterflyfish, devil rays, manta rays and barracuda, as well as nudibranchs, octopuses and shrimps. Sea turtles breed here, as do the endemic subspecies of the edible-nest swiftlet (Aerodramus fuciphagus) and the distinctive white-bellied sea eagle (Haliaeetus leucogaster).

== See also ==
- Dr. K.K. Mohammed Koya Sea Cucumber Conservation Reserve
