= Charles Parish =

Anglo-Indian botanist (1822–1897)

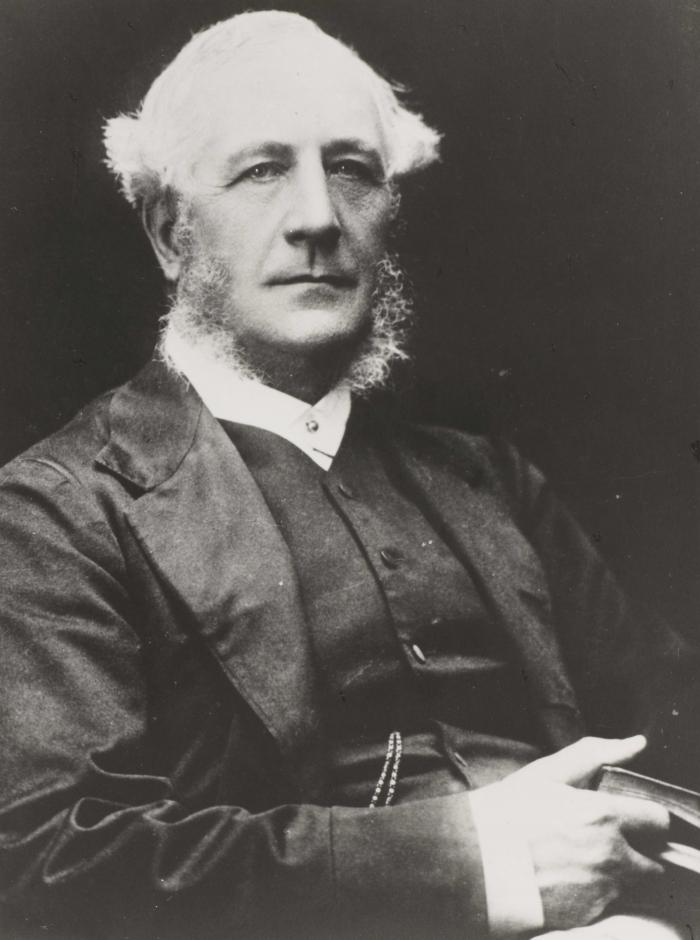
- Born: 26 January 1822; Dum Dum
- Died: 18 October 1897 (aged 75); Bishop's Hull
- Alma mater: St Edmund Hall
- Occupation: Botanist, botanical collector, botanical illustrator
- Spouse(s): Eleanor Parish

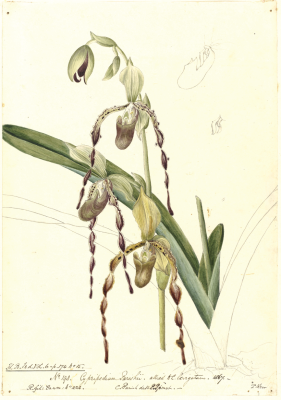
Paphiopedilum parishii (Rchb. f.) Stein, drawn by Charles Parish, painted by Eleanor Parish, from a plant flowering in Moulmein, Myanmar in 1867

Charles Samuel Pollock Parish (1822–1897) was an Anglo-Indian clergyman and botanist who served as chaplain to the forces of the Honourable East India Company in Burma. (Note: Burma is now known as Myanmar.) With his wife Eleanor he collected and painted plants, chiefly orchids, identifying and naming a number of species new to science. Several species are named in his honour.

== Early life ==
Parish was born in Dum Dum, near Calcutta, (Note: Calcutta is now known as Kolkata.) India on 26 January 1822 as the second son of the Reverend Henry Parish (1791–1873). He was educated in England from around the age of ten, and graduated from St Edmund Hall, Oxford University in 1841. He was ordained as a deacon on 7 June 1846 and as a priest 30 May 1847. From 15 August 1846 he was curate at West Hatch, Somerset, and from December 1849 had the same role at nearby Bickenhall and Orchard Portman.

== Burma ==
In 1852 Parish was appointed as assistant chaplain to the Honourable East India Company in the province of Tenasserim, (Note: Tenasserim Division is now known as Tanintharyi Region.) Burma, based at Moulmein, (Note: Moulmein is now known as Mawlamyine.) travelling there via Calcutta and Rangoon. In 1854 he married Eleanor Isabella Sarah Johnson, and subsequently the couple had seven children, all born in Moulmein: four daughters, one of whom died after a year, and three sons. When the East India Company ceased to exist in 1858, Parish continued his duties under the Crown. He spent 25 years in Moulmein, returning to England only once in that time, to settle his family in Somerset, in 1871 or 1872–1873. (Note: Sources vary on the date of his return to England. Reichenbach (1874) has 1871; Clayton (2014) has 1872–1873.) He was promoted to chaplain in 1863 and, on return from his English leave, became a senior chaplain.

During his service in Burma, he collected many botanical specimens, (Note: Parish's first consignment of specimens was lost when the ship carrying them, the Cape of Good Hope, was sunk in a collision; see List of shipwrecks in March 1859#23 March) notably Orchidaceae, for the Royal Botanic Gardens, Kew. He and his wife discovered and identified several orchid species new to science. He also collected plants for a commercial orchid nursery, Messrs Hugh Low & Co. (Note: Not to be confused with his son, also Hugh Low, also a naturalist.) of Upper Clapton, England. Plants were also collected on his behalf by Burmese people. He was involved in the naming of a number of species, (Note: 79 such names are listed on the International Plant Names Index (IPNI)) many in conjunction with Heinrich Gustav Reichenbach who wrote, in an 1874 paper titled "Enumeration of the Orchids Collected by the Rev. E. C. Parish [sic] in the Neighbourhood of Moulmein, with Descriptions of the New Species":

The rich Kew Herbarium contained several interesting specimens and sketches sent by the first-named gentleman [Mr. Parish]. When he came home in 1871 he brought with him a beautiful collection of careful water-colour drawings, with analytical sketches, which have proved exceedingly trustworthy. The collection of specimens and copies of the drawings were presented to the Kew establishment by their possessor. Having been invited to undertake the examination of the collection, I have compared them with the types preserved at Kew and with those in my own collection. It is my duty to acknowledge that Mr. Parish had done his best to name the plants correctly. I have therefore affixed to all the new species here described Mr. Parish's as well as my own name.

The Parishes both painted plants, sometimes collaboratively, including those in their garden at Moulmein. Two bound volumes containing 300 of their orchid paintings are kept at Kew. (Note: Kew catalogue number 114242.) Parish contributed a catalogue of Orchids to Francis Mason's 1849 work "The natural productions of Burmah: or, notes on the fauna, flora, and minerals of the Tenasserim provinces and the Burman empire". His contribution to the third, 1883, edition (titled "Burma, its people and productions; Notes on the fauna, flora and minerals of Tenasserim, Pegu and Burma") was significantly expanded, and included notes on algae, mosses and ferns.

== Later life ==
On retirement in 1878, Parish settled in Somerset, England.

He was awarded the Royal Horticultural Society's gold medal in 1885, at an orchid congress in London.

He died peacefully at his home, Roughmoor House, Bishop's Hull, on 18 October 1897.

== Legacy ==
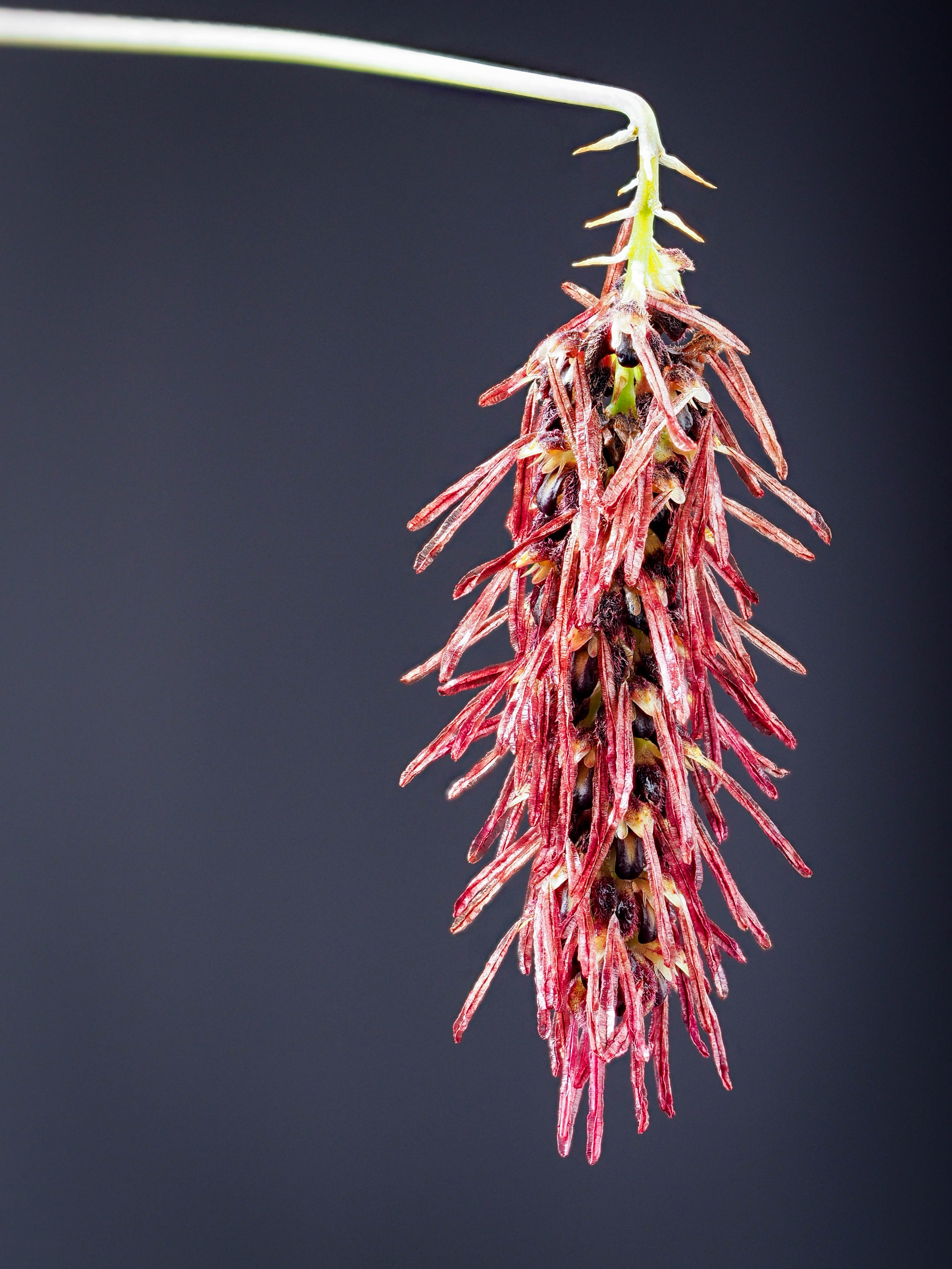
Bulbophyllum lemniscatum (inflorescence)

An obituary to Parish was published in The Orchid Review.

The genus Parishia was named in Parish's honour by Joseph Dalton Hooker in 1860. The type species is P. insignis, the first specimens of which were collected by Parish in the Andaman Islands. The same year, the orchid species Cleisostoma parishii was named for him (initially as Sarcanthus parishii), as were Coelogyne parishii in 1862, Dendrobium parishii in 1863, Phalaenopsis parishii in 1865, Phalaenopsis hygrochila (as Vanda parishii) in 1868, and Cymbidium parishii, Porpax parishii (as Eria parishii) and Peristylus parishii, each in 1874. Another, Paphiopedilum parishii, was named (as Cypripedium parishii) for him in 1892. Chiloschista parishii was named as late as 1988.

Of the species he collected, Reichenbach described Bulbophyllum lemniscatum as "the greatest glory of all the discoveries of Mr. Parish." Among the specimens held by Kew are around 45 type specimens.

The British Library holds two manuscripts by Parish, A Little Known Volcano, about Barren Island, which he visited in October 1861, and Burmah and the Burmese, which he signed and dated May 1879.

A biography of Parish, by Dudley Clayton, with plates of 168 of the paintings from Kew, was published by The Ray Society in 2017.
