= Button Island =

Button Island may refer to:

- Button Islands, in the Canadian Arctic Archipelago
- Button Islands (Andaman and Nicobar Islands)
- Button Island (Massachusetts)
- Button Island (Western Australia)
- Button Island, one of the Engineer Islands in Southeast Papua New Guinea
