= Kazinag National Park =

National Park in District Baramulla J&K

Coordinates: 34°10′0″N 74°2′0″E

- IUCN category II (national park)
- Location within Jammu and Kashmir Location within India
- Interactive map of Kazinag National Park
- Location: Baramulla, Jammu and Kashmir, India
- Area: 160 km^{2} (62 sq mi)
- Established: 1992

Kazinag National Park is a national park in Baramulla city of the Baramulla district in the Indian union territory of Jammu and Kashmir notified under Wild Life Protection Act 1972. It is part of a proposal for a trans-Karakoram peace park with Pakistan. The area of Kazinag National Park is 160 square kilometres, and it was commissioned in 1992. The national park is located on the north bank of the Jhelum River.

== History ==
Following the ceasefire after the Kargil War, and based on mounting pressure to conserve the rare Markhor wild goat, the Government of India, based on the Wildlife Trust of India, commissioned a new national park near Uri, in 1992.

== Climate ==
Kazinag has a temperate climate, with warm summers and cold winters, and a temperature range of -20 to +30°C. Precipitation is mainly in the form of snow in winter and rains in early spring with occasional showers during the summer. There are four distinct seasons: spring, summer, autumn and winter.

== Vegetation ==
Vegetation in Kazinag is dominated by coniferous forests with deodar (Cedrus deodara) at lower altitudes, fir (Abies pindrow), spruce (Picea smithiana) at middle to upper elevations and kail (Pinus wallichiana) is widely distributed from lower to upper elevations. Birch (Betula utilis) occur mainly in the subalpine zone whereas the other broad leaved forests including Prunus and Acer which occur in middle elevations and the horse chestnut (Aesculus indica) strands are distributed in lower elevations mainly along streams. The temperate scrub occurs at middle and lower elevations and is dominated by Indigofera, Spirea and Rosa. The sub-alpine and alpine scrub occurs at higher elevations and is dominated by Juniperus, Lonicera and Salix. Alpine meadows occupy the highest elevations. Other shrub species include Rosa macrofolia and Viburnum grandiflorum that are dominant along nallas in lower elevations.

== Mammals ==
Around 20 species of mammals, including some which are rare threatened or endangered are found in within Kazinag National Park. Key animal species sighted are markhor, Himalayan musk deer, Himalayan brown bear, Himalayan black bear, Indian leopard, Himalayan marmot, yellow-throated marten, and Kashmir flying squirrel.

== Birds ==
The Kazinag National Park is home to about 120 species of birds including the golden eagle (Aquila chrysaetos), Impeyan or monal pheasant (Lophophorus impejanus), cheer pheasant (Catreus wallichii), sparrow hawk (Accipiter nisus melaschistos), snow pigeon (Columba leuconota), cuckoo (Cuculus canorus), Himalayan pied kingfisher (Ceryle lugubris), lesser pied kingfisher (Ceryle rudis), nutcracker (Nucifraga caryocatactes), jackdaw (Corvus monedula), long tailed minivet (Pericrocotus flammeus), sooty flycatcher (Muscicapa infuscata), Kashmir red breasted flycatcher (Ficedula subrubra) and yellow throated martin (Martes flavigula).

== Butterflies ==
The park is home to 17 species of butterflies which include regal Apollo (Parnassius charltonius), common blue Apollo (Parnassius hardwickii), common red Apollo (Parnassius epaphus), brown argus (Ypthima hyagriva), meadow brown (Hyponephele pulchra), narrow-banded satyr (Aulocera brahminus) and large tortoiseshell (Nymphalis xanthomelas).

== Topography ==
It is located at 1,800 to 4,700 metres above sea level and the terrain is rugged.

== Kazinag Mountain ==
Kazinag Mountain, located in Langate Tehsil of Kupwara District, forms the line of control between India and Pakistan.

This splendid mountain, measuring 4,732 m tall, remains snow clad for most of the year. The main attraction is the Kazinag Spring and Kazinag Glacier It usually remains snow clad most of the year. On the top of it stands the historical Kazinag spring and Satkohl Nag which have been providing water to the Kehmil, Pohru, Mawar, and Talar rivers nearby, and some of the water goes to Pakistan through Nowkote.

== Best time to visit ==
This park has a temperature range of -20 to +30 degrees Celsius. Precipitation is in the form of snow in the winter, occasional showers during the summer and rains in the start of spring. The best time to visit for birdwatching is from May to September and those who wish to spot mammals should be there from April to May. The time period from June to August is also considered perfect to visit the location.
