= Button Islands (Andaman Islands) =

Group of islands in the Andaman Islands

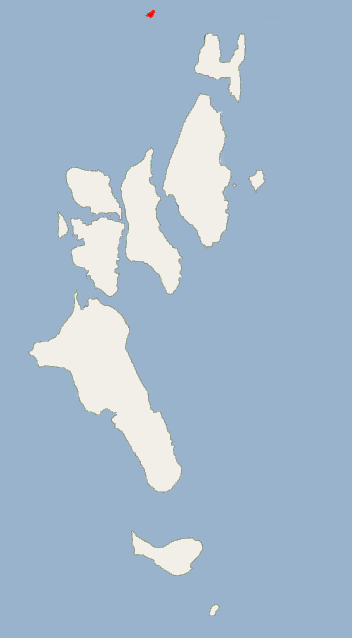
- Location within Ritchie's Archipelago

- Location of Button Islands in Andaman and Nicobar Islands

Geography
- Location: Bay of Bengal
- Coordinates: 12.270°N 93.045°E
- Archipelago: Andaman Islands
- Adjacent to: Indian Ocean
- Total islands: 3
- Major islands: North; Middle; South
- Area: 0.517 km^{2} (0.200 sq mi)
- Highest elevation: 50 m (160 ft)
- Highest point: Middle Button hill

Administration
- India
- District: South Andaman
- Island group: Andaman Islands
- Island sub-group: Ritchie’s Archipelago
- Tehsil: Port Blair Tehsil

Demographics
- Population: 0 (2011)
- Pop. density: 0.00/km^{2} (0/sq mi)
- Ethnic groups: Hindu, Andamanese

Additional information
- Time zone: IST (UTC+5:30)
- PIN: 744202
- Telephone code: 031927
- ISO code: IN-AN-00
- Official website: www.and.nic.in
- Literacy: 84.4%
- Avg. summer temperature: 30.2 °C (86.4 °F)
- Avg. winter temperature: 23.0 °C (73.4 °F)
- Sex ratio: 1.2♂/♀
- Census Code: 35.639.0004
- Official Languages: Hindi, English

Button Islands are a group of islands of the Andaman Islands. It belongs to the South Andaman administrative district, part of the Indian union territory of Andaman and Nicobar Islands.

== History ==
Several lighthouses were established on the islands.
There is a lighthouse at the tallest hill 48 m (157 ft) on North button island, established 1983.
There is a lighthouse at the tallest hill 50 m (164 ft) on Middle button island, established 1983.
There is a lighthouse at the tallest hill 36 m (118 ft) on south button island, established 1983.

== Geography ==
The islands belong to the Ritchie’s Archipelago and are located north of Outram Island.

The main islands of the group are: North Button, Middle Button and South Button.

Besides a variety of submerged corals, Dolphin, Dugong and Blue whale are important marine animals for conservation. These islands also forms abode to many species of avifauna and fishes. Coral dominate the islands as submerged fringing types.

== Administration ==
Politically, Button Islands are part of Port Blair Taluk. Rani Jhansi Marine National Park is located in the vicinity of the islands, which includes Middle Button Island National Park, South Button Island National Park, and North Button Island National Park.
