= Apitong =

Apitong may refer to:

- Apitong, Boac, a barangay of Boac, Marinduque, Philippines
- A barangay of Naujan, Oriental Mindoro, Philippines
- Barangay 92 of Tacloban City, Philippines
- Wood of the Dipterocarpus grandiflorus tree
- A character in the Philippine fantasy-themed television series Encantadia
