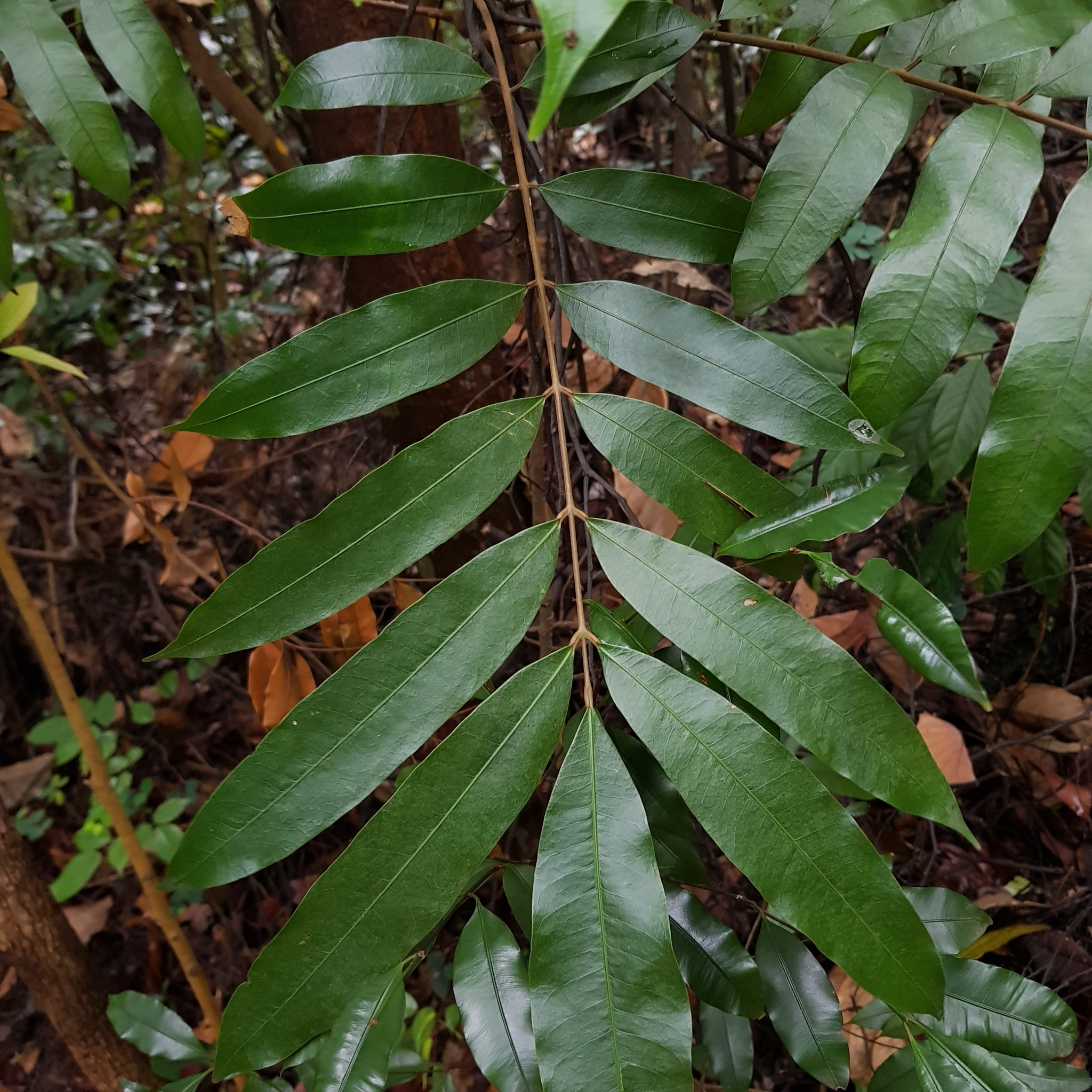
- In Singapore

Conservation status
- Near Threatened (IUCN 3.1)

Scientific classification
- Kingdom: Plantae
- Clade: Tracheophytes
- Clade: Angiosperms
- Clade: Eudicots
- Clade: Rosids
- Order: Sapindales
- Family: Anacardiaceae
- Subfamily: Anacardioideae
- Genus: Parishia
- Species: P. maingayi

Binomial name
- Parishia maingayi Hook.f., 1878

Synonyms
- Parishia polycarpa Ridl. Parishia oblongifolia Merrill; Parishia elmeri Merrill

= Parishia maingayi =

Species of tree

Parishia maingayi is an Asian tree species in the family Anacardiaceae. Records of occurrence include: Peninsular Malaysia, Singapore, Sumatra, Borneo and the Philippines. The Catalogue of Life lists one subspecies: P. maingayi minor.

This species may be synonymous with "Swintonia maingayi" Hook.f.
