= Parishia sericea =

Conservation status
- Least Concern (IUCN 3.1)

Scientific classification
- Kingdom: Plantae
- Clade: Tracheophytes
- Clade: Angiosperms
- Clade: Eudicots
- Clade: Rosids
- Order: Sapindales
- Family: Anacardiaceae
- Genus: Parishia
- Species: P. sericea

Binomial name
- Parishia sericea Ridl.

Species of flowering plant

Parishia sericea is a flowering plant in the family Anacardiaceae. It is native to Borneo.

== Description ==
Parishia sericea grows as a tree up to 25 m (80 ft) tall, with a trunk diameter of up to 40 cm (16 in). It has buttress roots. The bark is scaly. The leathery leaves are lanceolate, ovate or oblong and measure up to 17 cm (7 in) long and to 6.5 cm (2.6 in) wide. The brown fruits are ellipsoid and measure up to 5.7 cm (2 in) long.

== Taxonomy ==
Parishia sericea was described by English botanist Henry Nicholas Ridley in the then Kew Bulletin of Miscellaneous Information in 1933. The type specimen was collected in Sarawak, Borneo. The specific epithet sericea means 'silky' (sericeous).

== Distribution and habitat ==
Parishia sericea is endemic to Borneo. Its habitat is in hill and lowland forests, to elevations of 750 m (2,500 ft).

== Conservation ==
Parishia sericea has been assessed as least concern on the IUCN Red List. It is threatened by deforestation and by conversion of land for plantations and farming. However, It is present in several protected areas.
