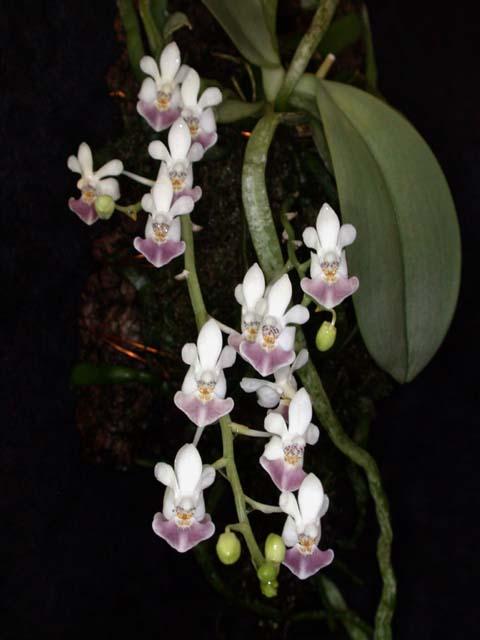
- Flower of Phalaenopsis parishii

Scientific classification
- Kingdom: Plantae
- Clade: Tracheophytes
- Clade: Angiosperms
- Clade: Monocots
- Order: Asparagales
- Family: Orchidaceae
- Subfamily: Epidendroideae
- Genus: Phalaenopsis
- Species: P. parishii

Binomial name
- Phalaenopsis parishii Rchb.f. (1865)

Synonyms
- Grafia parishii (Rchb.f.) A.D.Hawkes; Polychilos parishii (Rchb.f.) Shim; Aerides decumbens Griff.; Kingiella decumbens (Griff.) Rolfe; Biermannia decumbens (Griff.) Tang & F.T.Wang ex Merr. & Metcalf; Phalaenopsis decumbens (Griff.) Holttum; Kingidium decumbens (Griff.) P.F.Hunt; Polychilos decumbens (Griff.) Shim

= Phalaenopsis parishii =

Species of orchid

Phalaenopsis parishii is a species of orchid found from the eastern Himalaya to Indochina.

It was named by Heinrich Gustav Reichenbach in honour of the botanist and plant collector Charles Parish in 1865.
