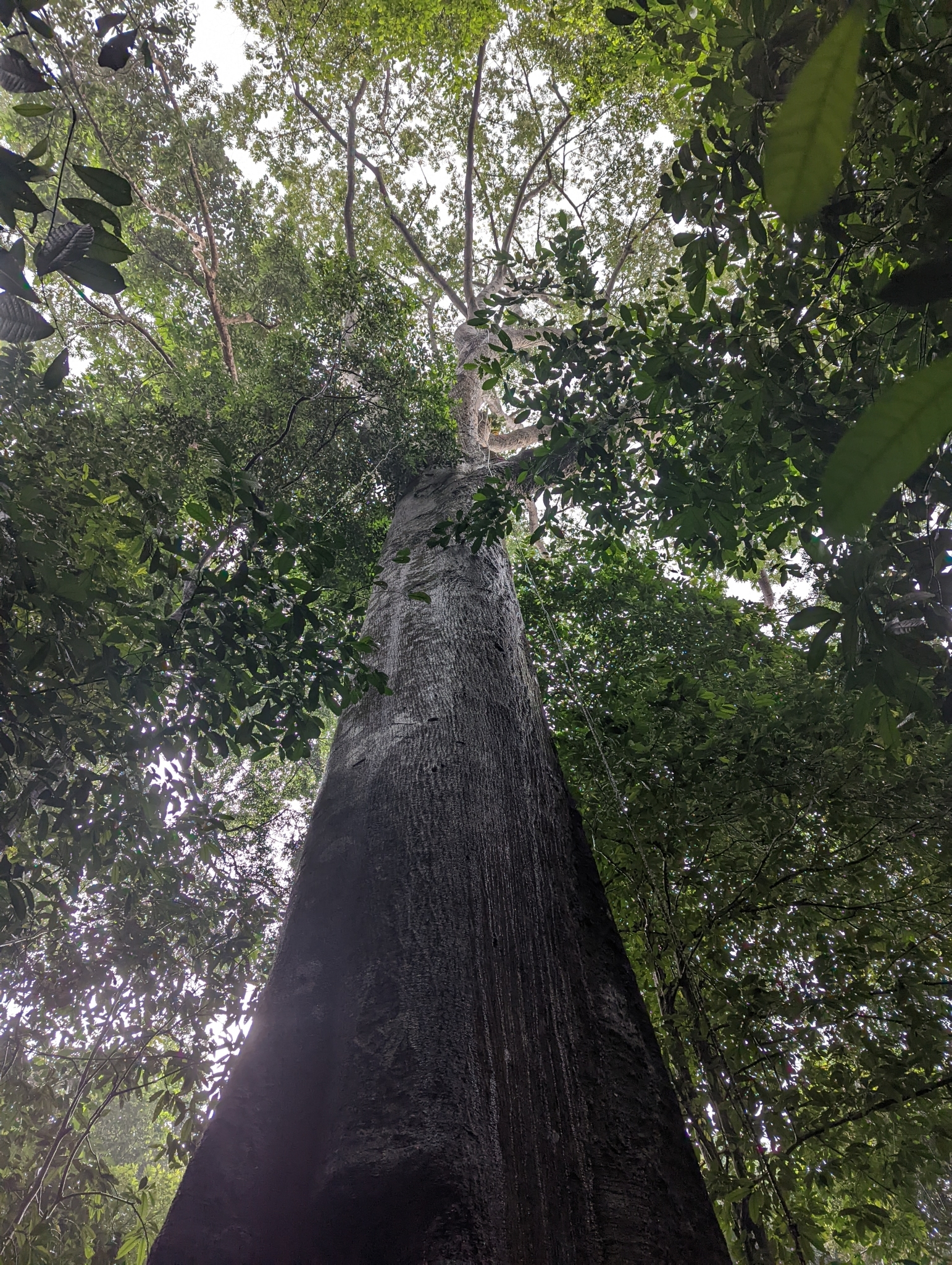
- Parishia insignis

Scientific classification
- Kingdom: Plantae
- Clade: Embryophytes
- Clade: Tracheophytes
- Clade: Angiosperms
- Clade: Eudicots
- Clade: Rosids
- Order: Sapindales
- Family: Anacardiaceae
- Subfamily: Anacardioideae
- Genus: Parishia; Hook.f.

= Parishia =

Genus of flowering plants

Parishia is an Asian plant genus in the family Anacardiaceae, subfamily Anacardioideae. Species are native to Indo-China and Malesia. It was named in 1860, by Joseph Dalton Hooker, in honour of the botanist and plant collector Charles Samuel Pollock Parish.

The type species is P. insignis, the first specimens of which were collected by Parish in the Andaman Islands.

== Species ==
As of April 2026, Plants of the World Online accepted these species:

- Parishia coriacea P.S.Ashton
- Parishia dinghouiana Kochummen
- Parishia insignis Hook.f. - type species
- Parishia maingayi Hook.f.
- Parishia malabog Merr.
- Parishia paucijuga Engl.
- Parishia sericea Ridl.
- Parishia trifoliolata Kochummen
