= Parishia trifoliolata =

Conservation status
- Endangered (IUCN 3.1)

Scientific classification
- Kingdom: Plantae
- Clade: Embryophytes
- Clade: Tracheophytes
- Clade: Angiosperms
- Clade: Eudicots
- Clade: Rosids
- Order: Sapindales
- Family: Anacardiaceae
- Genus: Parishia
- Species: P. trifoliolata

Binomial name
- Parishia trifoliolata Kochummen

Species of flowering plant

Parishia trifoliolata is a flowering plant in the family Anacardiaceae. It is native to Borneo.

== Description ==
Parishia trifoliolata grows as a tree up to 12 m (40 ft) tall, with a trunk diameter of up to 10 cm (4 in). It has brown twigs. The leathery leaves are oblong and measure up to 21 cm (8 in) long and to 15 cm (6 in) wide. The fruits are ovoid.

== Taxonomy ==
Parishia trifoliolata was described by Malaysian botanist Kizhakkedathu Mathai Kochummen in 1996. The type specimen was collected in Sarawak. The specific epithet trifoliolata means 'three leaflets', referring to the leaves.

== Distribution and habitat ==
Parishia trifoliolata is endemic to Borneo, where it is confined to Sarawak. Its habitat is in lowland kerangas forests, to 100 m (300 ft) elevation.

== Conservation ==
Parishia trifoliolata has been assessed as endangered on the IUCN Red List. It is threatened by conversion of land for plantations including for palm oil. The species is not known to be harvested for its timber or other purposes. Parishia trifoliolata is present in one protected area, Samunsam Wildlife Sanctuary.
