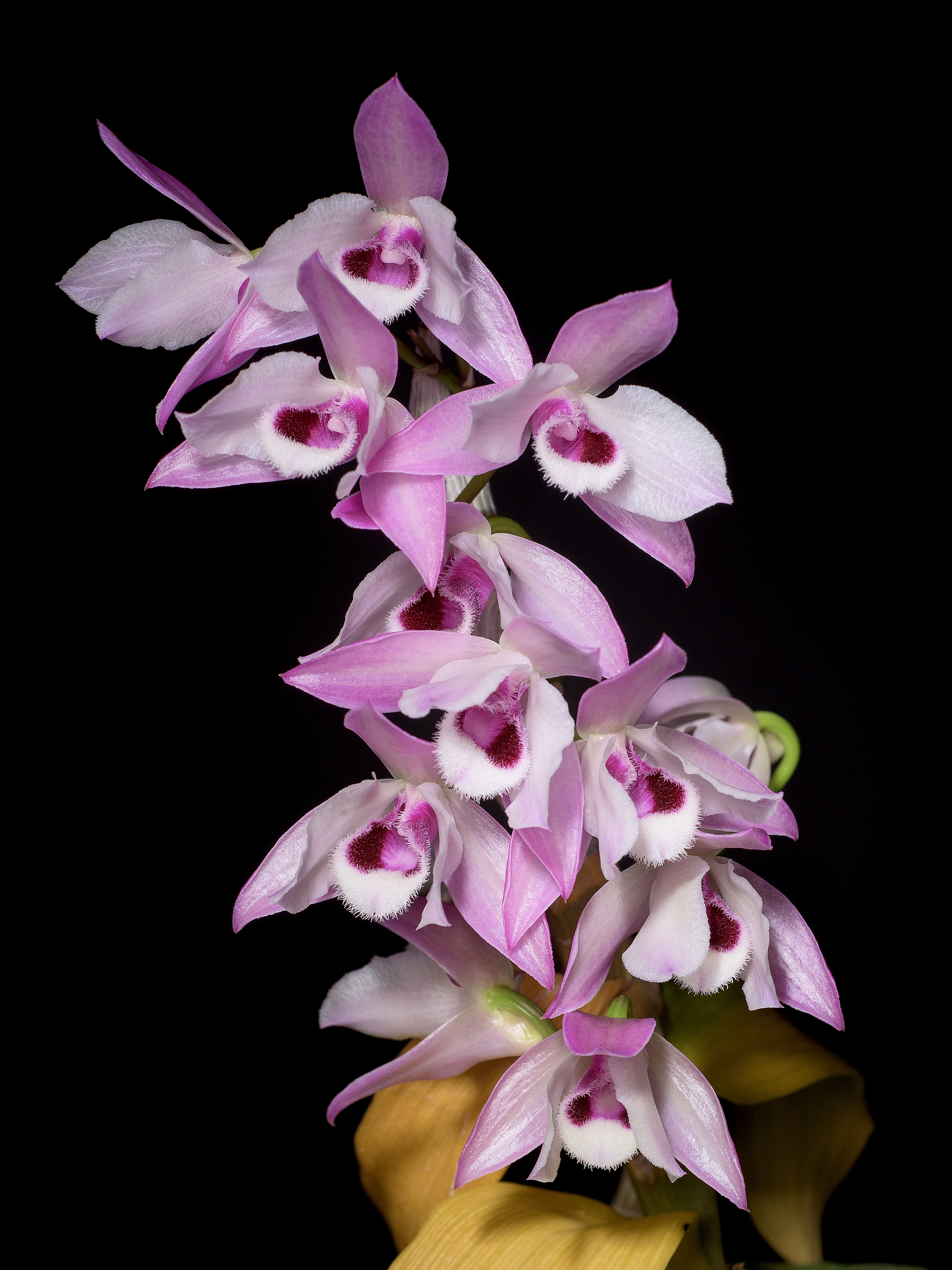

Scientific classification
- Kingdom: Plantae
- Clade: Tracheophytes
- Clade: Angiosperms
- Clade: Monocots
- Order: Asparagales
- Family: Orchidaceae
- Subfamily: Epidendroideae
- Genus: Dendrobium
- Species: D. parishii

Binomial name
- Dendrobium parishii Rchb.f. (1863)

Synonyms
- Dendrobium rhodopterygium Rchb.f. (1875); Dendrobium polyphlebium Rchb.f. (1887); Callista rhodopterygia (Rchb.f.) Kuntze (1891); Callista parishii (Rchb.f.) Kuntze (1891)

= Dendrobium parishii =

Parish's dendrobium

Species of orchid

Dendrobium parishii (Parish's dendrobium) is a species of orchid native to Asia.

It was named by Heinrich Gustav Reichenbach in honour of the botanist and plant collector Charles Parish, in 1863.

It is native to the Eastern Himalayas (Assam, Arunachal Pradesh, northern Bangladesh), China (Yunnan, Guizhou) and Indochina (Thailand, Myanmar, Laos, Cambodia, and Vietnam).
