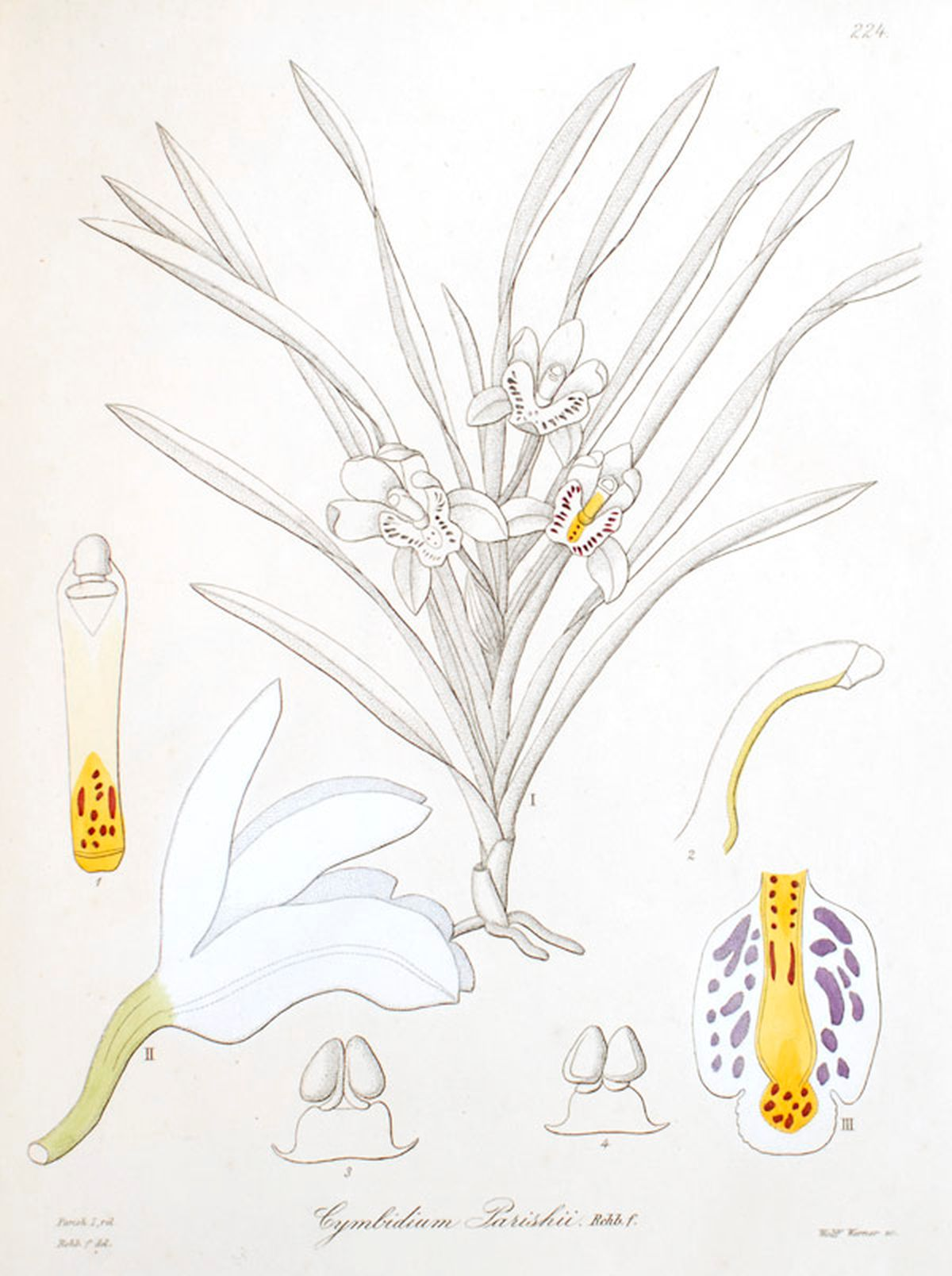

Scientific classification
- Kingdom: Plantae
- Clade: Tracheophytes
- Clade: Angiosperms
- Clade: Monocots
- Order: Asparagales
- Family: Orchidaceae
- Subfamily: Epidendroideae
- Genus: Cymbidium
- Species: C. parishii

Binomial name
- Cymbidium parishii Rchb.f. (1874)

Synonyms
- Cyperorchis parishii (Rchb.f.) Schltr. (1924)

= Cymbidium parishii =

Species of orchid

Cymbidium parishii is a species of orchid. It is found in Myanmar. In 1859, Charles Parish discovered it near Moulmein, but it was not named or published until 1872 and 1874, respectively, by Heinrich Gustav Reichenbach.
