= Inderkilla National Park =

National park in Himachal Pradesh, India

Coordinates: 32.23°N 77.41°E

- Location within Himachal Pradesh Location within India
- Interactive map of Inderkilla National Park
- Location: Himachal Pradesh, India
- Area: 46.1 km^{2} (17.8 sq mi)
- Established: 2010

Inderkilla National Park is a national park in Himachal Pradesh, India, established in 2010. It covers an area of about 104 square kilometres (40 sq mi). The park is located in Kullu district, about 46 km (30 mi) from Kullu–Manali Airport.

Rare mammals live here, such as brown and black bears, leopards and various mountain deer and goats. Over 250 species of birds have been recorded in the park.
