= Rajbari National Park =

National park in the Trishna Wildlife Sanctuary, Tripura, India

- Location within Tripura Location within India
- Interactive map of Rajbari National Park
- Location: Tripura, India
- Nearest town: Belonia
- Coordinates: 23.28°N 91.40°E
- Area: 31.63 square kilometres (12.21 sq mi)
- Established: 2007; 19 years ago
- Governing body: Tripura Forest Development & Plantation Corporation Limited

Rajbari (Bison) National Park is a national park in the Trishna Wildlife Sanctuary, in Tripura, India. It covers an area of about 31.63 square kilometres (12.21 sq mi).

== Biodiversity ==
The park is very famous across the country owing to its picturesque surroundings. It is one of the many places in India where one could witness Mother Nature at her best. One can expect to come across various wild animals including the world-famous Indian Gaur (also known as bison), deer, Golden langurs, Pheasants, and many such endearing species. The Bison reserve was entrenched in the Sanctuary to protect the endangered species. With the establishment of this reserve, the primary goal was to restore the natural living habitat of the Bison and strengthening laws put forth for the protection of them from poachers. The park receives plenty of water from the many rivulets and water bodies situated in the sanctuary. This supply for water ensures a regular and constant supply for nourishment to the plant and animal species.

== Flora and fauna ==
The sort of vegetation found in the Sanctuary is of great diversity. There are several herbs, shrubs, tree species, climbers etc. To be exact, there are 230 trees, 110 shrubs, 150 climbers and 400 herbs found in the sanctuary. Four types of forests can be found in this Sanctuary, they are

- Tropical Semi-Evergreen Forest,
- East Himalayan lower Bhabar sal,
- Moist mixed deciduous Forest
- Savannah woodland.

Bamboo is abundantly available in this sanctuary, as they are a big favourite among the bison. Along with this, the park is known to have a rich floral diversity as well, and many of these species have immense medicinal value, such as Tulsi, Rudraksha, Kalmegh and many more
Bison, gibbons, langurs, wild boars, wild cats, leopards etc. are some of the animal species that can be spotted at the Park. One must also keep a lookout for the captivating Pheasant-tailed Jacana, White-breasted Kingfisher, Indian Black drongo, Tailorbird, Jungle Myna, Hornbill, Doves, and many such species.
