= Parishia dinghouiana =

Conservation status
- Data Deficient (IUCN 3.1)

Scientific classification
- Kingdom: Plantae
- Clade: Embryophytes
- Clade: Tracheophytes
- Clade: Angiosperms
- Clade: Eudicots
- Clade: Rosids
- Order: Sapindales
- Family: Anacardiaceae
- Genus: Parishia
- Species: P. dinghouiana

Binomial name
- Parishia dinghouiana Kochummen

Species of flowering plant

Parishia dinghouiana is a flowering plant in the family Anacardiaceae. It is native to Borneo.

== Description ==
Parishia dinghouiana grows as a tree up to 15 m (50 ft) tall, with a trunk diameter of up to 30 cm (12 in). The leaves are oblong and measure up to 18.5 cm (7 in) long and 7.5 cm (3.0 in) wide. The velvety fruits are ovoid with calyx lobes measuring up to 5.5 cm (2.2 in) long.

== Taxonomy ==
Parishia dinghouiana was described by Malaysian botanist Kizhakkedathu Mathai Kochummen in Sandakania in 1996. The type specimen was collected in Kuching District, Borneo. The specific epithet honours the Dutch botanist Ding Hou.

== Distribution and habitat ==
Parishia dinghouiana is endemic to Borneo, where it is confined to the Kuching District of Sarawak. Its habitat is in lowland forests, at elevations of 100–150 m (300–500 ft).

== Conservation ==
Parishia dinghouiana has been assessed as data deficient on the IUCN Red List. It is possibly at risk from threats to its forest habitat, such as from residential and industrial development. However, detailed information on the species is limited.
