= Clouded Leopard National Park =

National park in Tripura, India

- Location within Tripura Location within India
- Interactive map of Clouded Leopard National Park
- Location: Tripura, India
- Coordinates: 23°40′5.60″N 91°19′21.16″E
- Area: 5.08 square kilometres (1.96 sq mi)
- Established: 2007
- Governing body: Tripura Forest Development & Plantation Corporation Limited

Clouded Leopard National Park is a national park in the Sepahijala Wildlife Sanctuary Tripura, India. It covers an area of about 5.08 square kilometres (1.96 sq mi) and is home to four species of primate monkey including Phayre's langur.

The National Park is 28 km from the State's Capital Agartala. The nearest airport is Maharaja Bir Bikram Airport which is 35 km away.
