= Awasani railway station =

Railway station in Bihar, India

Awasani Awasani

General information
- Location: National Highway 28B, Mangalpur, West Champaran district, Bihar; India
- Coordinates: 27°09′34″N 84°03′07″E
- Elevation: 94 m (308 ft)
- System: All trains stop here.
- Owner: Indian Railways
- Operator: East Central Railway
- Line: Muzaffarpur–Gorakhpur main line
- Platforms: 2
- Tracks: 2

Construction
- Structure type: Standard (on ground station)

Other information
- Status: Active
- Station code: AWS
- Zone(s): East Central Railway zone
- Division(s): Samastipur

History
- Opened: 1930s

Services
Preceding station	Indian Railways	Following station
Valmikinagar Road towards ?	East Central Railway zone Muzaffarpur–Gorakhpur main line	Bagaha towards ?
Location

Awasani railway station is a railway station on Muzaffarpur–Gorakhpur main line under the Samastipur railway division of East Central Railway zone. | station master = Devnath Shukla | station master = Devnath Shukla This is situated beside National Highway 28B at Mangalpur in West Champaran district of the Indian state of Bihar.
