= Parishia paucijuga =

Conservation status
- Near Threatened (IUCN 3.1)

Scientific classification
- Kingdom: Plantae
- Clade: Tracheophytes
- Clade: Angiosperms
- Clade: Eudicots
- Clade: Rosids
- Order: Sapindales
- Family: Anacardiaceae
- Genus: Parishia
- Species: P. paucijuga

Binomial name
- Parishia paucijuga Engl.

Species of flowering plant

Parishia paucijuga is a flowering plant in the family Anacardiaceae. It is native to Southeast Asia.

== Description ==
Parishia paucijuga grows as a tree up to 30 m (100 ft) tall, with a trunk diameter of up to 20 cm (8 in). The leathery leaves are oblong and measure up to 15 cm (6 in) long and to 7 cm (2.8 in) wide. The inflorescences, measuring up to 35 cm (14 in) long, feature white flowers. The ellipsoid fruits measure up to 6 cm (2.4 in) long.

== Taxonomy ==
Parishia paucijuga was described by German botanist Adolf Engler in 1883. The type specimen was collected in Malacca. The specific epithet paucijuga means 'few pairs', referring to the leaves.

== Distribution and habitat ==
Parishia paucijuga is native to Borneo, Peninsular Malaysia, Singapore and Sumatra. Its habitat is in lowland dipterocarp forests and in swamp forests.

== Conservation ==
Parishia paucijuga has been assessed as near threatened on the IUCN Red List. It is threatened by logging for its timber and by conversion of land for plantations. It is not currently known if the species is present in any protected areas.
