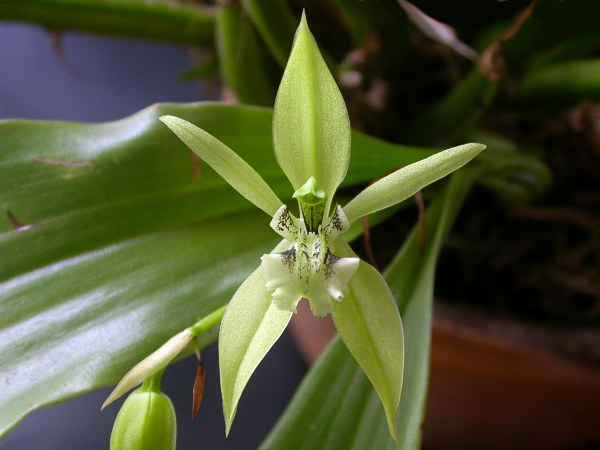

Scientific classification
- Kingdom: Plantae
- Clade: Tracheophytes
- Clade: Angiosperms
- Clade: Monocots
- Order: Asparagales
- Family: Orchidaceae
- Subfamily: Epidendroideae
- Tribe: Arethuseae
- Genus: Coelogyne
- Species: C. parishii

Binomial name
- Coelogyne parishii Hook.f. (1862)

Synonyms
- Pleione parishii (Hook.f.) Kuntze (1891)

= Coelogyne parishii =

Species of orchid

Coelogyne parishii is a species of orchid. It was named by Joseph Dalton Hooker in honour of the botanist and plant collector Charles Parish, in 1862.
