= Valmikinagar Road railway station =

Railway station in Bihar, India

Valmikinagar Road

General information
- Location: National Highway 28B, Bagha, Rampurwa, West Champaran district, Bihar; India
- Coordinates: 27°11′42″N 84°02′04″E
- Elevation: 96 m (315 ft)
- System: Passenger train station
- Owner: Indian Railways
- Operator: East Central Railway
- Line: Muzaffarpur–Gorakhpur main line
- Platforms: 2
- Tracks: 1

Construction
- Structure type: Standard (on ground station)

Other information
- Status: Active
- Station code: VKNR
- Zone(s): East Central Railway zone
- Division(s): Samastipur

History
- Opened: 1930s

Services
Preceding station	Indian Railways	Following station
Paniahwa towards ?	East Central Railway zone Muzaffarpur–Gorakhpur main line	Awasani towards ?
Location

Valmikinagar Road railway station (station code: VKNR), is a railway station on Muzaffarpur–Gorakhpur main line under the Samastipur railway division of East Central Railway zone. It is located beside National Highway 28B at Bagha, Rampurwa in the West Champaran district of Bihar.
