= Sasan Gir railway station =

Railway Station in Gujarat, India

Sasan Gir

General information
- Location: SH 111, Sasan Gir, Gujarat; India
- Coordinates: 21°10′07″N 70°36′09″E
- Elevation: 158 metres (518 ft)
- System: Indian Railways station
- Owner: Indian Railways
- Platforms: 1
- Tracks: 3 (Metre Gauge)
- Connections: Auto stand

Construction
- Structure type: Standard (on-ground station)
- Parking: No
- Cycle facilities: No

Other information
- Status: Functioning
- Station code: SASG
- Zone(s): Western Railway
- Division(s): Bhavnagar
Location
- Location within Gujarat

Sasan Gir railway station is a small railway station in Gir Somnath district, Gujarat. Its code is SASG. It serves Sasan Gir village. The station consists of one platform. The platform is not well sheltered. It lacks many facilities including water and sanitation.

== Major trains ==
- 52951/52952 Delvada–Junagadh MG Passenger (unreserved)
- 52929/52930 Dhasa–Veraval MG Passenger (unreserved)
- 52933/52946 Dhasa–Veraval MG Passenger (unreserved)
