= Mathikettan Shola National Park =

National park in South India

- IUCN category II (national park)
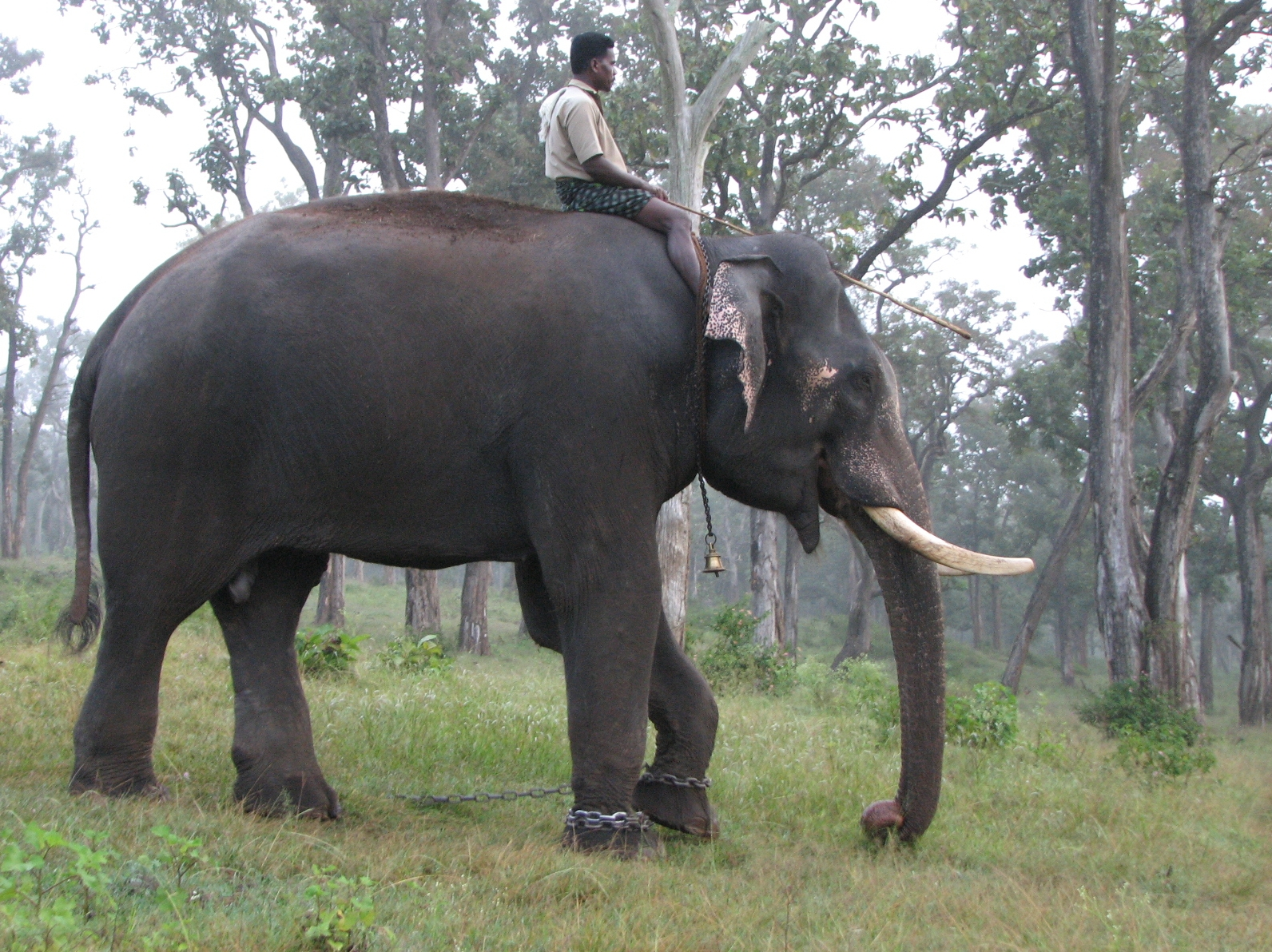

- Location within India
- Interactive map of Mathikettan Shola National Park
- Location: Pethotty, Idukki, Kerala, India
- Nearest city: Munnar
- Coordinates: 10°02′N 77°08′E
- Area: 12.82 km^{2} (4.95 sq mi)
- Established: 21 November 2003

Mathikettan Shola National Park is a 12.82 km^{2} national park in Santhanpara village of Udumbanchola taluk in Idukki district of India's Kerala state. It was notified as a national park on 21 November 2003. Considering the unique nature of the shola forest in Mathikettan and its importance as an elephant strip, the state government has declared it as a National park in 2008. Central government has notified its area varying from zero to one kilometre around the boundary as eco sensitive zone. The park is located between other reserve forests like Eravikulam National Park and Pampadam Shola National Park.

== Etymology ==
The name Mathikettan derives from the Tamil word literally meaning 'one who had his mind confused', as the local people say that one forgets the path once he enters into the park. It notified as a national park to protect the wildlife and rich biodiversity of the area. The Shola forest in the area is bestowed with unit with geological fauna and flora and geomorphological wealth.

== History ==
This tract was notified as a Reserve Forest by the Travancore Government in 1897. Part of the land, prior to becoming a national park, had been leased out for the production of Cardamom. It was declared a National Park on 21 November 2003 to protect its ecological, faunal, floral and geographical wealth and its environment.

== Fauna ==
Elephants which visit Mathikettan shola from the Munnar Division become trapped between the Bodinayakkanur and Kottamalai areas. This is due to private establishments on the northern side of Mathikettan, as well as degraded forests and human settlements on the southern side in areas of Chinnamanur Forest beat in Gudalur range.

== Visitor information ==
There are 2 viewing centres called Njandaar mettu and Uchilukuth mettu. One can see Tamilnadu from these mountains. Mathikettan Shola can be approached from Poopara via Munnar, on the Munnar - Kumily Highway. One can also reach Poopara on the Idukki route via Kothamangalam. The nearest airports are Madurai Airport and Cochin International Airport. Tiruvalla Railway Station is the nearest railway station. Lodging facilities are available at Poopara.
