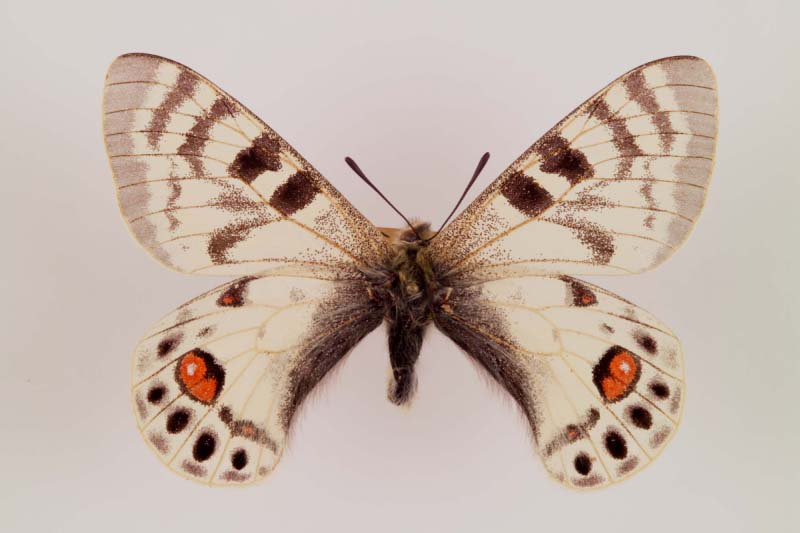
- Male collected by Grigory Grum-Grshimailo in the Alai mountains - Ulster Museum

Scientific classification
- Kingdom: Animalia
- Phylum: Arthropoda
- Class: Insecta
- Order: Lepidoptera
- Family: Papilionidae
- Genus: Parnassius
- Species: P. charltonius

Binomial name
- Parnassius charltonius Gray, 1853

= Parnassius charltonius =

Regal Apollo

Species of butterfly

Parnassius charltonius, the regal Apollo, is a high-altitude butterfly which is found in India. It is a member of the snow Apollo genus (Parnassius) of the swallowtail family (Papilionidae). This handsome butterfly is found at altitudes from 9,000 to 13,000 feet (2,700 to 4,000 m) from Chitral to Kumaon.

== Description ==
=== Male ===
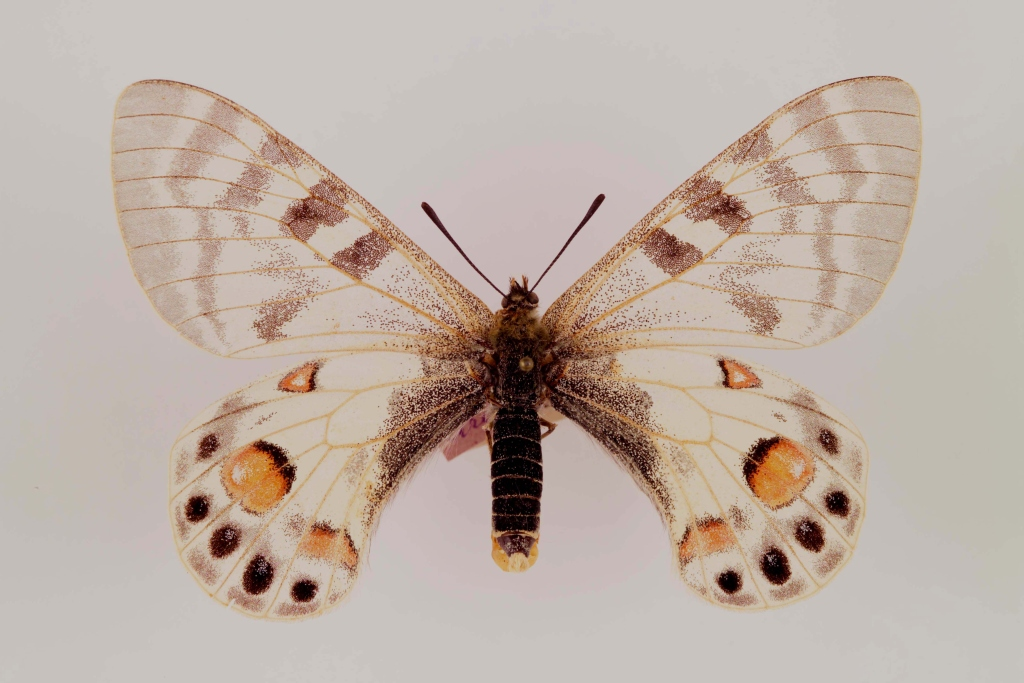
Female from the Aram-Kungei, Trans-Alai region

Upperside: creamy-white. Forewing irrorated (speckled) with black scales at base, along costal margin narrowly and below the upper half of cell at base of interspaces 2 and 3; cell with the usual medial and apical short broad transverse black bars; a short broad, similar, but obliquely placed bar beyond apex of cell from costa to vein 4, its lower portion below vein 5 narrower and bent inwards at an angle; a postdiscal transverse black bar attenuated towards the dorsum and dislocated inwards below vein 5; followed by a broad, posteriorly narrowed, subhyaline (almost glass-like) terminal edging; cilia white. Hindwing: base and dorsal margin, for four-fifths of its length, broadly and densely irrorated with black scales; a short oblique pretornal dusky-black bar, rarely centred with pink or carmine; a very large pink to deep crimson ocellus, ringed with black and centred with white, in interspaces 4 and 5, crossing vein 5, and a much smaller black spot sometimes centred minutely with pink or crimson in middle of interspace 7; beyond this a postdiscal curved series of five velvety-black spots, each touched inwardly with silvery, superposed on a broad subhyaline dusky transverse band, which is broadest in the middle and is followed by a subterminal, somewhat narrow, dusky-black band, interrupted at the veins; cilia white. Underside similar, with a glassy appearance and similar markings, seen chiefly, however, by transparency from the upperside. Antenna, head, thorax and abdomen black, antenna with some few minute white specks; beneath: head and thorax anteriorly with olivaceous pubescence, thorax posteriorly and abdomen covered with long white hairs, which also clothe the dorsal margin of the hindwing.

=== Female ===
Upper and undersides similar to those in the male; differs in the black markings which are broader, the red ocelli on the hindwing that are considerably larger, and in the obliquely placed pretornal short bar that is always centred with red.

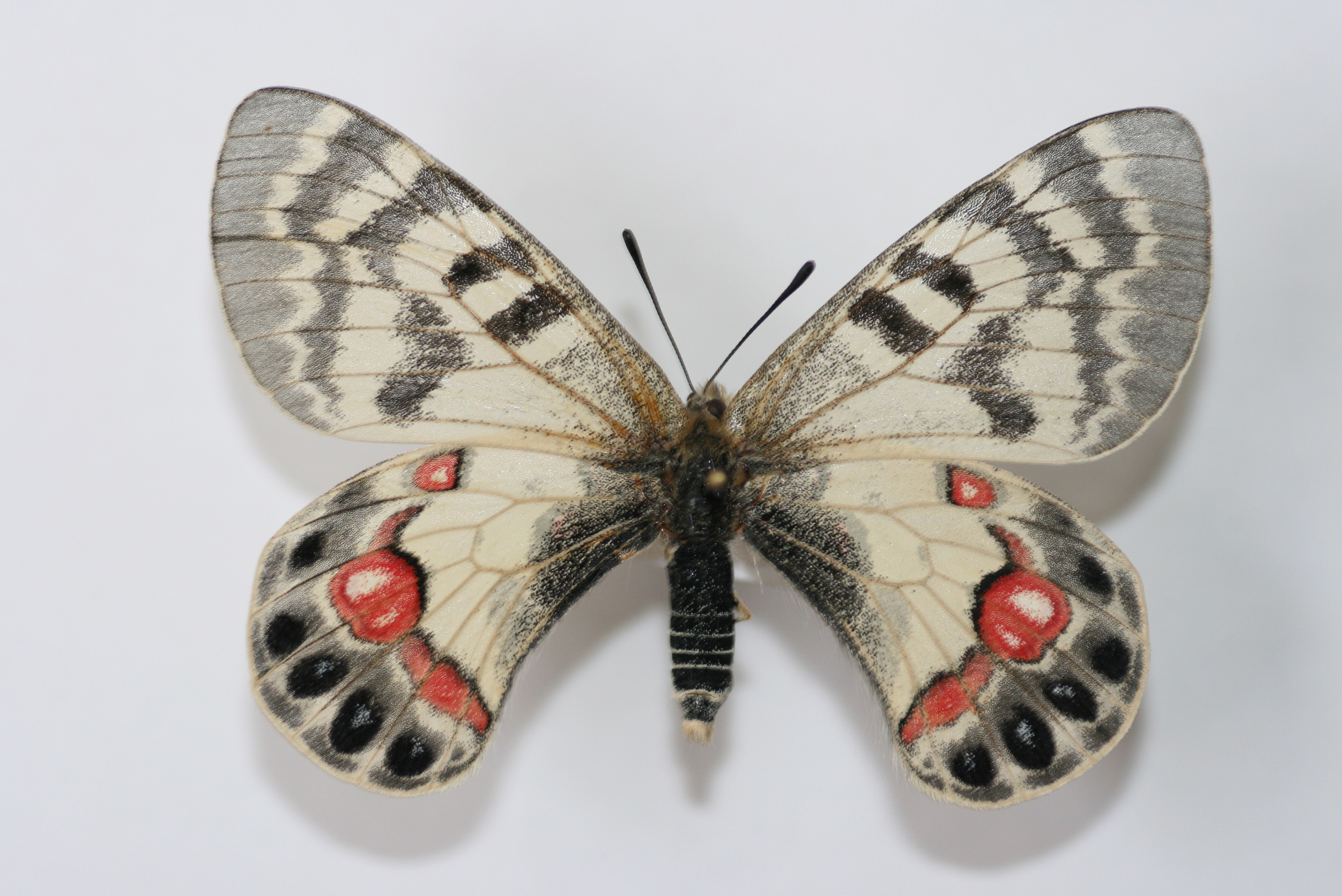
Photograph of a female specimen of forma aenigma

== Range ==
Afghanistan, Kyrgyzstan, eastern Uzbekistan, Tajikistan, northern Pakistan (Gilgit-Baltistan and parts of Azad Kashmir), northern India (Himachal Pradesh and Uttarakhand), Tibet and other parts of China.

== Status ==
Not known to be threatened as a species. The butterfly is considered to be common in Kashmir and is not rare in India. The nominate subspecies is protected by law in India.

== See also ==
- Papilionidae
- List of butterflies of India
- List of butterflies of India (Papilionidae)

== Other references ==
- Evans, W.H. (1932). The Identification of Indian Butterflies (2nd ed.). Mumbai, India: Bombay Natural History Society.
- Sakai S., Inaoka S., Toshiaki A., Yamaguchi S., Watanabe Y., (2002) The Parnassiology. The Parnassius Butterflies, A Study in Evolution, Kodansha, Japan. ISBN 4-06-124051-X
- Weiss Jean-Claude, (1999) Parnassiinae of the World, Hillside Books, Canterbury, UK. ISBN 0-9532240-2-3, OCLC 41072974
