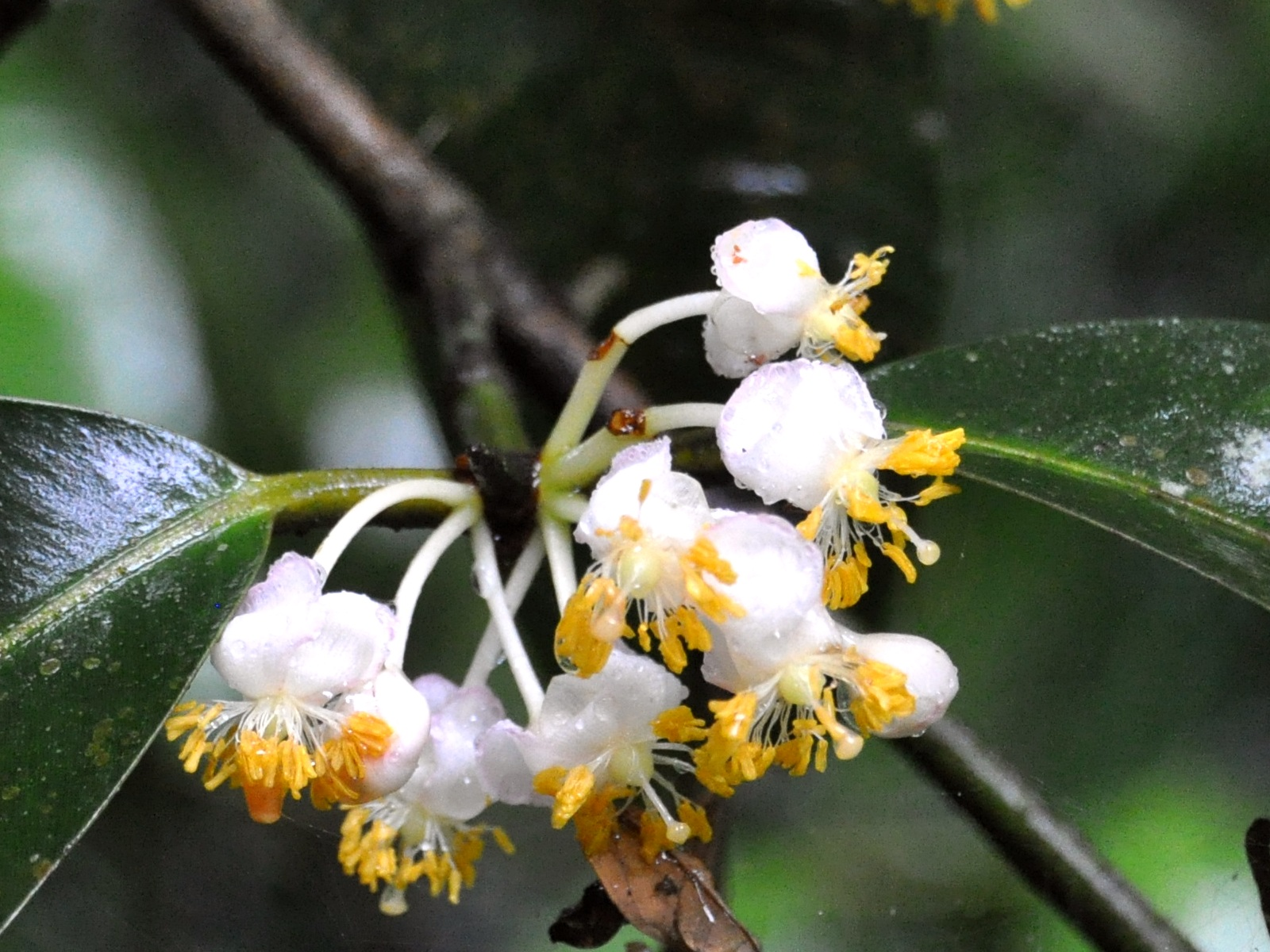

Conservation status
- Least Concern (IUCN 3.1)

Scientific classification
- Kingdom: Plantae
- Clade: Tracheophytes
- Clade: Angiosperms
- Clade: Eudicots
- Clade: Rosids
- Order: Malpighiales
- Family: Calophyllaceae
- Genus: Calophyllum
- Species: C. soulattri

Binomial name
- Calophyllum soulattri Burm.f.

Synonyms
- Synonymy: Apoterium sulatri Blume; Calophyllum cholobtaches Lauterb.; Calophyllum cymosum Miq.; Calophyllum diepenhorstii Miq.; Calophyllum hibbardii Elmer; Calophyllum hirtellum Miq.; Calophyllum kiong K.Schum. & Lauterb.; Calophyllum lanceolatum Warb.; Calophyllum lancifolium Elmer; Calophyllum odoratissimum Noronha; Calophyllum paludosum C.T.White; Calophyllum solomonense A.C.Sm.; Calophyllum sorsogonense Elmer ex Merr.; Calophyllum spectabile var. ceramicum Boerl.; Calophyllum spectabile var. diepenhorstii (Miq.) Boerl.; Calophyllum spectabile var. miquelii Boerl.; Calophyllum suriga Buch.-Ham. ex Roxb.; Calophyllum tetrapetalum Roxb.; Calophyllum versteegii Lauterb.; Calophyllum warburgii Engl.; Calophyllum zschokkei Elmer; Mammea suriga Kosterm.

= Calophyllum soulattri =

Species of flowering plant

Calophyllum soulattri is a species of flowering plant in the Calophyllaceae family. It is native to southern Indochina (the Andaman Islands, Cambodia, Myanmar, the Nicobar Islands, Thailand, and Vietnam), Malesia (Peninsular Malaysia, Singapore, Borneo, Sumatra, Java, the Lesser Sunda Islands, the Maluku Islands, and the Philippines), Papuasia (New Guinea, the Bismarck Archipelago, and the Solomon Islands), the Northern Territory of Australia, and Palau. It is considered one of the best bintangor timber species.

== Gallery ==
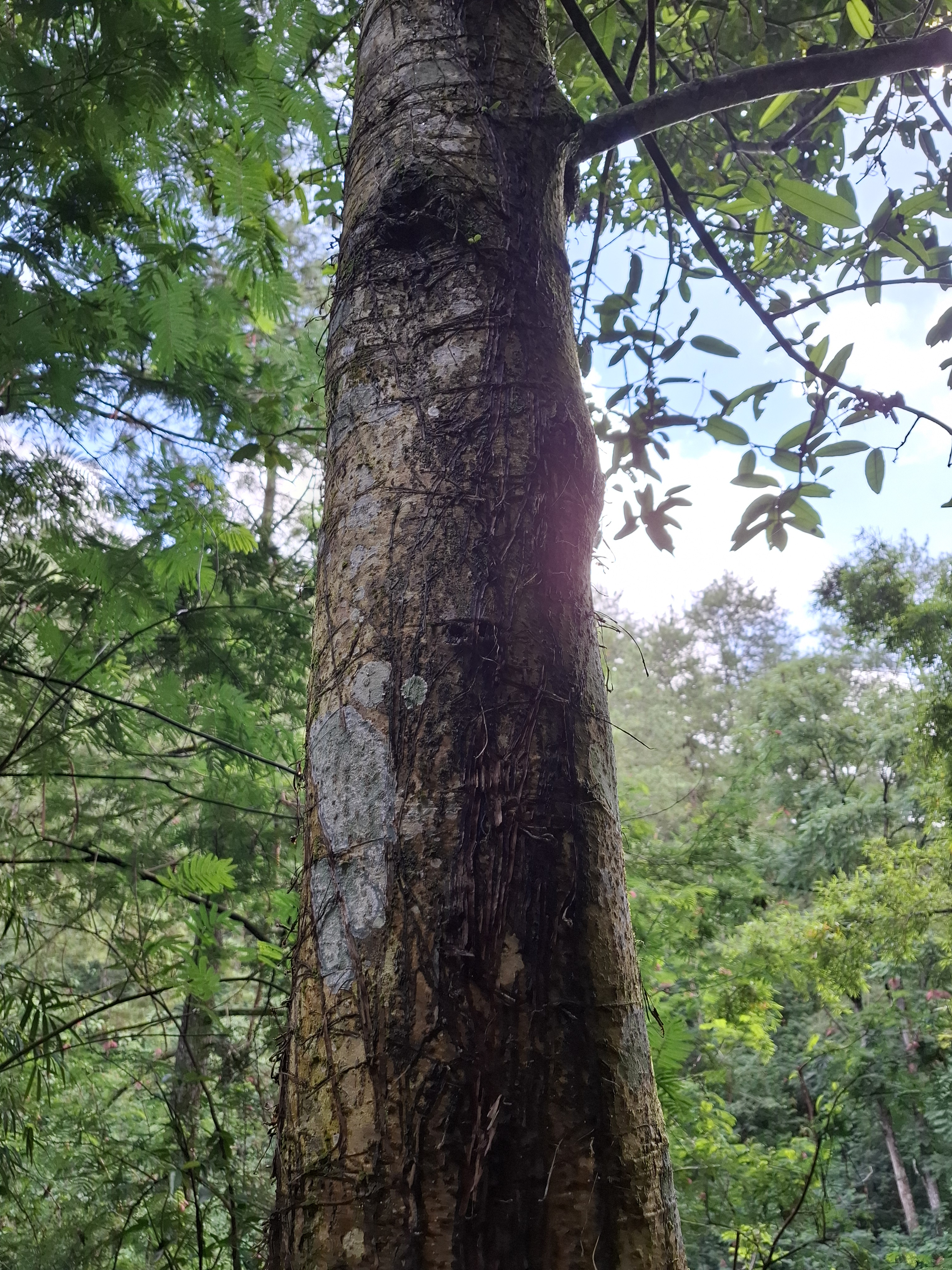
Stem

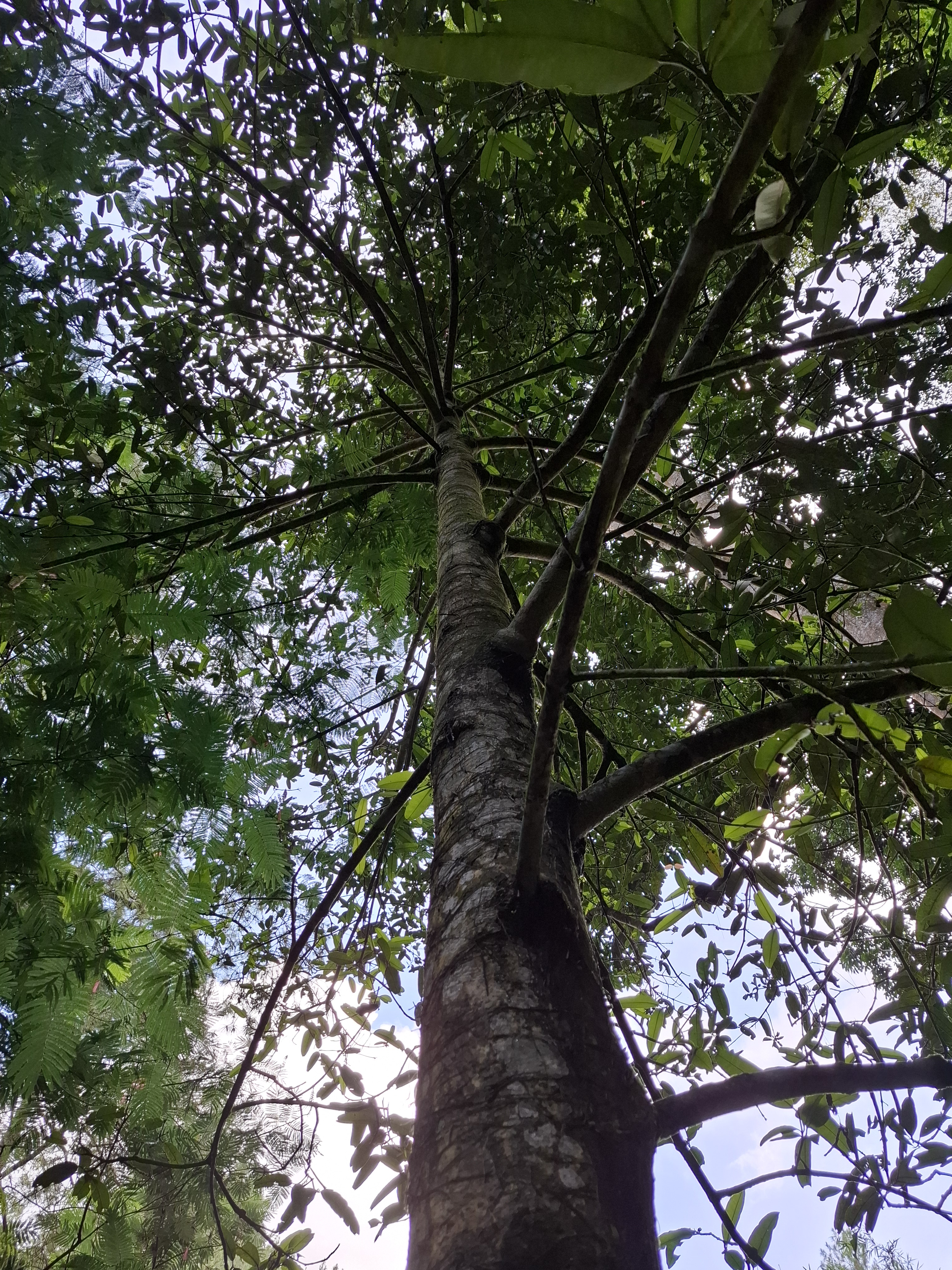
Tree

== See also ==
- Domesticated plants and animals of Austronesia
