= North Button Island National Park =

National park in the Andaman and Nicobar Islands

Coordinates: 12°19′02″N 93°04′05″E

North Button Island National Park is a national park in the Andaman and Nicobar Islands along the coast of India. The park is about 44 square miles (114 km^{2}) and home to many creatures such as the dugong and the dolphin.

North Button Island National Park was set up in 1979 and situated in the Andaman district. It is 16 km (10 mi) away from the nearest town of Long Island and the airport is Port Blair which is at a distance of 90 km (56 mi) from the Park. The best months for visiting the park are from December to March. The island's area is 19.5 ha (48 acres), and it belongs to the Button islands. Most of the park is covered with deciduous forest. The park is one of the warm and humid tropical zones.

== Flora and fauna ==
The fauna found here constitute of dugong, dolphin, water monitor, lizard etc.
