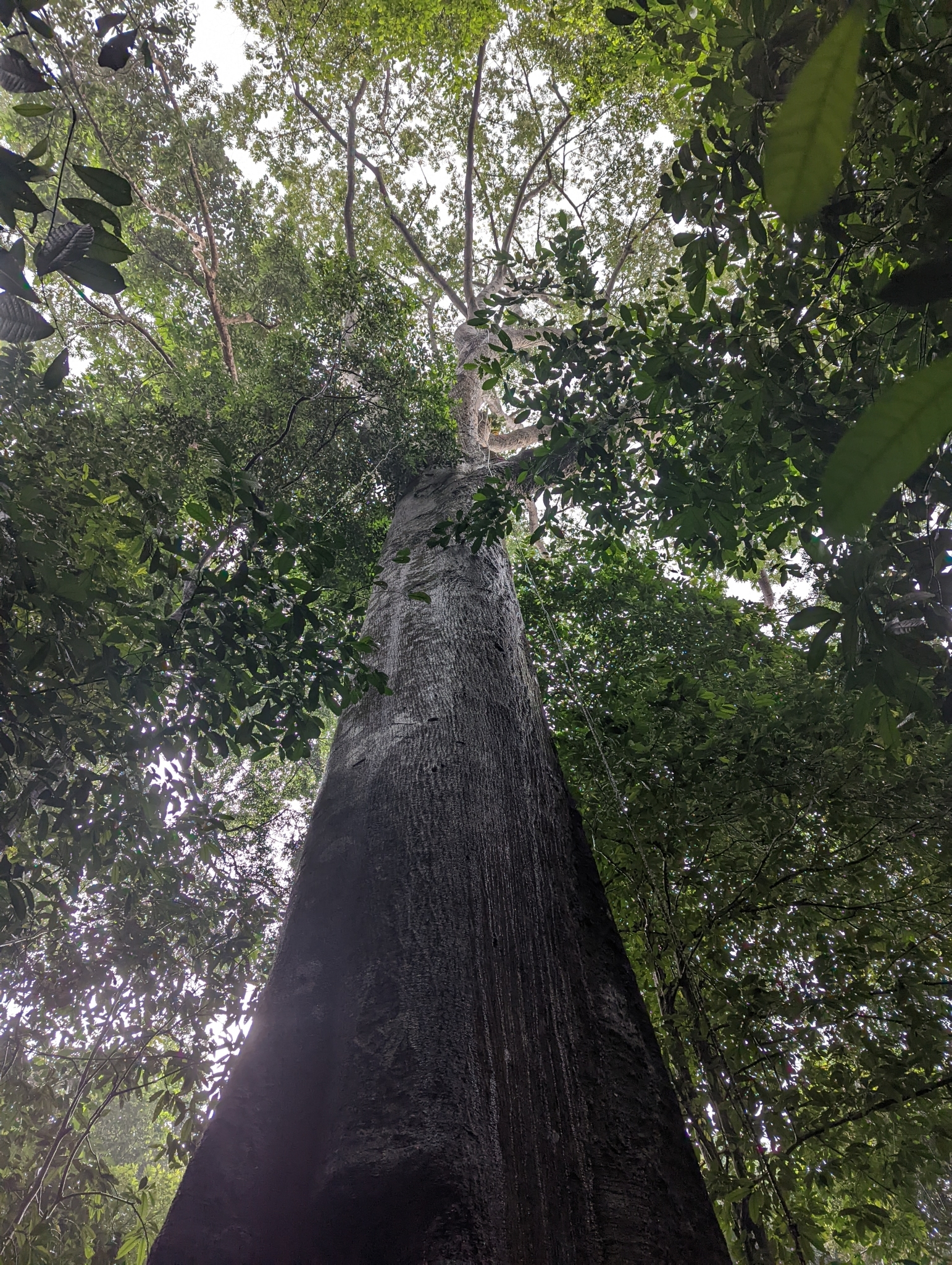
- In Singapore

Conservation status
- Least Concern (IUCN 3.1)

Scientific classification
- Kingdom: Plantae
- Clade: Embryophytes
- Clade: Tracheophytes
- Clade: Angiosperms
- Clade: Eudicots
- Clade: Rosids
- Order: Sapindales
- Family: Anacardiaceae
- Genus: Parishia
- Species: P. insignis

Binomial name
- Parishia insignis Hook.f.

Synonyms
- Astronium insigne Marchand; Parishia borneensis Ridl.; Parishia lowei Ridl.; Parishia pubescens Hook.f.; Parishia rosea Ridl.

= Parishia insignis =

Species of flowering plant

Parishia insignis is a flowering plant in the family Anacardiaceae. It is native to Southeast Asia.

== Description ==
Parishia insignis grows as a tree up to 40 m (130 ft) tall, with a trunk diameter of up to 60 cm (24 in). It has buttress roots. The brown bark is cracked. The leathery leaves are lanceolate, ovate or oblong and measure up to 15 cm (6 in) long and to 6.5 cm (2.6 in) wide. The velvety fruits are ovoid and measure up to 2 cm (0.8 in) long. The timber is used in construction.

== Taxonomy ==
Parishia insignis was described by British botanist Joseph Dalton Hooker in 1860. The type specimen was collected in Burma (Myanmar). The specific epithet insignis means 'remarkable'.

== Distribution and habitat ==
Parishia insignis is native to Borneo, Peninsular Malaysia, Singapore, Myanmar, Sumatra, Thailand and the Andaman Islands. Its habitat is in lowland forests, including those dominated by dipterocarps.

== Conservation ==
Parishia insignis has been assessed as least concern on the IUCN Red List. It is threatened by conversion of land for plantations and by logging for its timber. It is not known to be present in any protected area. It is considered vulnerable in Singapore.
