= Rani Jhansi Marine National Park =

National park in India

Coordinates: 11°47′N 92°40′E

- IUCN category II (national park)
- Location within India
- Interactive map of Rani Jhansi Marine National Park
- Location: Andaman and Nicobar Islands
- Area: 256 km^{2} (99 sq mi)
- Established: 1996

Rani Jhansi Marine National Park is located in the Andaman and Nicobar Islands in the Bay of Bengal. It was founded in 1996, and covers 256 km^{2}. It commemorates Lakshmibai, the Rani of Jhansi (1828-58). It is located in the Ritchie's Archipelago and is about 30 km from Port Blair. It contains coral reefs and mangrove forests. The biggest attraction in the park is a fruit-eating bat. It plays a major role in the ecosystem, because it pollinates plants and scatters seeds.
