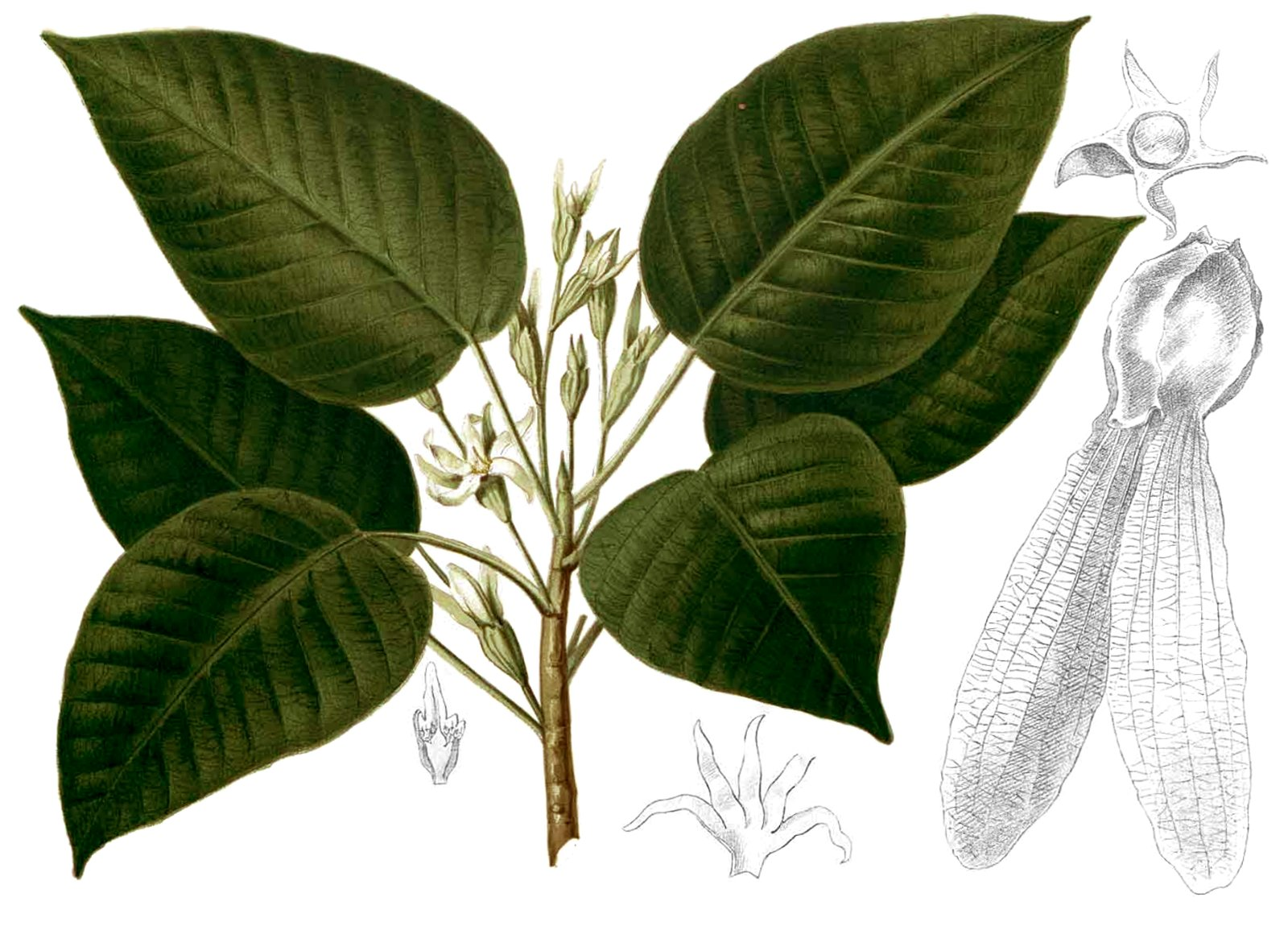

Conservation status
- Endangered (IUCN 3.1)

Scientific classification
- Kingdom: Plantae
- Clade: Embryophytes
- Clade: Tracheophytes
- Clade: Angiosperms
- Clade: Eudicots
- Clade: Rosids
- Order: Malvales
- Family: Dipterocarpaceae
- Genus: Dipterocarpus
- Species: D. grandiflorus

Binomial name
- Dipterocarpus grandiflorus (Blanco) Blanco

Synonyms
- Dipterocarpus blancoi Blume; Dipterocarpus griffithii Miq. Dipterocarpus motleyanus Hook.f. Dipterocarpus pterygocalyx Scheff. Dipterocarpus grandiflora Blanco; Vatica trigyna Griff.

= Dipterocarpus grandiflorus =

Species of flowering plant

Dipterocarpus grandiflorus is a species of flowering plant in the Dipterocarpaceae family. It is an endangered medium hardwood tree of Southeast Asia. It is a large tree which can grow up to 50 metres (160 ft) tall.

== Range and habitat ==
Dipterocarpus grandiflorus ranges from Bangladesh and the Andaman Islands through Myanmar, Thailand, Laos, Vietnam, Peninsular Malaysia, Sumatra, Borneo, and the Philippines.

It grows in lowland evergreen forests, most commonly in primary forests on drier sites and forested ridges, from sea level up to 700 metres elevation. It often grows close to the sea. In the Andaman Islands it is a predominant upper-canopy forest species together with Dipterocarpus kerrii and Dipterocarpus gracilis. In the Philippines it is found in lauan (mixed dipterocarp) and broadleaved forests.

The species' habitat is currently in decline in quality and extent across its native range.

== Uses ==
Its wood is used to produce good quality charcoal, paper pulp, and timber sold under the Keruing designation. Its gum is used locally as a waterproofing varnish. The tree itself is very useful for nitrogen fixing, erosion control, soil improvement, and watershed regulation.
