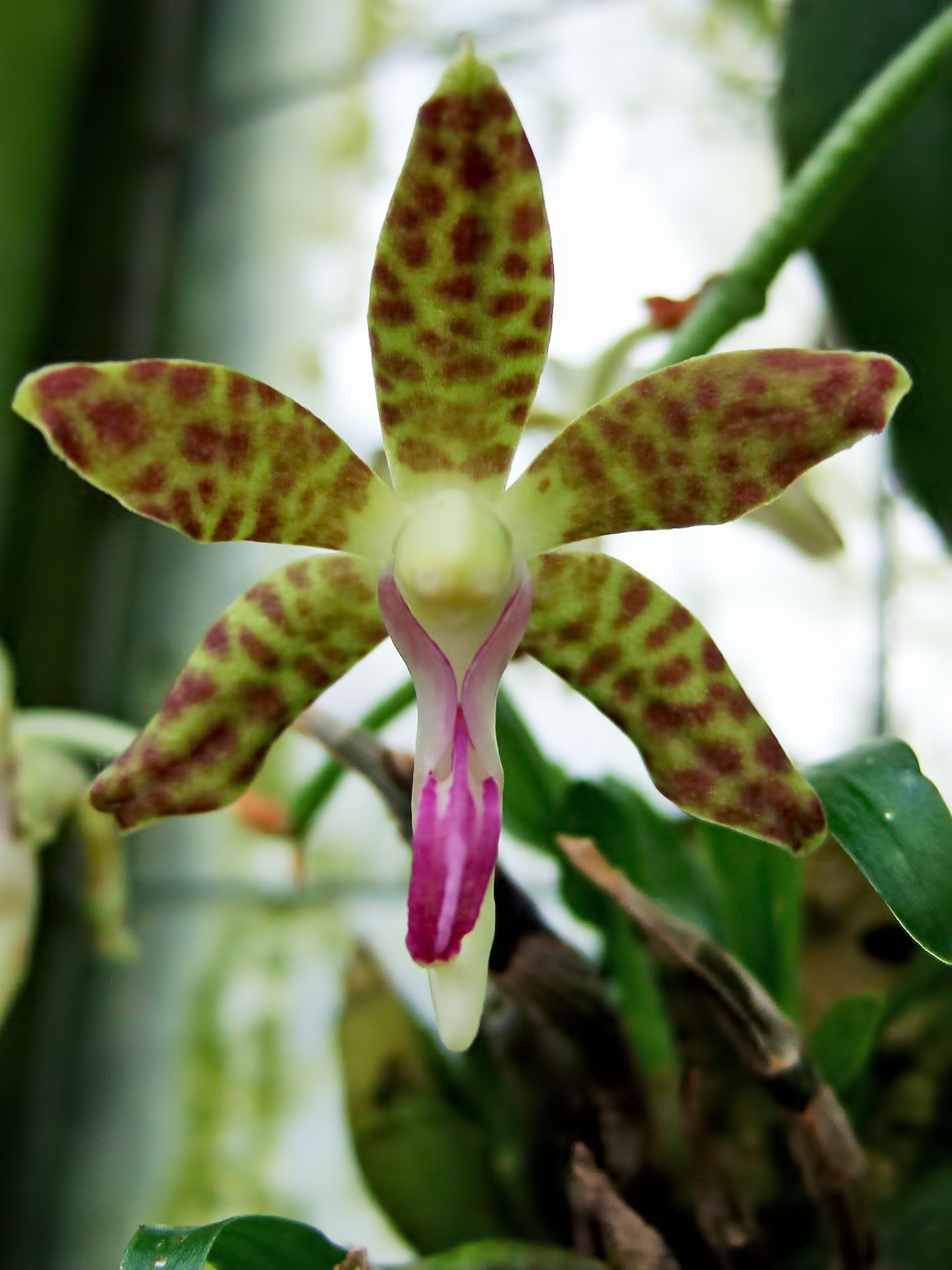
- Detail of Phalaenopsis subparishii flower

Scientific classification
- Kingdom: Plantae
- Clade: Tracheophytes
- Clade: Angiosperms
- Clade: Monocots
- Order: Asparagales
- Family: Orchidaceae
- Subfamily: Epidendroideae
- Genus: Phalaenopsis
- Subgenus: Phalaenopsis subg. Hygrochilus
- Species: P. subparishii

Binomial name
- Phalaenopsis subparishii (Z.H.Tsi) Kocyan & Schuit.
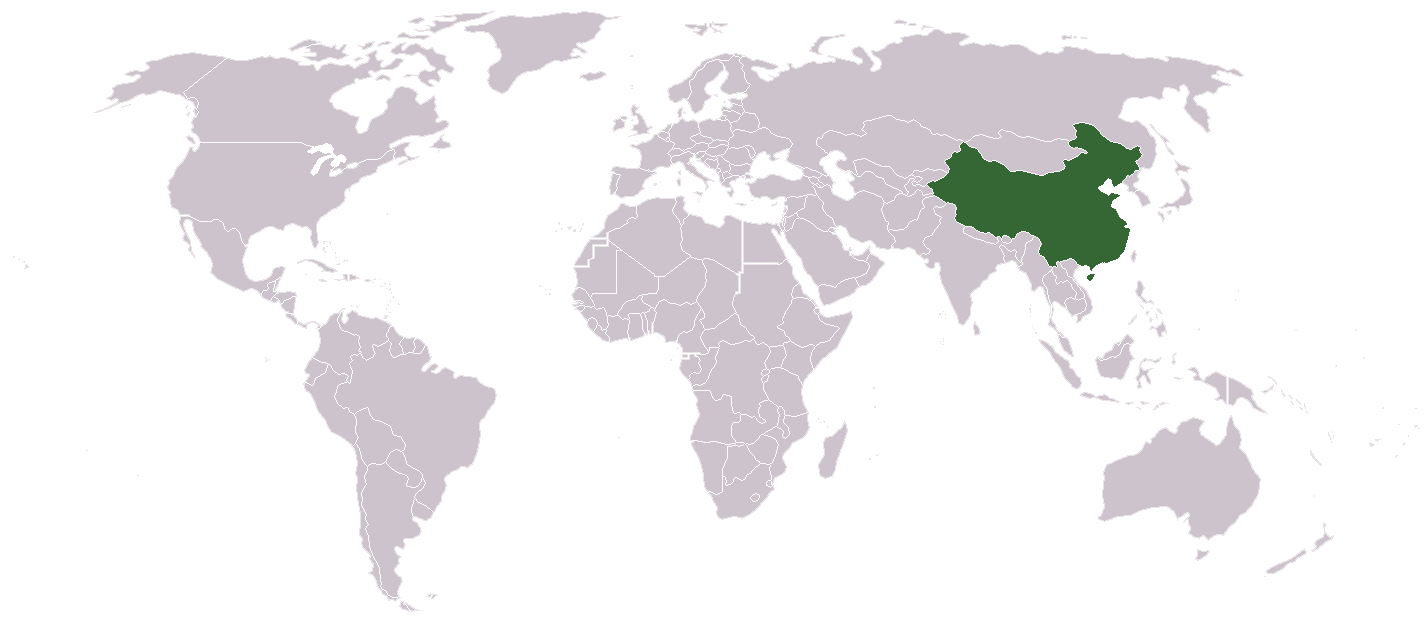
- Distribution of Phalaenopsis subparishii

Synonyms
- Hygrochilus subparishii Z.H.Tsi; Sedirea subparishii (Z.H.Tsi) Christenson

= Phalaenopsis subparishii =

Species of epiphytic orchid

Phalaenopsis subparishii, also known as 短茎萼脊兰 (duan jing e ji lan) in Chinese, is a species of epiphytic orchid endemic to China.

== Distribution ==
It occurs in the Chinese provinces Fujian, Guangdong, Guizhou, Hubei, Hunan, Sichuan, and Zhejiang at altitudes of 300–1100 m.

== Description ==
The 1 to 1.5 cm long stems bear 1–10 cm long and 2.4-3.3 cm wide, alternate leaves. Inflorescences are between 9 and 10 cm in length and bear flowers with yellowish green, spotted petals and sepals. The spotting is pale brown on the adaxial surface. The midlobe bears lavender spotting. The horn-shaped spur ranges from 0.9 to 1.1 cm in length. The plants have four pollinia in two pairs. The species is closely related to Phalaenopsis tsii, which is however smaller than Phalaenopsis subparishii and it has a larger, white labellum in addition to a longer spur and column.

== Etymology ==
The specific epithet subparishii expresses an affinity to Phalaenopsis hygrochila (syn. Hygrochilus parishii). It does not express an affinity to Phalaenopsis parishii.

== Phylogeny ==
This species is the sister species of Phalaenopsis hygrochila, as can be seen in the following cladogram:

- - subgen. Hygrochilus
    - - - - Phalaenopsis hygrochila
          - Phalaenopsis subparishii
        - Phalaenopsis tsii
      - Phalaenopsis japonica
    - Phalaenopsis marriottiana
  - subgen. Ornithochilus
    - Phalaenopsis yingjiangensis
    - Phalaenopsis difformis

== Conservation ==
The IUCN has not assessed this species conservation status. It is however protected unter the CITES appendix II regulations of international trade. Also, it is protected under national legislation.
