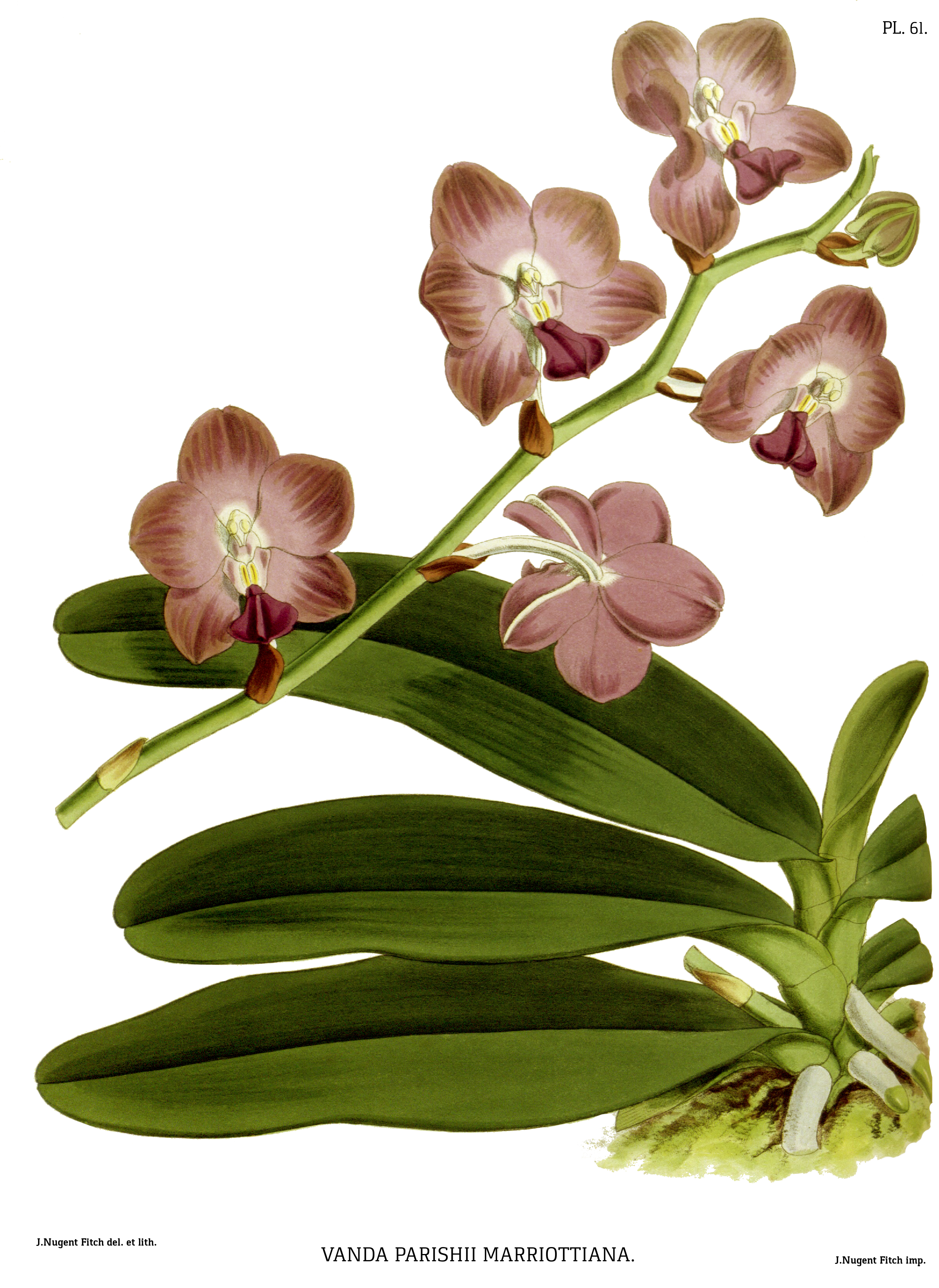
- botanical illustration of Phalaenopsis marriottiana

Scientific classification
- Kingdom: Plantae
- Clade: Tracheophytes
- Clade: Angiosperms
- Clade: Monocots
- Order: Asparagales
- Family: Orchidaceae
- Subfamily: Epidendroideae
- Genus: Phalaenopsis
- Subgenus: Phalaenopsis subg. Hygrochilus
- Species: P. marriottiana

Binomial name
- Phalaenopsis marriottiana (Rchb.f.) Kocyan & Schuit.
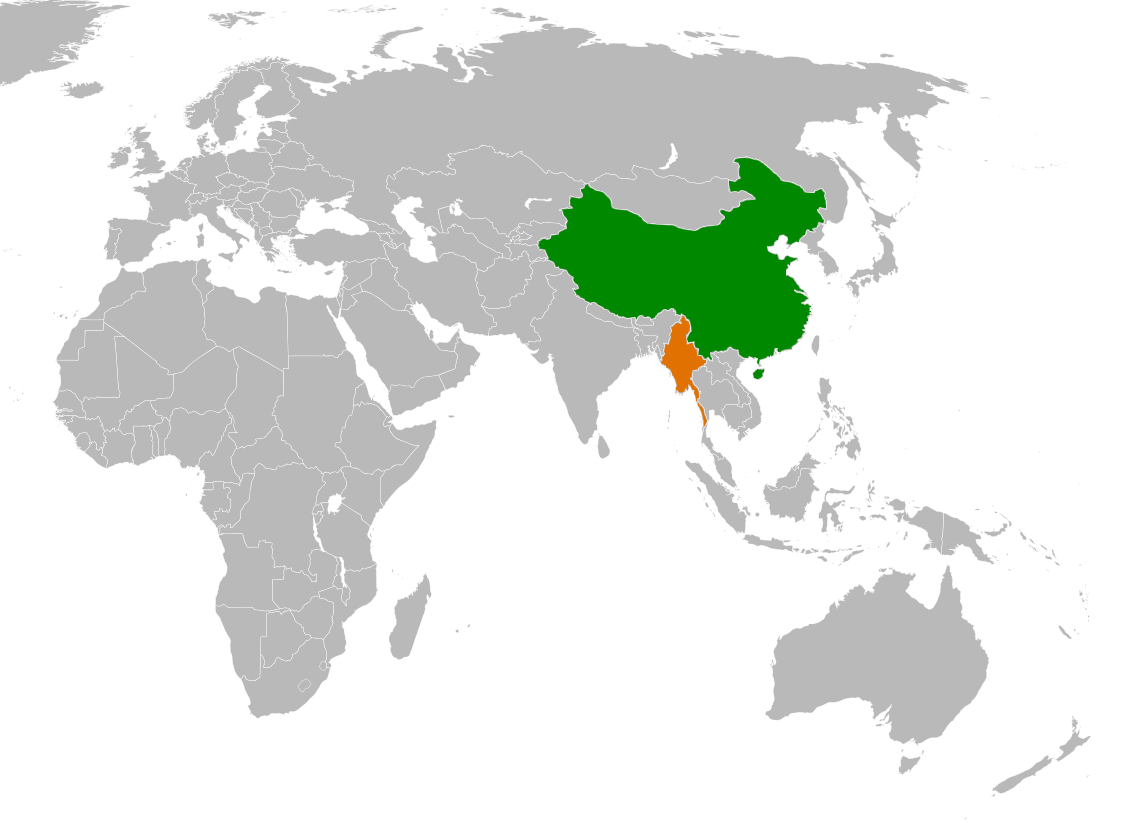
- distribution of Phalaenopsis marriottiana

Synonyms
- Hygrochilus marriottianus (Rchb.f.) Christenson; Hygrochilus parishii var. marriottianus (Rchb.f.) Pradhan; Hygrochilus parishii var. purpureus (N.E.Br.) Pradhan; Phalaenopsis pingxiangensis Hua Deng, Z.J.Liu & Yan Wang; Stauropsis marriottiana (Rchb.f.) Rolfe; Vanda parishii var. marriottiana Rchb.f.

= Phalaenopsis marriottiana =

Species of epiphytic orchid

Phalaenopsis marriottiana is a species of orchid native to Southeast China and Myanmar. The specific epithet marriottiana honours William Henry Smith-Marriott (1835–1924), who had a considerable orchid collection at Down House, Blandford, Dorsetshire in England.

== Description ==
These small, cool-growing epiphytes have fleshy, distichously arranged leaves. Flowering occurs in Winter and Spring from axillary racemes, which bear 2–6 fragrant flowers.

== Ecology ==
This species is found on limestone cliffs in deciduous, montane forests and foothills at elevations around 1300 meters above sea level.

== Taxonomy ==
=== Taxonomic history ===
This species was assigned to several different genera throughout its taxonomic history and was formerly believed to be a variant of Phalaenopsis hygrochila. It was later proven by genetic evidence, that the variations parishii and marriottiana of the former broadly defined Phalaenopsis hygrochila (syn. Hygrochilus parishii) are two separate species.

=== Differentiation from Phalaenopsis hygrochila ===
The petals and sepals of Phalaenopsis marriottiana are brownish to purple and lack darker spotting. The flowers may also be pink with yellow sepals and a purple-red, flabellate labellum, which was characteristic for Phalaenopsis pingxiangensis, which was reduced to synonymy with Phalaenopsis marriottiana due to genetic evidence.
On the other hand Phalaenopsis hygrochila has yellow sepals and petals, which are heavily spotted with deep red-brown.

== Phylogeny ==
This species is the sister species of the remainder of Phalaenopsis subgen. Hygrochilus, as can be seen in the following cladogram:

- - subgen. Hygrochilus
    - - - - Phalaenopsis hygrochila
          - Phalaenopsis subparishii
        - Phalaenopsis tsii
      - Phalaenopsis japonica
    - Phalaenopsis marriottiana
  - subgen. Ornithochilus
    - Phalaenopsis yingjiangensis
    - Phalaenopsis difformis

== Conservation ==
International trade is regulated through the CITES appendix II regulations of international trade.
