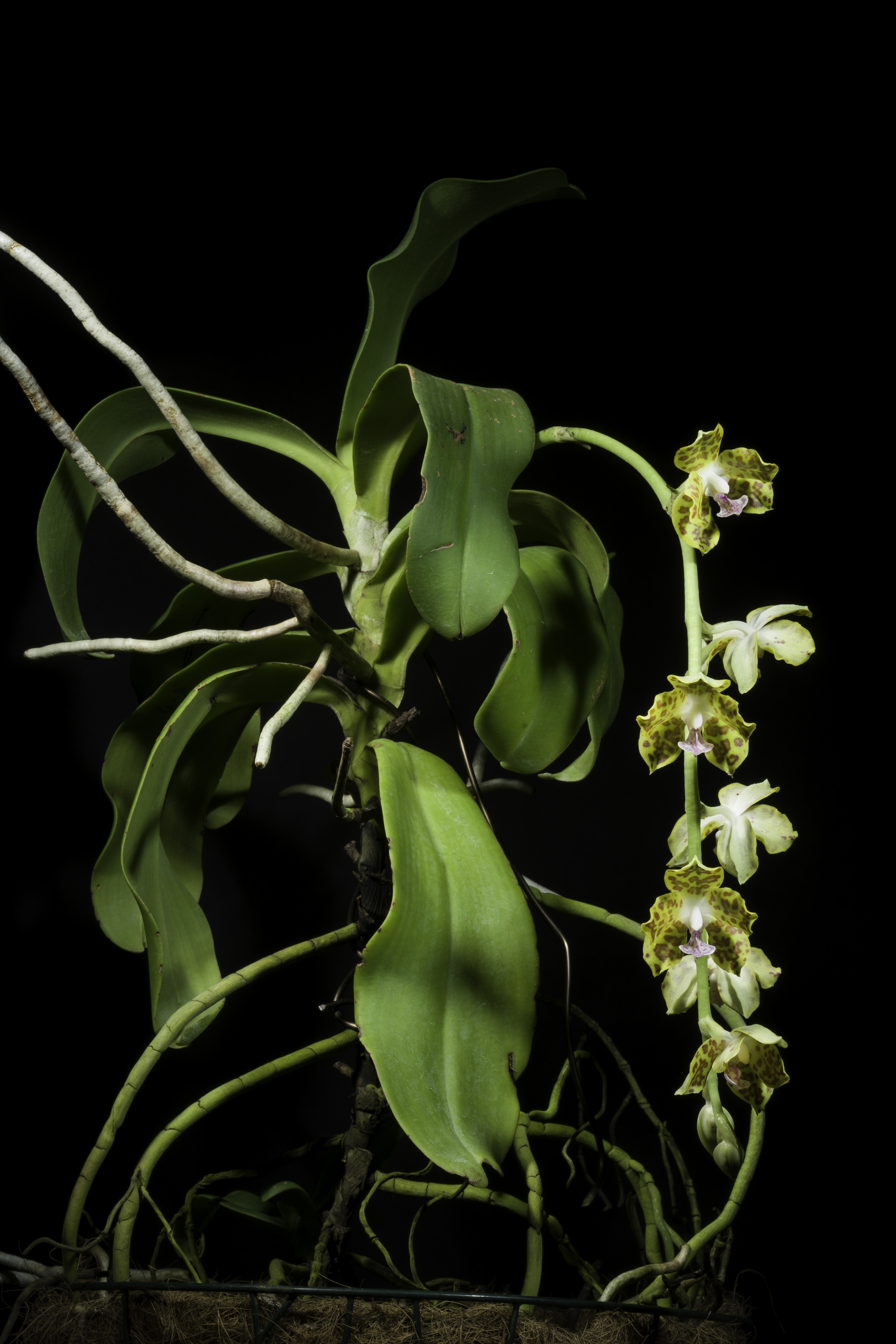
- Phalaenopsis hygrochila in flower

Scientific classification
- Kingdom: Plantae
- Clade: Tracheophytes
- Clade: Angiosperms
- Clade: Monocots
- Order: Asparagales
- Family: Orchidaceae
- Subfamily: Epidendroideae
- Genus: Phalaenopsis
- Subgenus: Phalaenopsis subg. Hygrochilus (Pfitzer) Kocyan & Schuit.

Species
- See here

= Phalaenopsis subg. Hygrochilus =

Subgenus of flowering plants

Phalaenopsis subg. Hygrochilus is a subgenus of the genus Phalaenopsis.

== Description ==
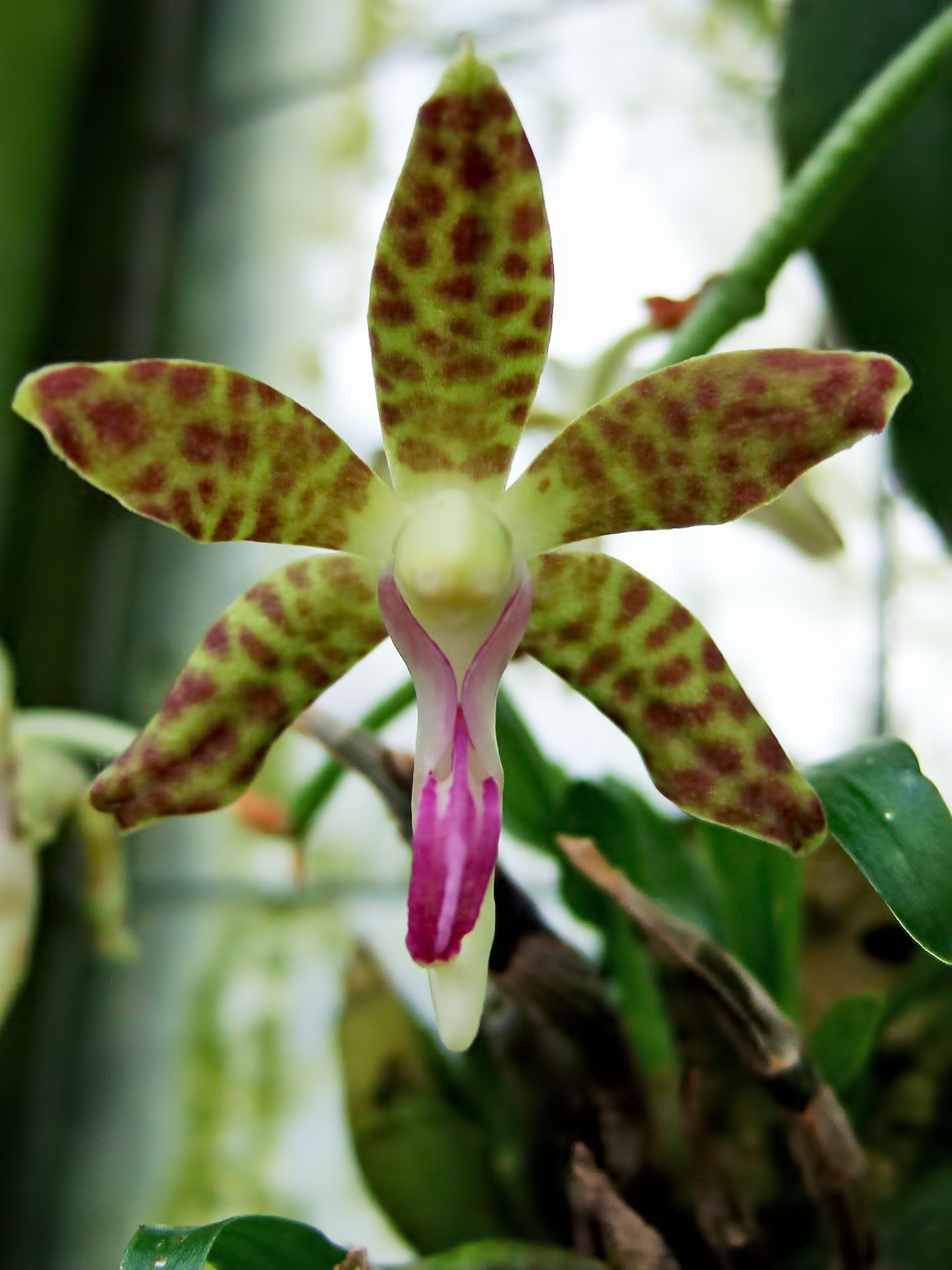
Phalaenopsis subparishii flower

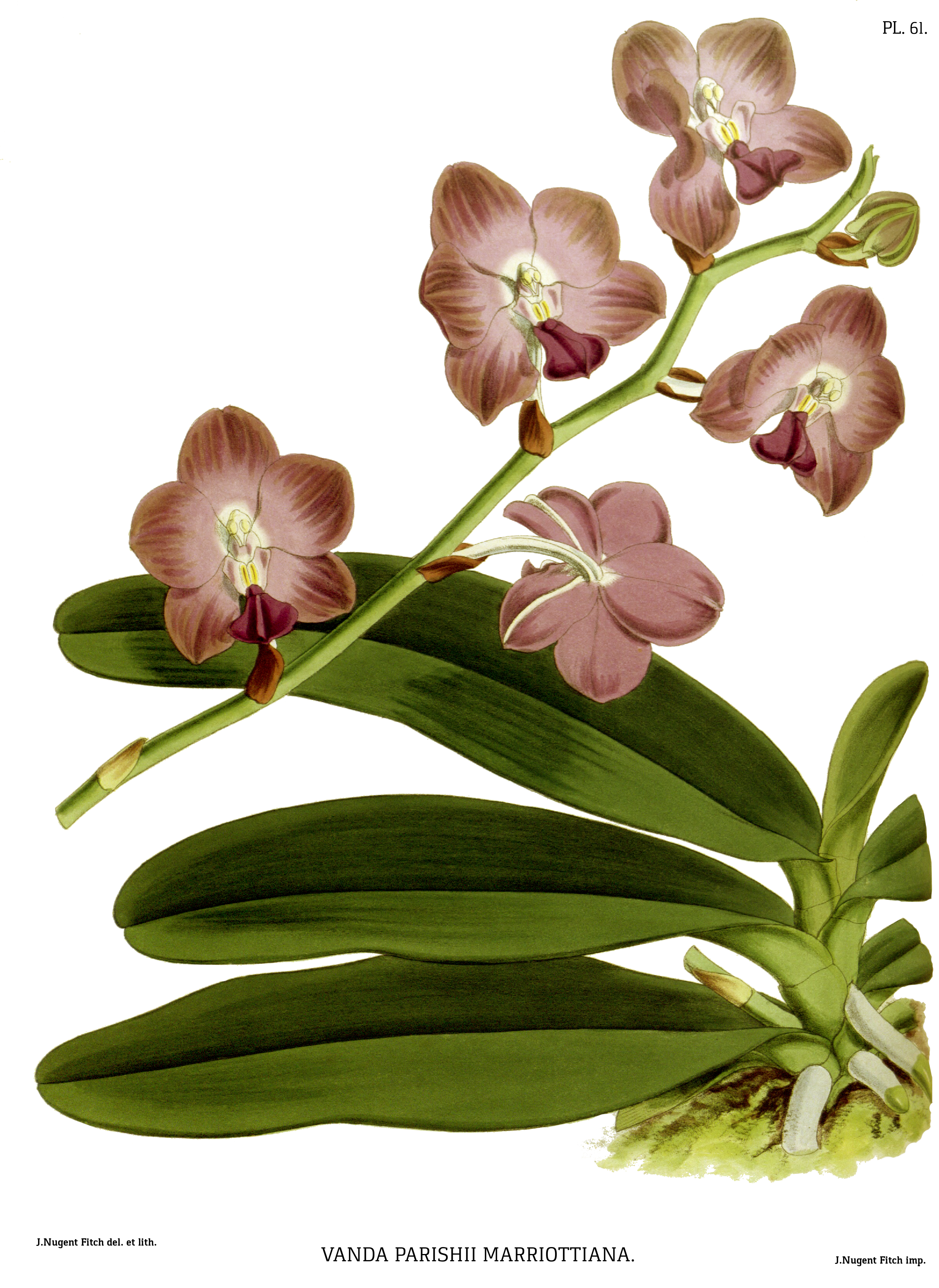
Illustration of Phalaenopsis marriottiana

=== Vegetative characteristics ===
The species are epiphytic, monopodial herbs.

=== Generative characteristics ===
The labellum is spurred. The flowers have four pollinia.

== Taxonomy ==
=== Publication ===
It was first published as Hygrochilus Pfitzer by Ernst Hugo Heinrich Pfitzer in 1897 with Hygrochilus parishii (Rchb. f.) Pfitzer. as the type species. It was later integrated into the genus Phalaenopsis Blume on the subgeneric level as Phalaenopsis subg. Hygrochilus (Pfitzer) Kocyan & Schuit. published by Alexander Kocyan and André Schuiteman in 2014.

=== Species ===
It consists of the following species:

- Phalaenopsis hygrochila J.M.H.Shaw
- Phalaenopsis japonica (Rchb.f.) Kocyan & Schuit.
- Phalaenopsis marriottiana (Rchb.f.) Kocyan & Schuit.
- Phalaenopsis subparishii (Z.H.Tsi) Kocyan & Schuit.
- Phalaenopsis tsii (M.H.Li, Z.J.Liu & S.R.Lan) Hua Deng, Z.J.Liu & Yan Wang
