= Phalaenopsis tsii =

Scientific classification
- Kingdom: Plantae
- Clade: Tracheophytes
- Clade: Angiosperms
- Clade: Monocots
- Order: Asparagales
- Family: Orchidaceae
- Subfamily: Epidendroideae
- Genus: Phalaenopsis
- Subgenus: Phalaenopsis subg. Hygrochilus
- Species: P. tsii

Binomial name
- Phalaenopsis tsii (M.H.Li, Z.J.Liu & S.R.Lan) Hua Deng, Z.J.Liu & Yan Wang
- distribution of Phalaenopsis tsii

Synonyms
- Hygrochilus tsii M.H.Li, Z.J.Liu & S.R.Lan

Species of epiphytic orchid

Phalaenopsis tsii is a species of orchid native to Southeast China. The specific epithet tsii honours Zhan-huo Tsi, who discovered Phalaenopsis subparishii. It has only been known from Mount Shunhuang in Hunan, China.

== Description ==
The stems are 0.7-1.2 cm long and bear distichously arranges leaves of 7–10 cm in length and 2.4-3.3 cm in width. The inflorescences are 6–9.5 cm long and they produce flowers with greenish base colouration and brown spotting on the adaxial surface of the petals and sepals. The flowers are spurred, like all other members of the subgenus Hygrochilus. The spur is horn-shaped and 1.3-1.5 cm long. The androecium consists of four pollinia, which are arranged in two equal pairs. This is a characteristic shared by the very similar Phalaenopsis subparishii, from which it differs due to the smaller size, the larger white labellum in addition to the longer spur and column of Phalaenopsis tsii.

== Ecology ==
This species if found growing epipytically on tree trunks in forests at elevations of 1200–1850 m.

== Conservation ==
This species is protected unter the CITES appendix II regulations of international trade.
