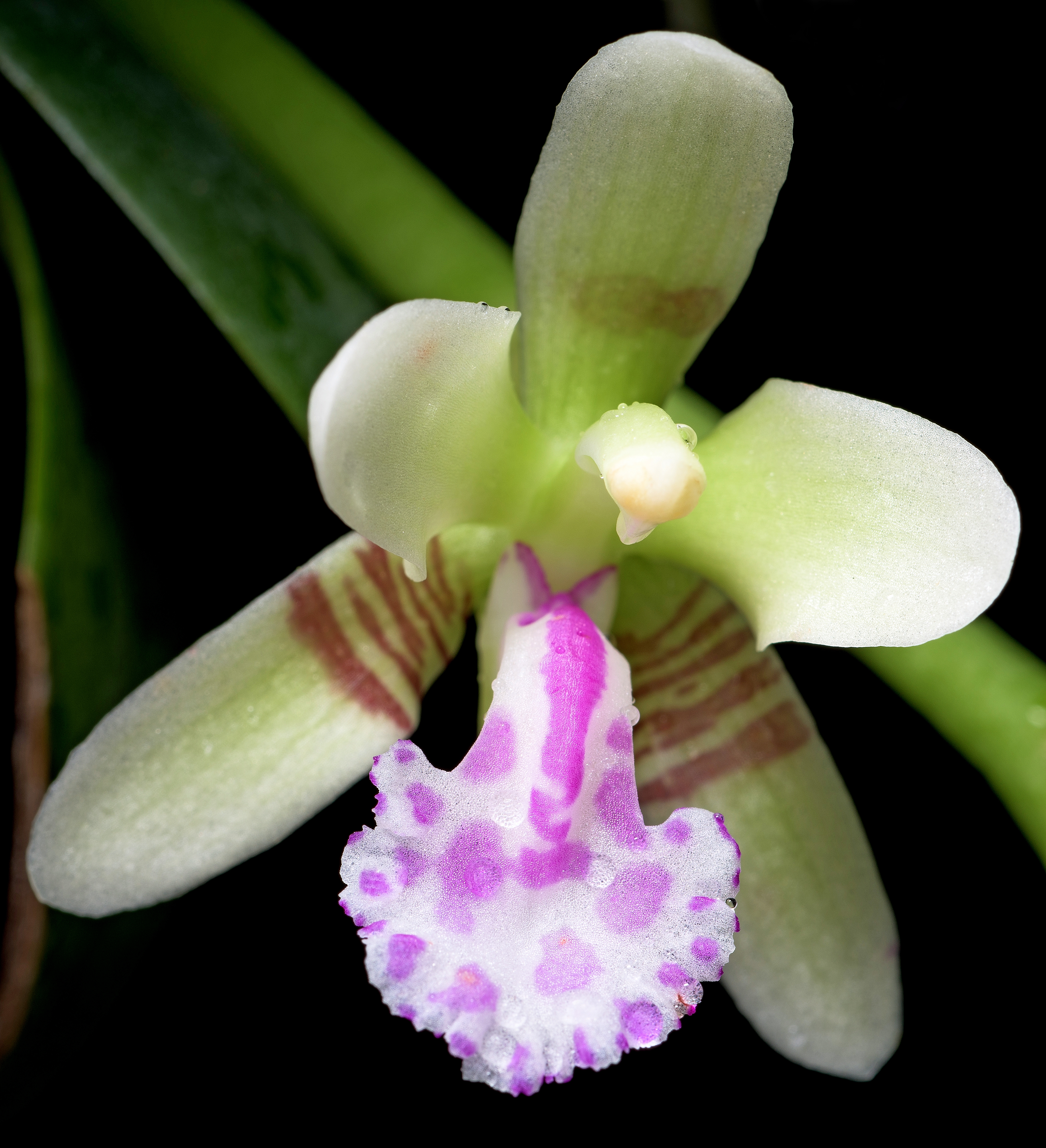
- Flower detail

Scientific classification
- Kingdom: Plantae
- Clade: Tracheophytes
- Clade: Angiosperms
- Clade: Monocots
- Order: Asparagales
- Family: Orchidaceae
- Subfamily: Epidendroideae
- Genus: Phalaenopsis
- Subgenus: Phalaenopsis subg. Hygrochilus
- Species: P. japonica

Binomial name
- Phalaenopsis japonica (Rchb.f.) Kocyan & Schuit.
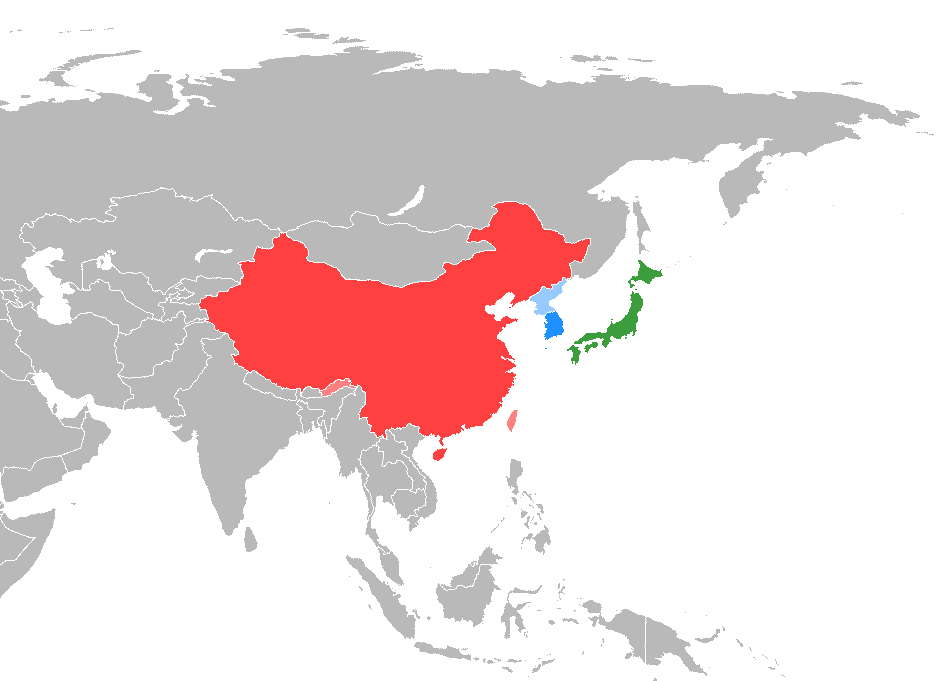
- distribution of Phalaenopsis japonica

Synonyms
- Aerides japonica Rchb.f.; Hygrochilus japonicus (Rchb.f.) M.H.Li, Z.J.Liu & S.R.Lan; Sedirea japonica (Rchb.f.) Garay & H.R.Sweet

= Phalaenopsis japonica =

Species of epiphytic orchid

Phalaenopsis japonica, also known as 萼脊兰 (e ji lan) in Chinese, 나도풍란 (nadopungnan) in Korean and ナゴラン or 名護蘭 (nago-ran) in Japanese, is a species of epiphyte in the family Orchidaceae, native to open forests of China, Japan and Korea, occurring at altitudes of 600–1400 m. It also may grow lithophytically on cliffs along valleys. The 1 to 1.5 cm long stems bear 6–13 cm long and 2–3 cm wide, alternate leaves. Inflorescences are between 17 and 19 cm in length and bear flowers with whitish green, petals and sepals. The lateral sepals bear 1-3 transverse bands of dull brown spots on the adaxial surface. The midlobe is spotted purple to red. The horn-shaped spur ranges from 1.2 to 1.4 cm in length. The plants have four pollinia in two pairs, but previously they have been mistaken as two pollinia.

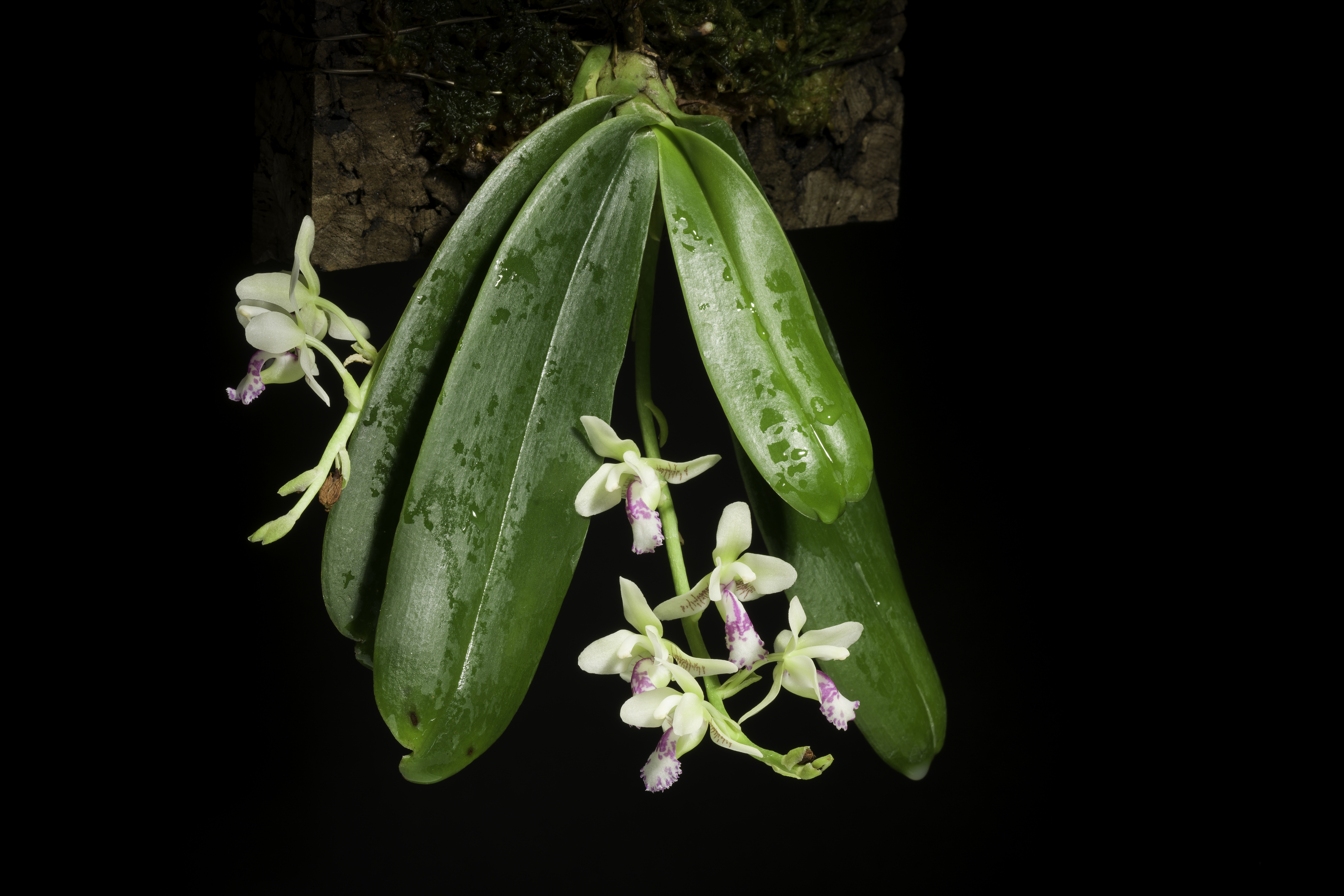

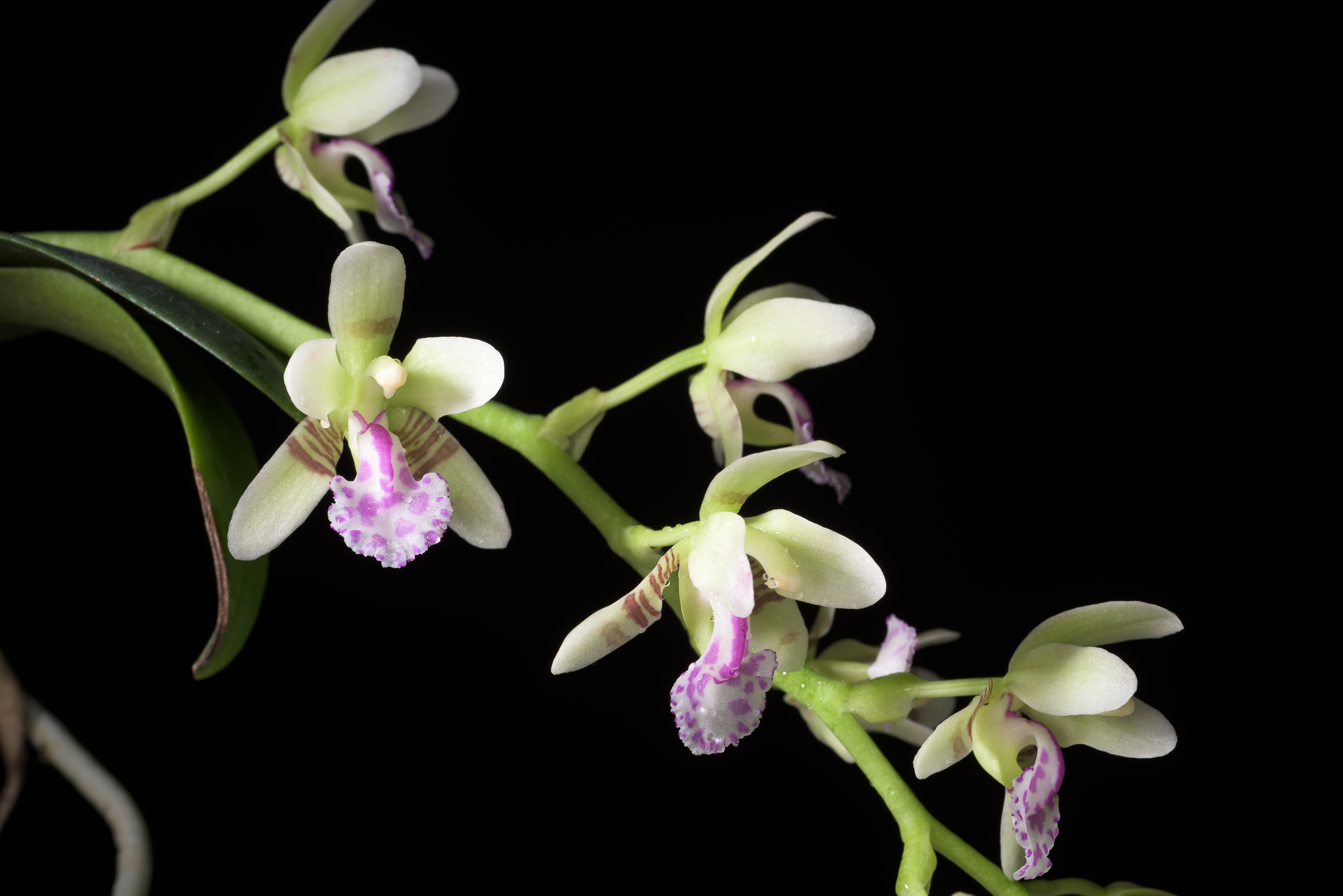

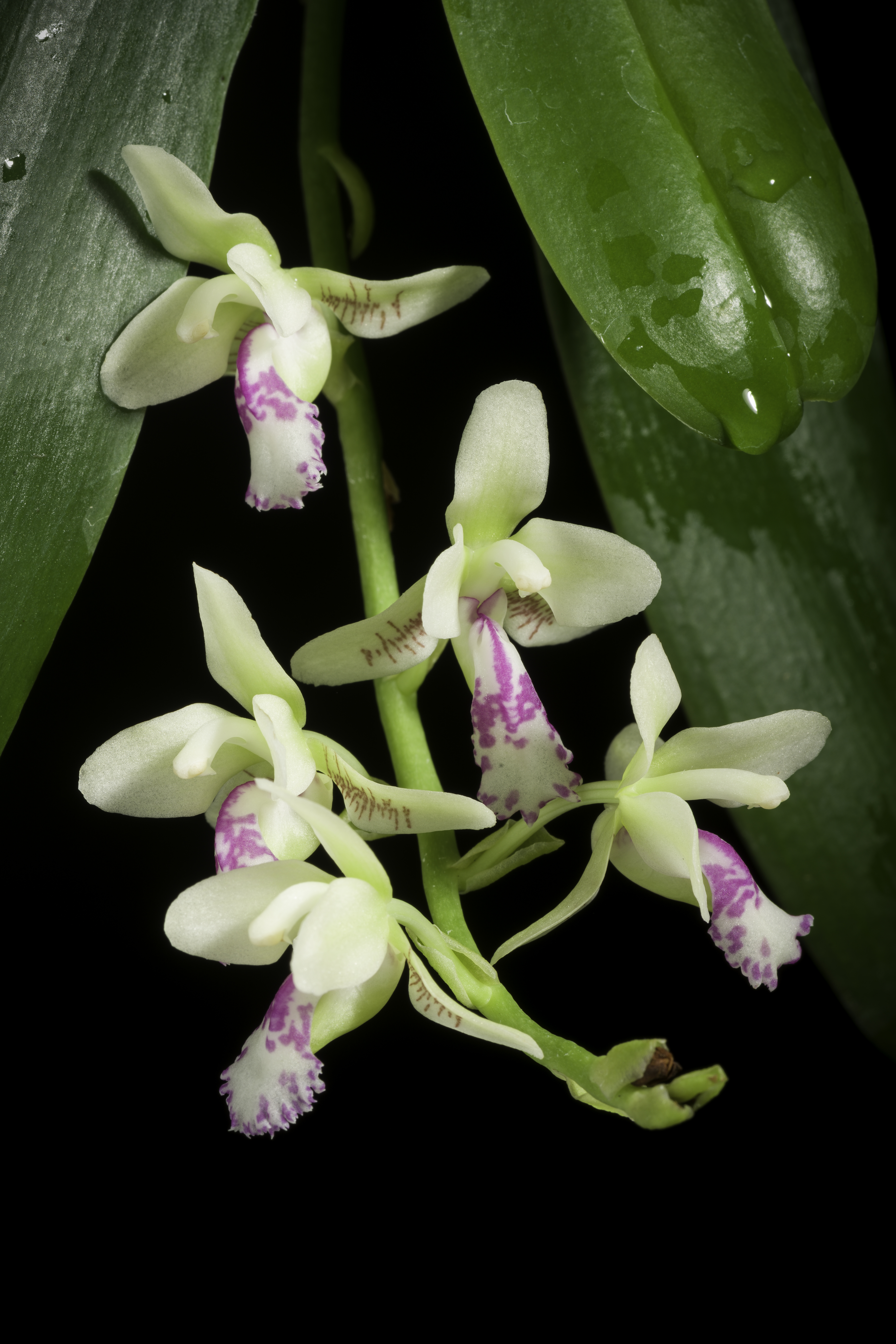

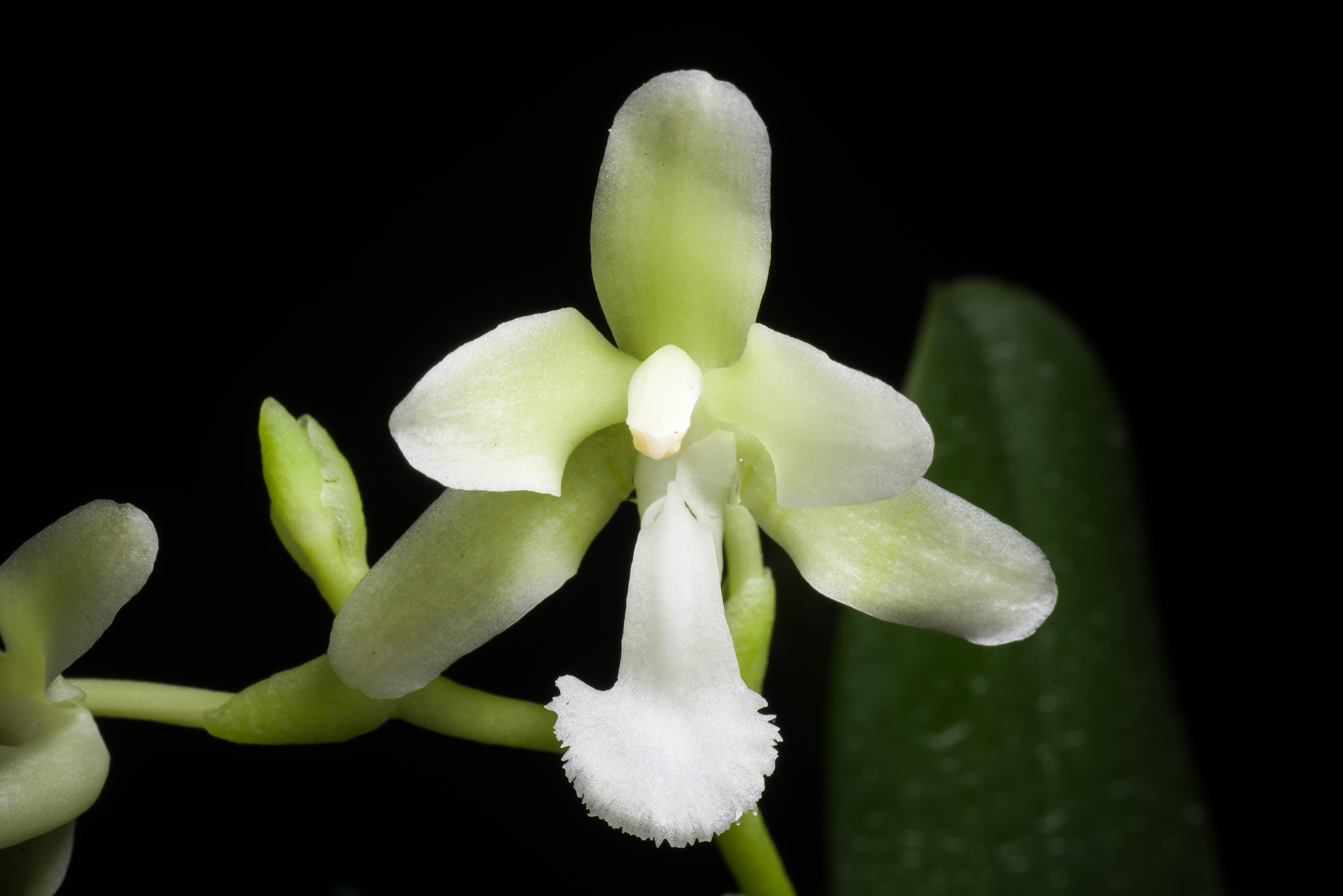

== Conservation ==
The IUCN has not assessed this species conservation status. It is however protected under the CITES appendix II regulations of international trade.
