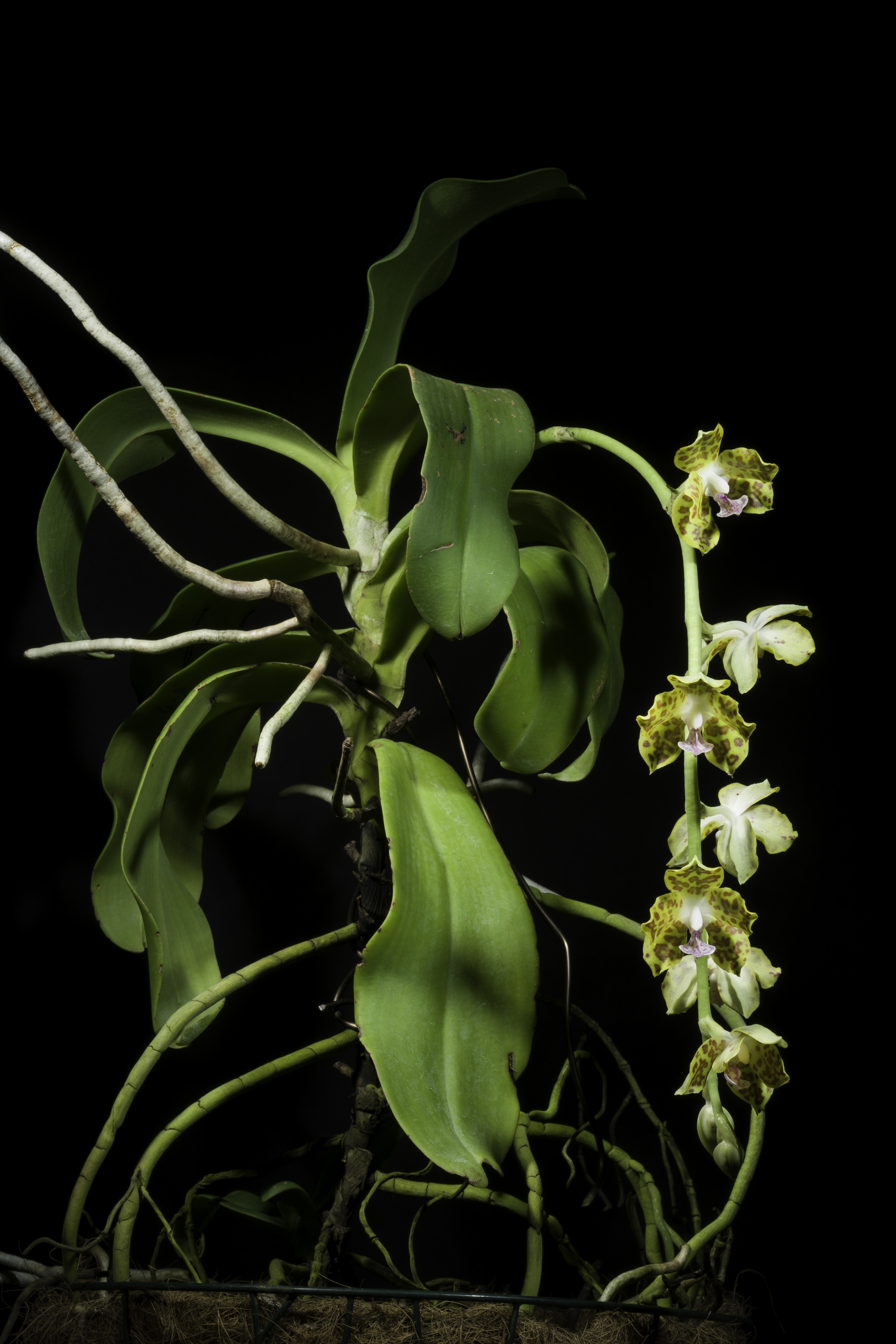
- Flowering Phalaenopsis hygrochila specimen in cultivation
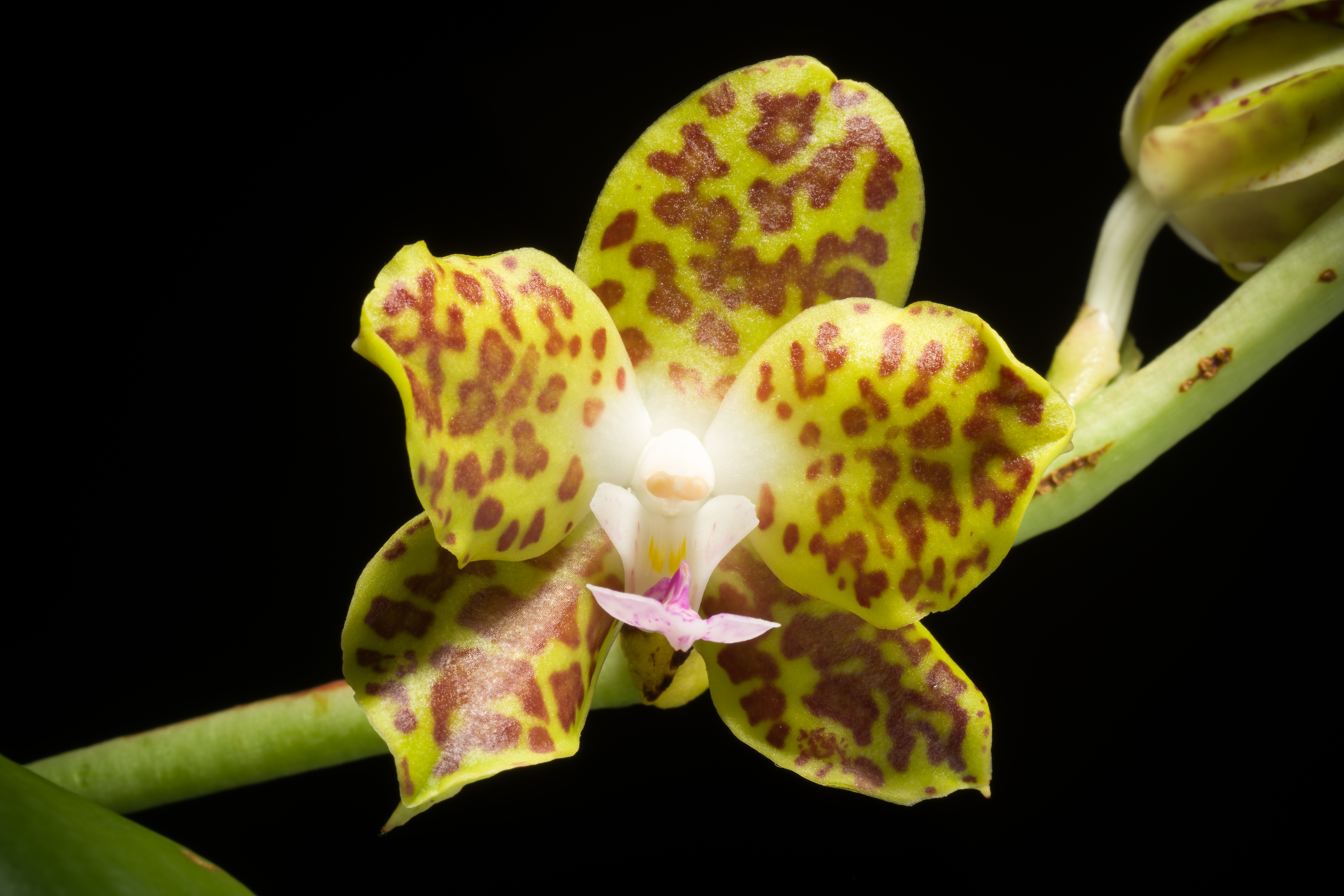
- Flower detail

Scientific classification
- Kingdom: Plantae
- Clade: Tracheophytes
- Clade: Angiosperms
- Clade: Monocots
- Order: Asparagales
- Family: Orchidaceae
- Subfamily: Epidendroideae
- Genus: Phalaenopsis
- Subgenus: Phalaenopsis subg. Hygrochilus
- Species: P. hygrochila

Binomial name
- Phalaenopsis hygrochila J.M.H.Shaw

Synonyms
- Hygrochilus parishii (Rchb.f.) Pfitzer; Phalaenopsis marriottiana var. parishii (Rchb.f.) Kocyan & Schuit.; Phalaenopsis tigrina M.He Li, O.Gruss & Z.J.Liu; Stauropsis parishii (Rchb.f.) Rolfe; Vanda parishii Rchb.f.; Vandopsis parishii (Rchb.f.) Schltr.

= Phalaenopsis hygrochila =

Species of epiphytic orchid

Phalaenopsis hygrochila, also known as 湿唇兰 (shi chun lan) in Chinese, is a species of epiphytic orchid native to Assam, China South-Central, China Southeast, East Himalaya, Laos, Myanmar, Thailand, and Vietnam.

== Taxonomy ==
This species has a complex taxonomic history and has been previously assigned to several genera.

== Description ==
The 5–10 cm, sometimes up to 20 cm long stems are 8–15 mm wide and enclosed within persistent leaf sheaths. They bear oblong to obovate-oblong, unequally bilobed, coriaceous leaves, between 17 and 29 cm in length and 3.5-5.5 cm in width. Yellow flowers of 4–5 cm in diameter with purple spotting and a white lip with lavender colouration on the midlobe are produced on 5-8 flowered, axillary and often pendent inflorescences. One plant may produce up to 6 inflorescences at a time. Flowering occurs throughout June and July. The diploid chromosome count is 2n = 38. Each pollinium is completely divided into two unequal halves. The seeds are 238.7 μm long and 81.2 μm wide.

== Gallery ==
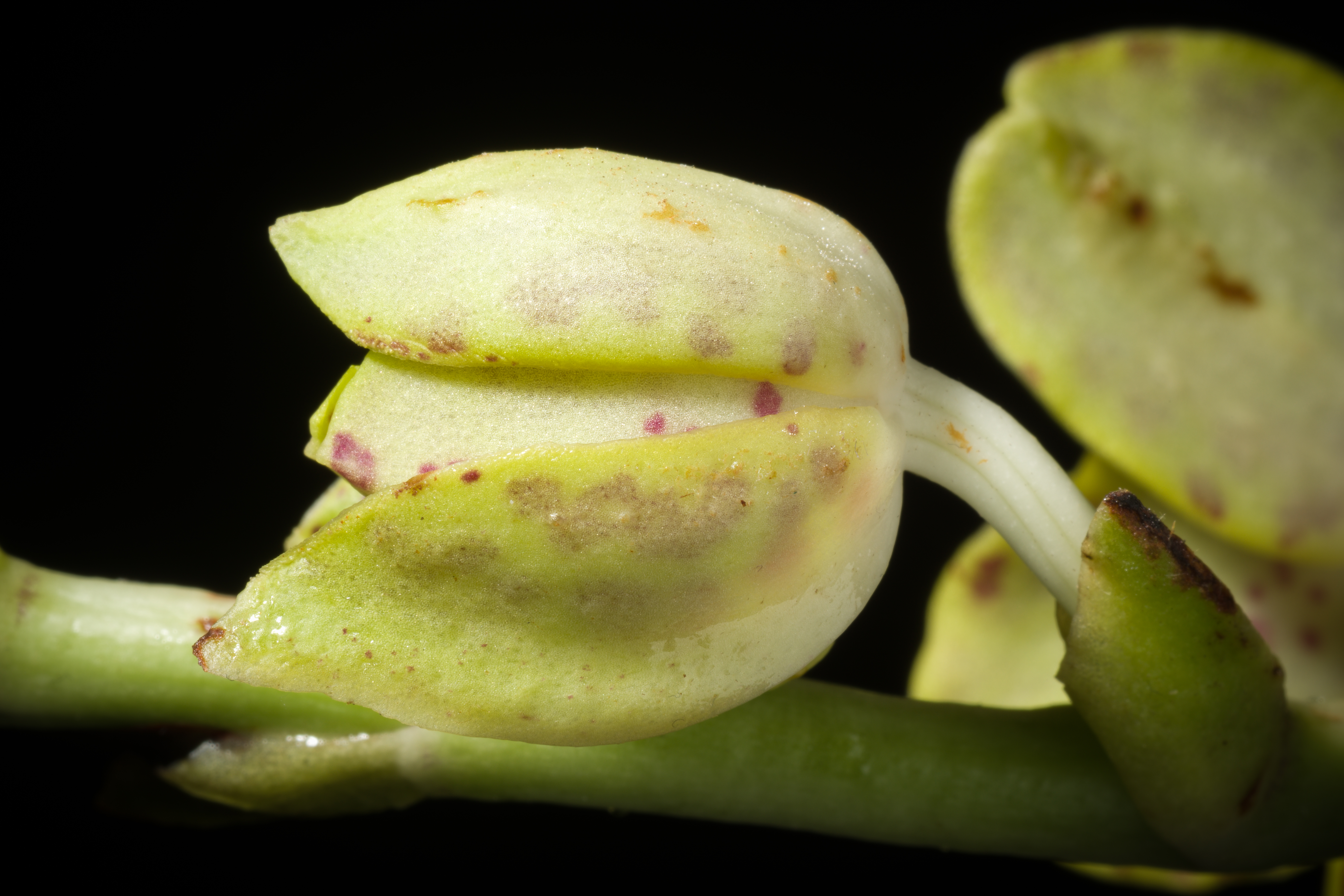
Lateral view of flower bud in the process of opening

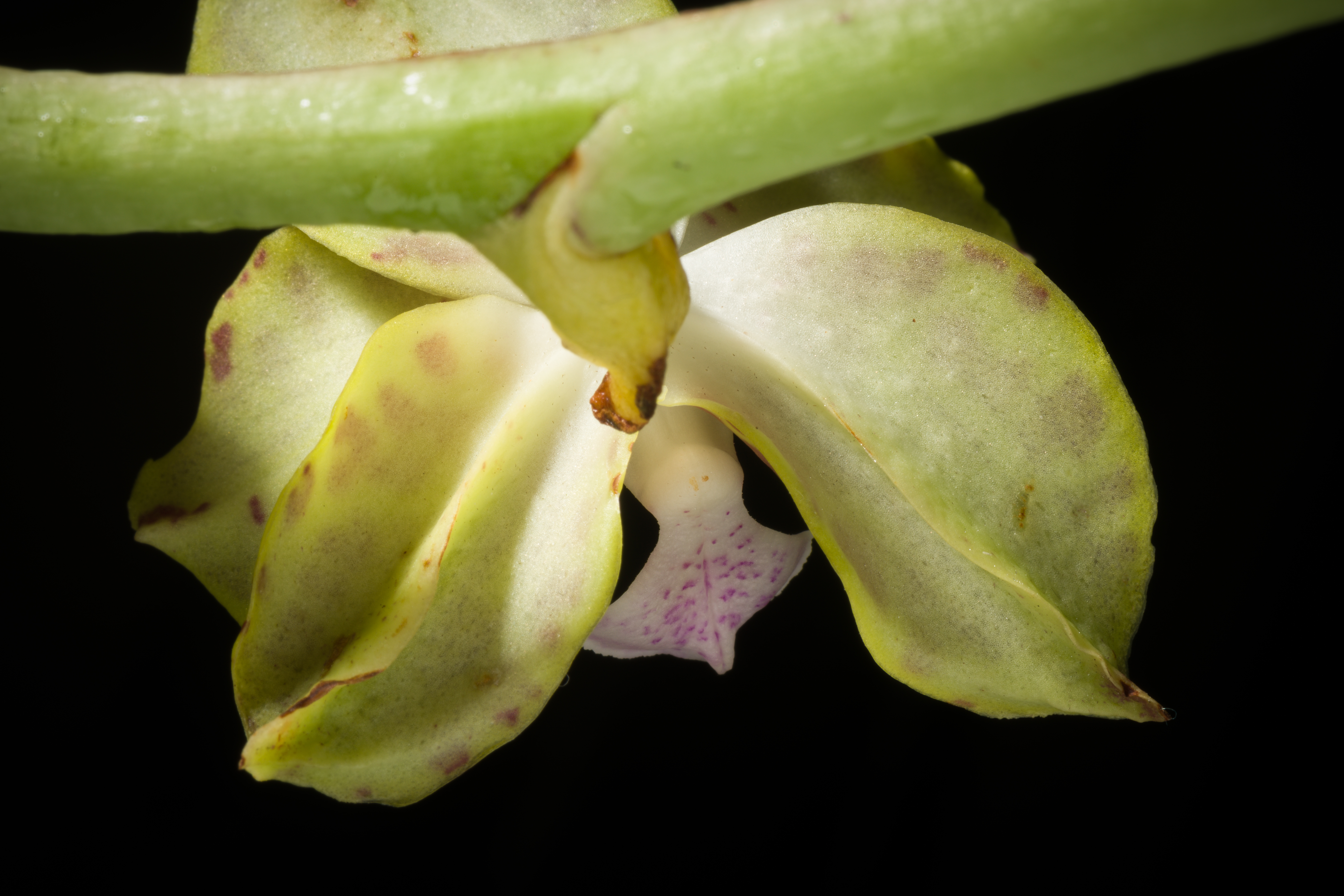
Flower viewed from behind

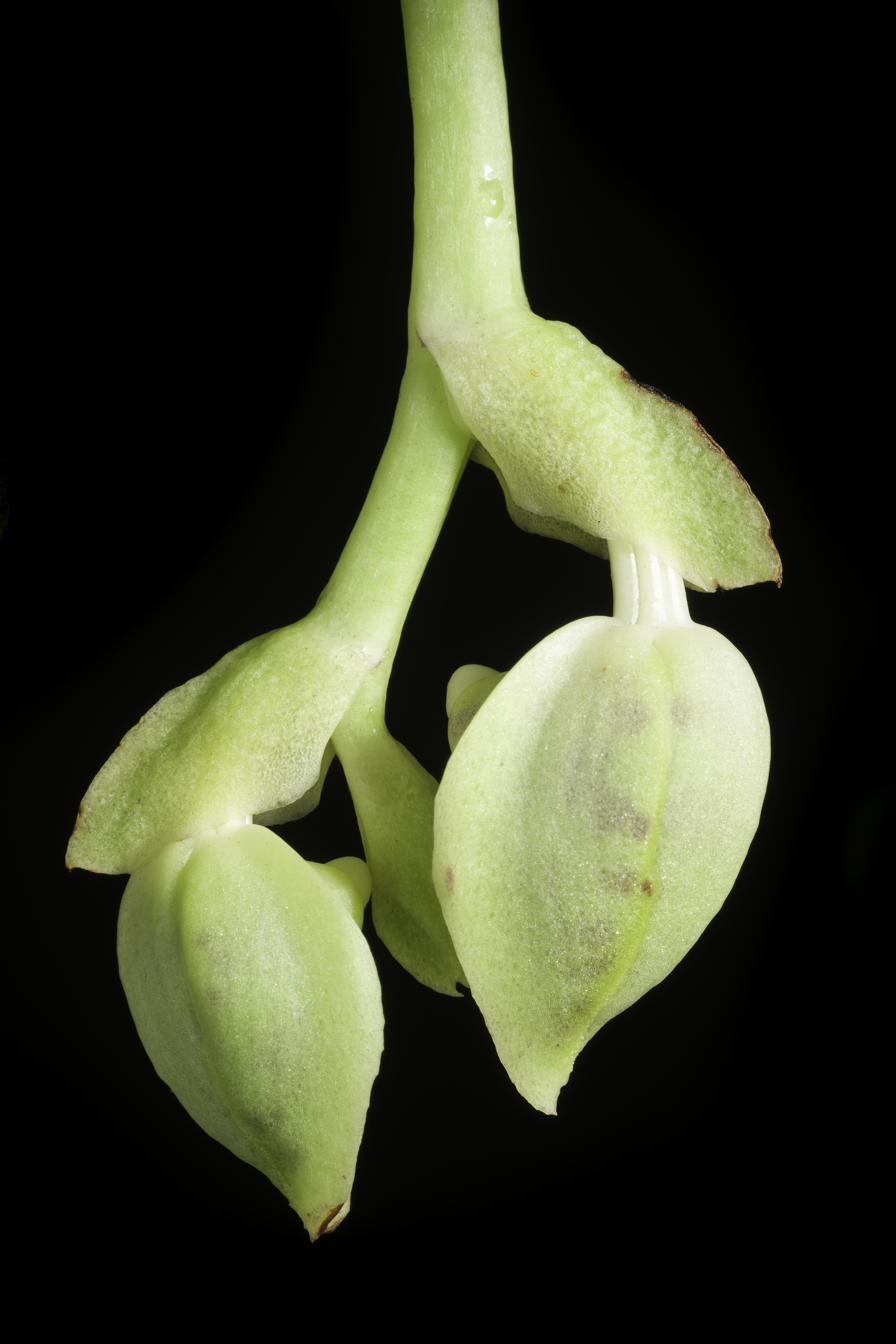
Lateral view of fully closed, spurred flower buds

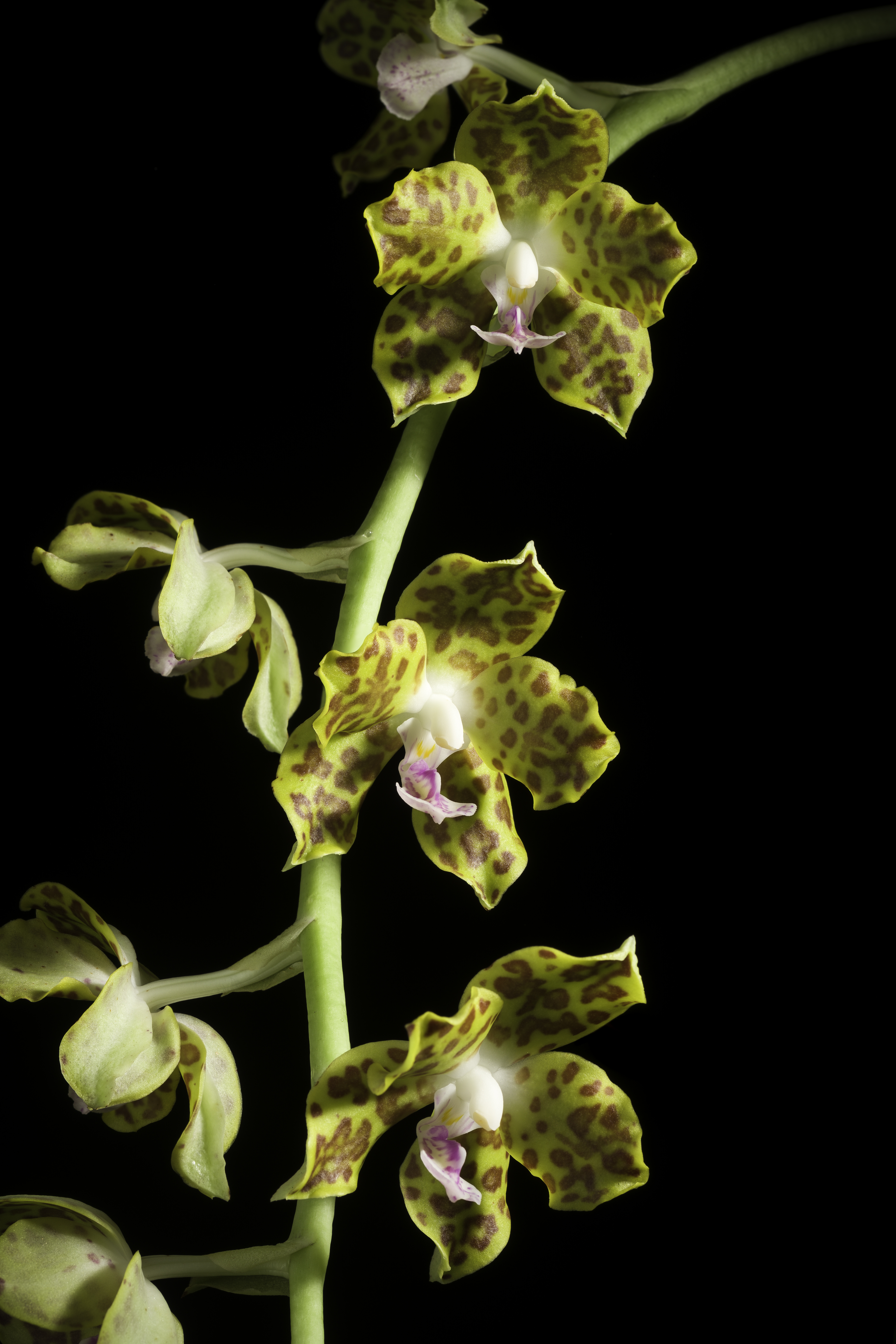
Flowers growing on a pendent inflorescence

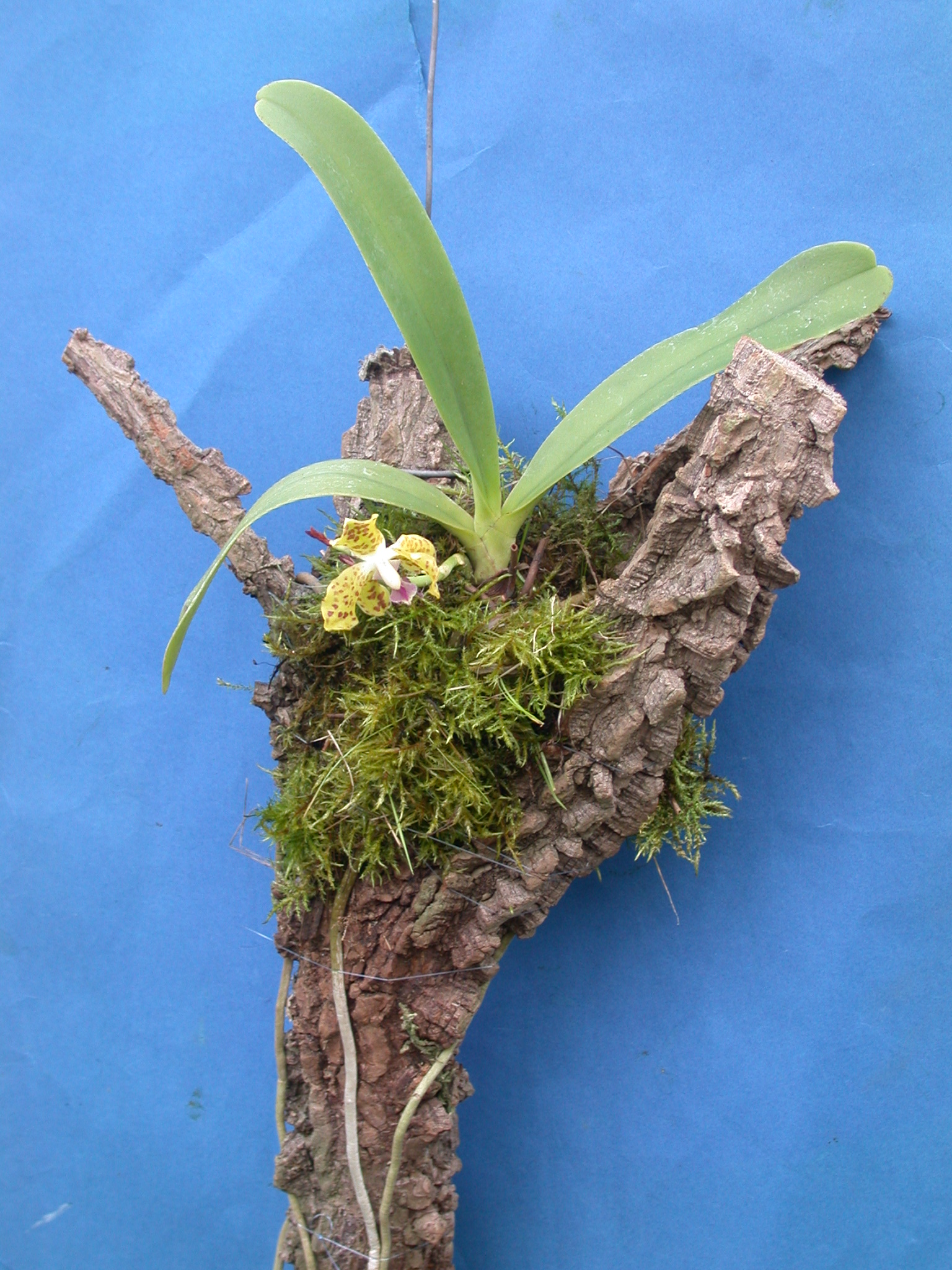
Flowering specimen mounted on a branch with moss

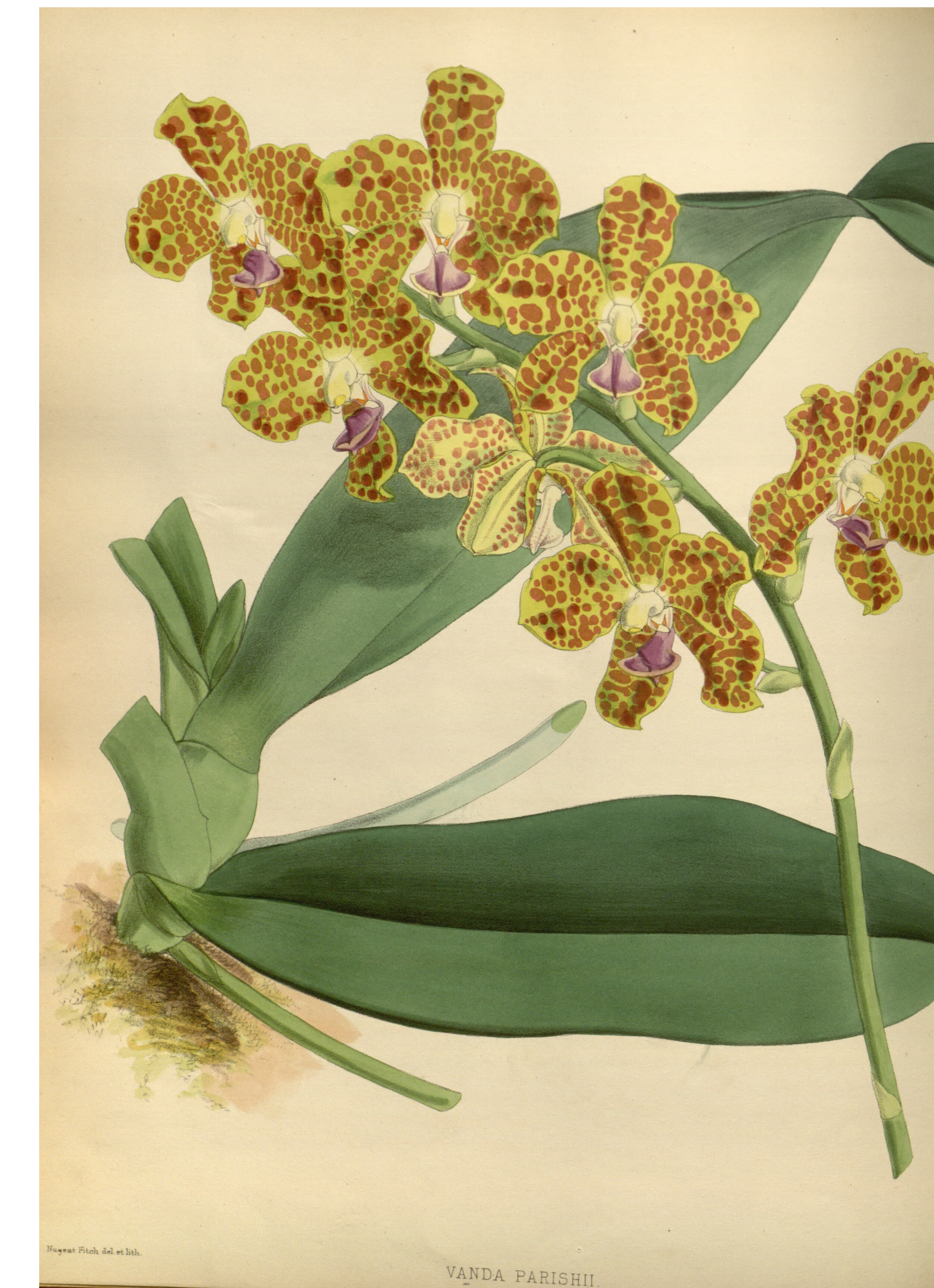
Botanical illustration of Phalaenopsis hygrochila as Vanda parishii

== Ecology ==
The plants are found in open forests in elevations of 700–1300 m.

== Conservation ==
This species is protected unter the CITES appendix II regulations of international trade.

== Horticulture ==
It has been utilized as an ornamental plant and cut flowers have been traded commercially, both locally and internationally. Artificial propagation and genetic transformation protocols were established.
