= Languages of India =

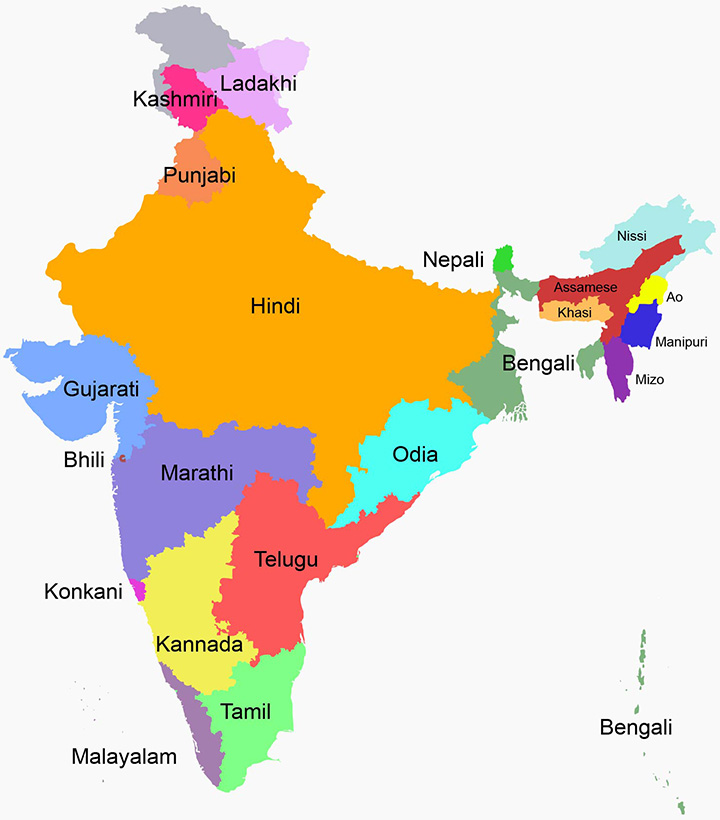
- Languages of India
- Official: Official; Hindi; English (Note: According to Part XVII of the Constitution of India, Hindi in the Devanagari script is the official language of the Union, along with English as an additional official language. States and union territories can have a different official language of their own other than Hindi or English.); Scheduled; State level and Eighth Schedule: Eighth Schedule; Assamese; Bengali; Boro; Dogri; Gujarati; Hindi; Kannada; Kashmiri; Konkani; Maithili; Malayalam; Manipuri; Marathi; Nepali; Odia; Punjabi; Sanskrit; Santali; Sindhi; Tamil; Telugu; Urdu; State level (Note: Not all the state-level official languages are in the Eighth Schedule, and not all the scheduled languages are state-level official languages. For example, the Sindhi language is an 8th scheduled language but not a state-level official language.); Bhujel; Garo; Khasi; Kokborok; Lepcha; Limbu; Magar; Mizo; Newar; Rai; Sherpa; Sikkimese; Sunuwar; Tamang; all the 8th scheduled languages – except Sindhi, Kashmiri and Dogri (Note: Kashmiri and Dogri language are the official languages of Jammu and Kashmir which is currently a union territory and no longer the former state.)
- Signed: Indo-Pakistani Sign Language; Alipur Sign Language; Naga Sign Language (extinct)
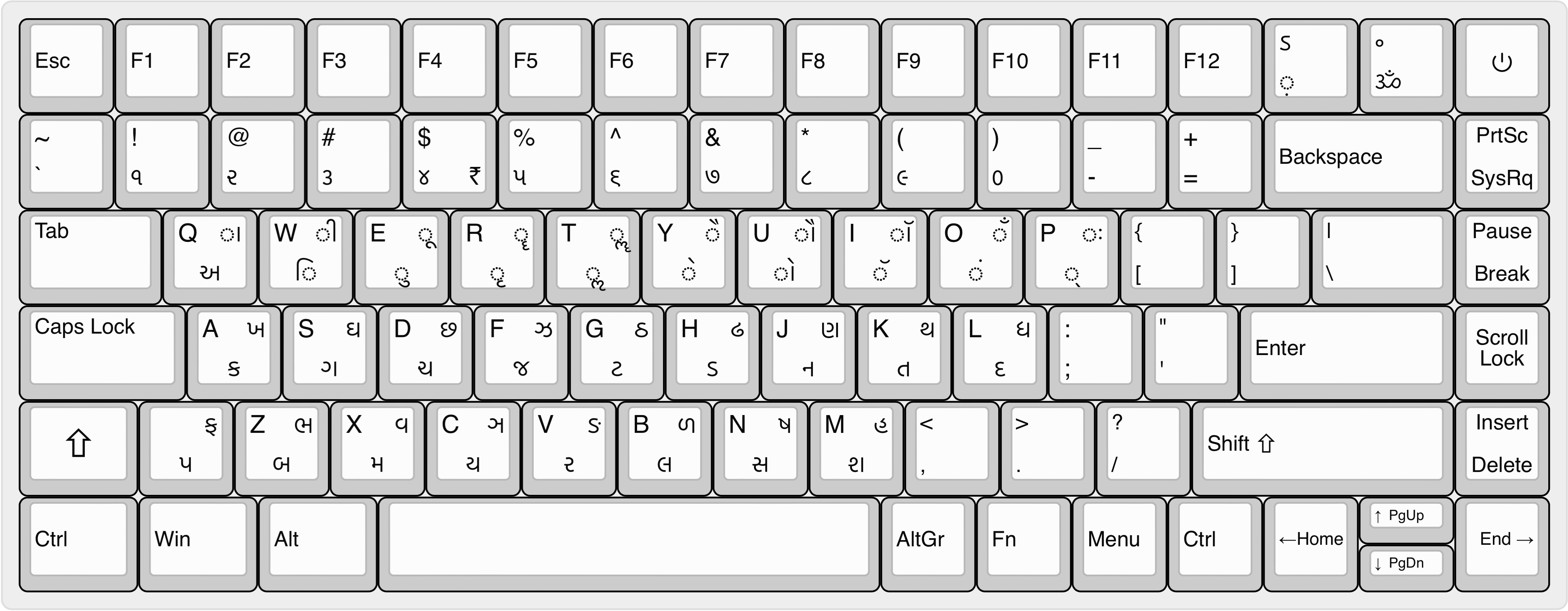
- Keyboard layout: QWERTY and InScript keyboard

Languages of India belong to several language families, the major ones being the Indo-Aryan languages spoken by 78.05% of Indians and the Dravidian languages spoken by 19.64% of Indians; both families together are sometimes known as Indic languages. (Note: In modern and colloquial contexts, the term "Indic" generally refers to the languages of the Indian subcontinent, thus also including non-Indo-Aryan languages.) Languages spoken by the remaining 2.31% of the population belong to the Austroasiatic, Sino–Tibetan, Tai–Kadai, Andamanese, and a few other minor language families and isolates. According to the People's Linguistic Survey of India, India has the second highest number of languages (780), after Papua New Guinea (841). Ethnologue lists a lower number of 459.

Article 343 of the Constitution of India stated that the official language of the Union is Hindi in Devanagari script, with official use of English to continue for 15 years. Opposition to increased Hindi usage in South India led to the passage of the Official Languages Act in 1963, amending the constitution to allow for the continuation of English alongside Hindi in the Indian government indefinitely. The form of numerals to be used for the official purposes of the Union are "the international form of Indian numerals", which are referred to as Arabic numerals in most English-speaking countries. Despite some misconceptions, Hindi is not the national language of India; the Constitution of India does not give any language the status of national language.

The Eighth Schedule of the Indian Constitution lists 22 languages, which have been referred to as scheduled languages and given recognition, status and official encouragement. In addition, the Government of India has awarded the distinction of classical language to Assamese, Bengali, Kannada, Malayalam, Marathi, Odia, Pali, Prakrit, Sanskrit, Tamil and Telugu. This status is given to languages that have a rich heritage and independent nature.

According to the Census of India of 2001, India has 122 major languages and 1599 other languages. However, figures from other sources vary, primarily due to differences in the definition of the terms "language" and "dialect". The 2001 Census recorded 30 languages which were spoken by more than a million native speakers and 122 which were spoken by more than 10,000 people. Three contact languages have played an important role in the history of India in chronological order: Sanskrit, Persian and English. Persian was the court language during the Indo-Muslim period in India and reigned as an administrative language for several centuries until the era of British colonisation. English continues to be an important language in India. It is used in higher education and in some areas of the Indian government.

Hindi, which has the largest number of first-language speakers in India today, serves as the lingua franca across much of northern and central India. However, there have been concerns raised with Hindi being imposed in South India, most notably in the states of Tamil Nadu and Karnataka. Some in Maharashtra, West Bengal, Assam, Punjab, Kerala and other non-Hindi regions have also started to voice concerns about imposition of Hindi. Bengali is the second most spoken and understood language in the country with a significant number of speakers in eastern and northeastern regions. Marathi is the third most spoken and understood language in the country with a significant number of speakers in the southwest, followed closely by Telugu, which is most commonly spoken in southeastern areas.

Hindi is the fastest growing language of India due to its demonstrably disproportionate funding, support and patronage by the Union/Federal government and to the detriment of other more ancient and classical languages listed in the Eighth schedule of the constitution, followed by Kashmiri in the second place, with Meitei (officially called Manipuri) as well as Gujarati, in the third place, and Bengali in the fourth place, according to the 2011 census of India.

According to Ethnologue, India has 148 Sino-Tibetan, 140 Indo-European, 84 Dravidian, 32 Austro-Asiatic, 14 Andamanese, and 5 Kra-Dai languages.

== History ==
The Southern Indian languages are from the Dravidian family. The Dravidian languages are indigenous to the Indian subcontinent. Proto-Dravidian languages were spoken in India in the 4th millennium BCE and started disintegrating into various branches around 3rd millennium BCE. The Dravidian languages are classified in four groups: North, Central (Kolami–Parji), South-Central (Telugu–Kui), and South Dravidian (Tamil-Kannada).

The Northern Indian languages from the Indo-Aryan branch of the Indo-European family evolved from Old Indo-Aryan by way of the Middle Indo-Aryan Prakrit languages and Apabhraṃśa of the Middle Ages. The Indo-Aryan languages developed and emerged in three stages — Old Indo-Aryan (1500 BCE to 600 BCE), Middle Indo-Aryan stage (600 BCE and 1000 CE), and New Indo-Aryan (between 1000 CE and 1300 CE). The modern north Indian Indo-Aryan languages all evolved into distinct, recognizable languages in the New Indo-Aryan Age.

In Northeast India, among the Sino-Tibetan languages, Meitei language (officially known as Manipuri language) was the court language of the Manipur Kingdom (Meitei: Meeteileipak). It was honoured before and during the darbar sessions before Manipur was merged into the Dominion of the Indian Republic. Its history of existence spans from 1500 to 2000 years according to most eminent scholars including Padma Vibhushan awardee Suniti Kumar Chatterji. Even according to the "Manipur State Constitution Act, 1947" of the once independent Manipur, Manipuri and English were made the court languages of the kingdom (before merging into Indian Republic).

Persian, or Farsi, was brought into India by the Ghaznavids and other Turko-Afghan dynasties as the court language. Culturally Persianised, they, in combination with the later Mughal dynasty (of Turco-Mongol origin), influenced the art, history, and literature of the region for more than 500 years, resulting in the Persianisation of many Indian tongues, mainly lexically. In 1837, the British replaced Persian with English and Hindustani in Perso-Arabic script for administrative purposes and the Hindi movement of the 19th Century replaced Persianised vocabulary with Sanskrit derivations and replaced or supplemented the use of Perso-Arabic script for administrative purposes with Devanagari.

Each of the northern Indian languages had different influences. For example, Hindustani was strongly influenced by Sanskrit, Arabic and Persian, leading to the emergence of Modern Standard Hindi and Modern Standard Urdu as registers of the Hindustani language. Bangla on the other hand has retained its Sanskritic roots while heavily expanding its vocabulary with words from Persian, English, French and other foreign languages.

== Inventories ==
The first official survey of language diversity in the Indian subcontinent was carried out by Sir George Abraham Grierson from 1898 to 1928. Titled the Linguistic Survey of India, it reported a total of 179 languages and 544 dialects. However, the results were skewed due to ambiguities in distinguishing between "dialect" and "language", use of untrained personnel and under-reporting of data from South India, as the former provinces of Burma and Madras, as well as the princely states of Cochin, Hyderabad, Mysore and Travancore were not included in the survey.

Different sources give widely differing figures, primarily based on how the terms "language" and "dialect" are defined and grouped. Ethnologue, produced by the Christian evangelist organisation SIL International, lists 435 tongues for India (out of 6,912 worldwide). These languages are further subclassified in Ethnologue as follows:

- Institutional – 45
- Stable – 248
- Endangered – 131
- Extinct – 11

The People's Linguistic Survey of India, a privately owned research institution in India, has recorded over 66 different scripts and more than 780 languages in India during its nationwide survey, which the organisation claims to be the biggest linguistic survey in India.

The People of India (POI) project of Anthropological Survey of India reported 325 languages which are used for in-group communication by 5,633 Indian communities.

=== Census of India figures ===
The Census of India records and publishes data with respect to the number of speakers for languages and dialects, but uses its own unique terminology, distinguishing between language and mother tongue. The mother tongues are grouped within each language. Many of the mother tongues so defined could be considered a language rather than a dialect by linguistic standards. This is especially so for many mother tongues with tens of millions of speakers that are officially grouped under the language Hindi.

1951 Census

Separate figures for Hindi, Urdu, and Punjabi were not issued, due to the fact the returns were intentionally recorded incorrectly in states such as East Punjab, Himachal Pradesh, Delhi, PEPSU, and Bilaspur.

1961 Census

The 1961 census recognised 1,652 mother tongues spoken by 438,936,918 people, counting all declarations made by any individual at the time when the census was conducted. However, the declaring individuals often mixed names of languages with those of dialects, subdialects and dialect clusters or even castes, professions, religions, localities, regions, countries and nationalities. The list therefore includes languages with barely a few individual speakers as well as 530 unclassified mother tongues and more than 100 idioms that are non-native to India, including linguistically unspecific demonyms such as "African", "Canadian" or "Belgian".

1991 Census

The 1991 census recognises 1,576 classified mother tongues. According to the 1991 census, 22 languages had more than a million native speakers, 50 had more than 100,000 and 114 had more than 10,000 native speakers. The remaining accounted for a total of 566,000 native speakers (out of a total of 838 million Indians in 1991).

2001 Census

According to the census of 2001, there are 1,635 rationalised mother tongues, 234 identifiable mother tongues and 22 major languages. Of these, 29 languages have more than a million native speakers, 60 have more than 100,000 and 122 have more than 10,000 native speakers. There are a few languages like Kodava that do not have a script but have a group of native speakers in Coorg (Kodagu).

2011 Census

According to the most recent census of 2011, after thorough linguistic scrutiny, edit, and rationalisation on 19,569 raw linguistic affiliations, the census recognises 1,369 rationalised mother tongues and 1,474 names which were treated as 'unclassified' and relegated to 'other' mother tongue category. Among, the 1,369 rationalised mother tongues which are spoken by 10,000 or more speakers, are further grouped into appropriate set that resulted into total 121 languages. In these 121 languages, 22 are already part of the Eighth Schedule to the Constitution of India and the other 99 are termed as "Total of other languages" which is one short as of the other languages recognised in 2001 census.

== Multilingualism ==
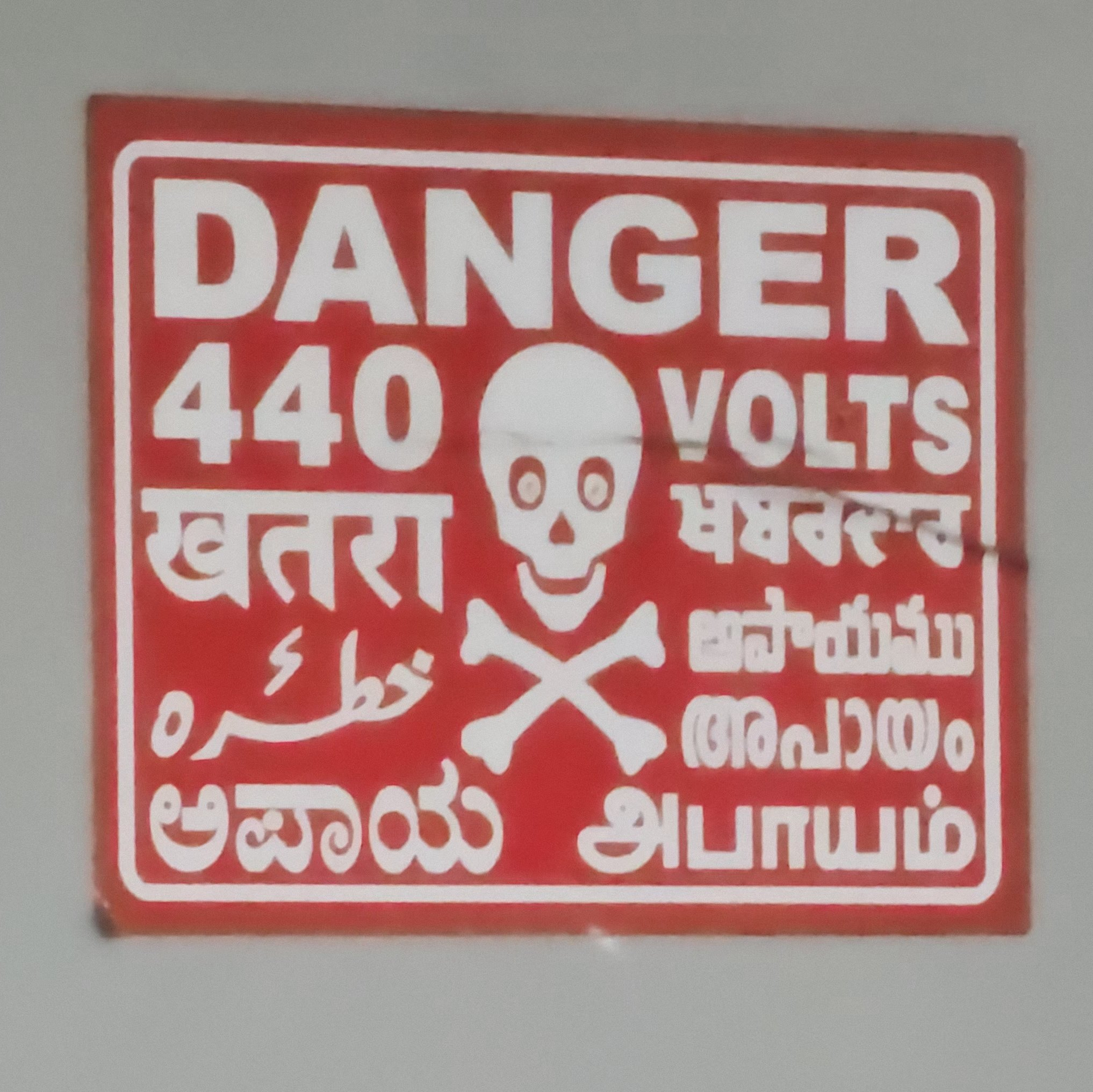
A danger sign in India containing eight languages, all using different scripts.

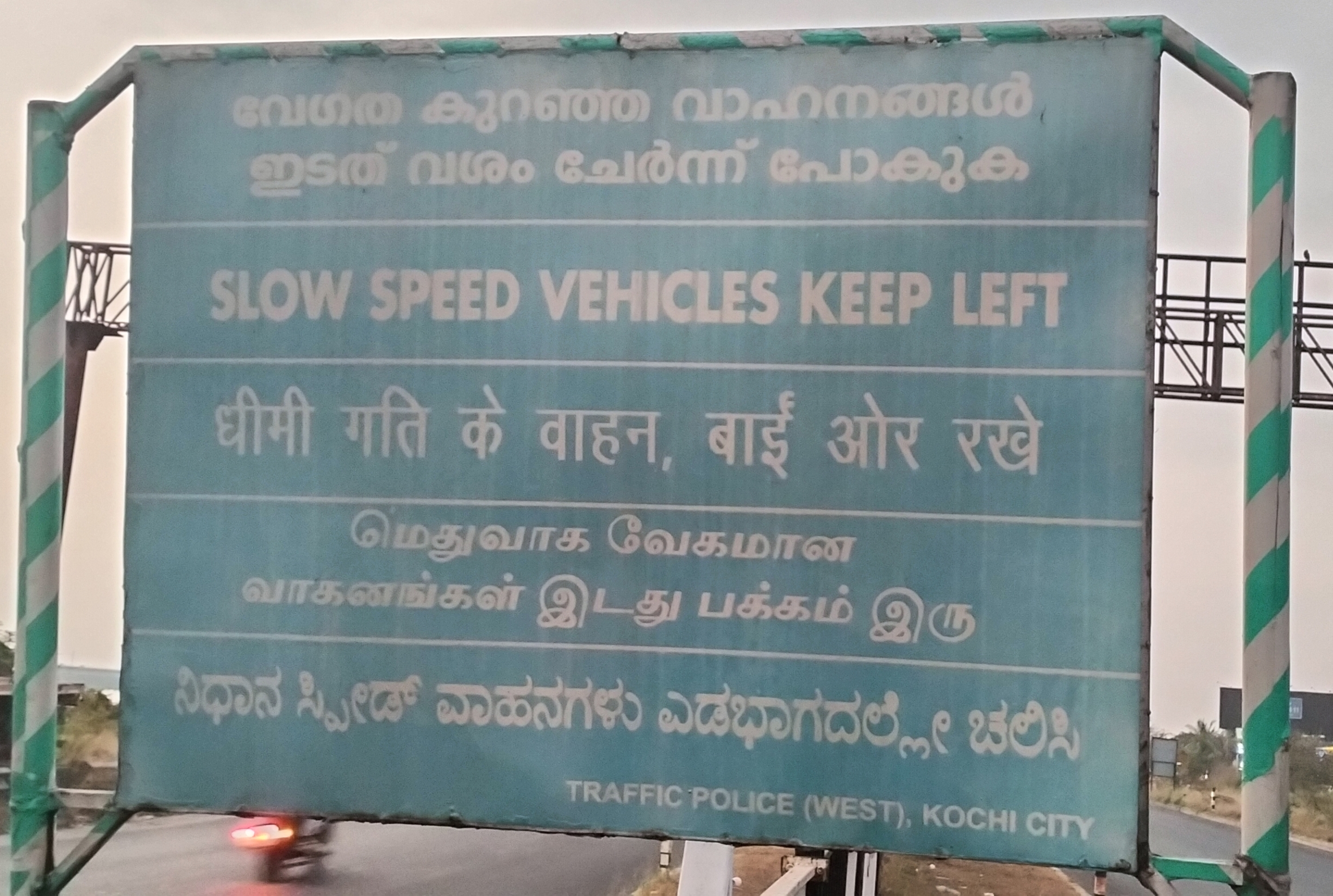
A pentalingual highway sign in Kochi written in Malayalam, English, Hindi, Tamil and Kannada.

=== 2011 Census India ===
Languages in India (2011)
1. Hindi (43.6%)
2. Bengali (8.30%)
3. Marathi (6.83%)
4. Telugu (6.70%)
5. Tamil (5.70%)
6. Gujarati (4.58%)
7. Urdu (4.19%)
8. Kannada (3.61%)
9. Odia (3.10%)
10. Malayalam (2.88%)
11. Punjabi (2.74%)
12. Assamese (1.16%)
13. Maithili (1.12%)
14. Santali (0.61%)
15. Meitei (0.15%)
16. Bodo (0.12%)
17. Others (5.19%)

First, second, and third languages by number of speakers in India (2011 Census)
Language	Language Family	First language speakers		Second language speakers	Third language speakers	Total speakers	
Language	Language Family	Figure	% of total population	Second language speakers	Third language speakers	Figure	% of total population
**Hindi** (Note: Hindi does not merely refer to "Modern Standard Hindi" (which is based on the Dehlavi dialect of Kauravi), but also broadly to many "Hindi languages", which include Western Hindi (apart from Urdu), Eastern Hindi, the Bihari languages except for Maithili, the Rajasthani languages, and the Pahari languages apart from Nepali and (in 2001) Dogri, whether or not the included varieties were reported as "Hindi" or under their individual names in the census.)	Indo-Aryan	528,347,193	43.63%	138,909,608	24,307,234	691,564,035	57.11%
**English**	Germanic	259,678	0.02%	82,717,239	45,562,173	128,539,090	10.62%
Bengali	Indo-Aryan	97,237,669	8.03%	9,095,810	1,138,764	107,472,243	8.88%
Marathi	Indo-Aryan	83,026,680	6.86%	13,001,079	3,031,027	99,058,786	8.18%
Telugu	Dravidian	81,127,740	6.70%	12,167,609	1,206,254	94,501,603	7.80%
Tamil	Dravidian	69,026,881	5.70%	6,668,000	900,985	76,595,866	6.33%
Urdu (Note: Although linguistically, Modern Standard Hindi and Urdu are classified together as a single language called Hindustani, the government classifies them as separate languages instead of different standard registers of the same language due to socio-political reasons.)	Indo-Aryan	50,772,631	4.19%	11,348,978	1,117,836	63,239,445	5.22%
Gujarati	Indo-Aryan	55,492,554	4.58%	4,017,825	778,930	60,289,309	4.98%
Kannada	Dravidian	43,706,512	3.61%	13,609,709	1,434,578	58,750,799	4.85%
Odia	Indo-Aryan	37,521,324	3.10%	4,670,796	397,213	42,589,333	3.52%
Punjabi	Indo-Aryan	33,124,726	2.74%	2,237,126	719,901	36,081,753	2.98%
Malayalam	Dravidian	34,838,819	2.88%	581,591	218,932	35,639,342	2.94%
Assamese	Indo-Aryan	15,311,351	1.26%	7,583,346	734,379	23,629,076	1.95%
Maithili	Indo-Aryan	13,583,464	1.12%	651,987	48,843	14,284,294	1.18%
Santali	Austroasiatic	7,368,192	0.61%	278,448	76,663	7,723,303	0.64%
Kashmiri	Indo-Aryan	6,797,587	0.56%	127,039	70,197	6,994,823	0.58%
Nepali	Indo-Aryan	2,926,168	0.24%	366,648	143,798	3,436,614	0.28%
Sanskrit	Indo-Aryan	24,821	0.002%	1,134,362	1,963,640	3,122,823	0.26%
Sindhi	Indo-Aryan	2,772,264	0.23%	281,177	48,591	3,102,032	0.26%
Dogri	Indo-Aryan	2,596,767	0.21%	126,334	40,883	2,763,984	0.23%
Konkani	Indo-Aryan	2,256,502	0.19%	238,345	87,134	2,581,981	0.21%
Meitei	Sino-Tibetan	1,761,079	0.15%	384,357	101,690	2,247,126	0.19%
Bodo	Sino-Tibetan	1,482,929	0.12%	57,583	20,132	1,560,644	0.13%

Bolded languages are federally official.

== Language families ==
Languages of India by language families (Ethnologue)
1. Sino-Tibetan (34.9%)
2. Indo-European (33.0%)
3. Dravidian (19.8%)
4. Austroasiatic (7.54%)
5. Andamanese (3.30%)
6. Kra–Dai (1.17%)
7. Isolates (0.23%)

Ethnolinguistically, the languages of South Asia, echoing the complex history and geography of the region, form a complex patchwork of language families, language phyla and isolates. Languages spoken in India belong to several language families, the major ones being the Indo-Aryan languages spoken by 78.05% of Indians and the Dravidian languages spoken by 19.64% of Indians. The most important language families in terms of speakers are:

Language family	Population (2011 census)	Pct.
Indo-European	945,333,910	78.072%
Dravidian	237,840,116	19.642%
Austroasiatic	13,493,080	1.114%
Sino-Tibetan	12,257,382	1.012%
Kra–Dai	16,806	0.001%
Other languages	1,913,681	0.158%
Total speaker/population	1,210,854,977	100%

=== Indo-Aryan language family ===
Present-day geographical distribution of the major Indo-Aryan language groups. Romani, Domari, Kholosi, Luwati, and Lomavren are outside the scope of the map. Pashai (Dardic) Khowar (Dardic) Shina (Dardic) Kohistani (Dardic) Kashmiri (Dardic) Punjabi (Northwestern) Sindhi (Northwestern) Rajasthani (Western) Gujarati (Western) Khandeshi (Western) Bhili (Western) Western Pahari (Northern) Central Pahari (Northern) Eastern Pahari (Northern) Western Hindi (Central) Eastern Hindi (Central) Bengali-Assamese (Eastern) Bihari (Eastern) Odia (Eastern) Halbic (Eastern) Marathi-Konkani (Southern) Sinhala (Southern) Dhivehi (Southern) (not shown: Kunar (Dardic), Chinali-Lahuli (Unclassified))

The largest of the language families represented in India, in terms of speakers, is the Indo-Aryan language family, a branch of the Indo-Iranian family, itself the easternmost, extant subfamily of the Indo-European language family. This language family predominates, accounting for some 1035 million speakers, or over 76.5% of the population, per a 2018 estimate. The most widely spoken languages of this group are Hindi, (Note: Although linguistically Hindi and Urdu are the same language called Hindustani, the government classifies them as separate languages instead of different standard registers of same language.) Bengali, Marathi, Gujarati, Bhojpuri, Awadhi, Odia, Maithili, Punjabi, Marwari, Kashmiri, Assamese (Asamiya), Chhattisgarhi and Sindhi. Aside from the Indo-Aryan languages, other Indo-European languages are also spoken in India, the most prominent of which is English, as a lingua franca.

=== Dravidian language family ===
Distribution of the Dravidian languages

The second largest language family is the Dravidian language family, accounting for some 277 million speakers, or approximately 20.5% per 2018 estimate. The Dravidian languages are spoken mainly in southern India and parts of eastern and central India as well as in parts of northeastern Sri Lanka, Pakistan, Nepal and Bangladesh. The Dravidian languages with the most speakers are Telugu, Tamil, Kannada and Malayalam. Besides the mainstream population, Dravidian languages are also spoken by small scheduled tribe communities, such as the Oraon and Gond tribes. Only two Dravidian languages are exclusively spoken outside India, Brahui in Balochistan, Pakistan and Dhangar, a dialect of Kurukh, in Nepal.

=== Austroasiatic language family ===
Approximate distribution of the Austroasiatic languages in India

Families with smaller numbers of speakers are Austroasiatic and numerous small Sino-Tibetan languages, with some 10 and 6 million speakers, respectively, together 3% of the population.

The Austroasiatic language family (austro meaning South) is the autochthonous language in Southeast Asia, arrived by migration. Austroasiatic languages of mainland India are the Khasi and Munda languages, including Bhumij and Santali. The languages of the Nicobar islands also form part of this language family. With the exceptions of Khasi and Santali, all Austroasiatic languages on Indian territory are endangered.

=== Tibeto-Burman language family ===
The Tibeto-Burman language family is well represented in India. However, their interrelationships are not discernible, and the family has been described as "a patch of leaves on the forest floor" rather than with the conventional metaphor of a "family tree".

Padma Vibhushan awardee Indian Bengali scholar Suniti Kumar Chatterjee said, "Among the various Tibeto-Burman languages, the most important and in literature certainly of much greater importance than Newari, is the Meitei or Manipuri language".

In India, Tibeto-Burman languages are spoken across the Himalayas in the regions of Arunachal Pradesh, Assam (hills and autonomous councils), Himachal Pradesh, Ladakh, Manipur, Meghalaya, Mizoram, Nagaland, Sikkim, Tripura and West Bengal.

Sino-Tibetan languages spoken in India include two constitutionally recognised official languages, Meitei (officially known as Manipuri) and Bodo as well as the non-scheduled languages like Karbi, Deori, Lepcha, and many varieties of several related Tibetic, West Himalayish, Tani, Brahmaputran, Angami–Pochuri, Tangkhul, Zeme, Kukish sub linguistic branches, among many others.

=== Kra–Dai language family ===
The Ahom language, a Southwestern Tai language, had been once the dominant language of the Ahom Kingdom in modern-day Assam, but was later replaced by the Assamese language (known as Kamrupi in ancient era which is the pre-form of the Kamrupi dialect of today). Nowadays, small Tai communities and their languages remain in Assam and Arunachal Pradesh together with Sino-Tibetans, e.g. Tai Phake, Tai Aiton and Tai Khamti, which are similar to the Shan language of Shan State, Myanmar; the Dai language of Yunnan, China; the Lao language of Laos; the Thai language of Thailand; and the Zhuang language in Guangxi, China.

=== Andamanese language families ===
The languages of the Andaman Islands form another group:

- the Great Andamanese languages, comprising a number of extinct, and one highly endangered language Aka-Jeru.
- the Ongan family of the southern Andaman Islands, comprising two extant languages, Önge and Jarawa, and one extinct language, Jangil.

In addition, Sentinelese is thought likely to be related to the above languages.

=== Language isolates ===
The only language found in the Indian mainland that is considered a language isolate is Nihali. The status of Nihali is ambiguous, having been considered as a distinct Austroasiatic language, as a dialect of Korku and also as being a "thieves' argot" rather than a legitimate language.

The other language isolates found in the rest of South Asia include Burushaski, a language mostly spoken in Gilgit–Baltistan administered by Pakistan with a few hundred speakers in Jammu Kashmir and Ladakh in India, Kusunda in western Nepal (originally considered Sino Tibetan due to adjacency but now a well established isolate), and Vedda in Sri Lanka. The validity of the Great Andamanese language group as a language family has been questioned and it has been considered a language isolate by some authorities. Roger Blench classifies the Shompen language of the Nicobar Islands as a language isolate. The enigma Bhutanese and Arunachali languages like Hrusish, Puroik, Koro, Digarish, Gongduk etc, which were long assumed to be Sino-Tibetan languages due to proximity, may actually be language isolates. Some still consider them to be really divergent Sino Tibetan languages with heavy substrata influences and archaic Proto Sino Tibetan retentions.

=== Other families ===
In addition, a Bantu language, Sidi, was spoken until the mid-20th century in Gujarat by the Siddi.

== Official languages ==
Official languages of India by state and union territory. Hindustani refers to both Hindi and Urdu in this map.

=== Federal level ===
After Mughal rule and prior to Independence, in British India, English was the sole language used for administrative purposes as well as for higher education purposes.

In 1946, the issue of national language was a bitterly contested subject in the proceedings of the Constituent Assembly of India, specifically what should be the language in which the Constitution of India is written and the language spoken during the proceedings of Parliament and thus deserving of the epithet "national". The Constitution of India does not give any language the status of national language.

Members belonging to the northern parts of India insisted that the Constitution be drafted in Hindi with the unofficial translation in English. This was not agreed to by the drafting committee on the grounds that English was much better to craft the nuanced prose on constitutional subjects. The efforts to make Hindi the pre-eminent language were bitterly resisted by the members from those parts of India where Hindi was not spoken natively.

Eventually, a compromise was reached not to include any mention of a national language. Instead, Hindi in Devanagari script was declared to be the official language of the union, but for "fifteen years from the commencement of the Constitution, the English Language shall continue to be used for all the official purposes of the Union for which it was being used immediately before such commencement."

Article 343 (1) of the Constitution of India states "The Official Language of the Union government shall be Hindi in Devanagari script." Unless Parliament decided otherwise, the use of English for official purposes was to cease 15 years after the constitution came into effect, i.e. on 26 January 1965.

As the date for changeover approached, however, there was much alarm in the non-Hindi-speaking areas of India, especially in Kerala, Gujarat, Maharashtra, Tamil Nadu, Punjab, West Bengal, Karnataka, Puducherry and Andhra Pradesh. Accordingly, Jawaharlal Nehru ensured the enactment of the Official Languages Act, 1963, which provided that English "may" still be used with Hindi for official purposes, even after 1965. The wording of the text proved unfortunate in that while Nehru understood that "may" meant shall, politicians championing the cause of Hindi thought it implied exactly the opposite.

In the event, as 1965 approached, India's new Prime Minister Lal Bahadur Shastri prepared to make Hindi paramount with effect from 26 January 1965. This led to widespread agitation, riots, self-immolations, and suicides in Tamil Nadu. The split of Congress politicians from the South from their party stance, the resignation of two Union ministers from the South, and the increasing threat to the country's unity forced Shastri to concede.

As a result, the proposal was dropped, and the Act itself was amended in 1967 to provide that the use of English would not be ended until a resolution to that effect was passed by the legislature of every state that had not adopted Hindi as its official language, and by each house of the Indian Parliament.

==== Hindi ====
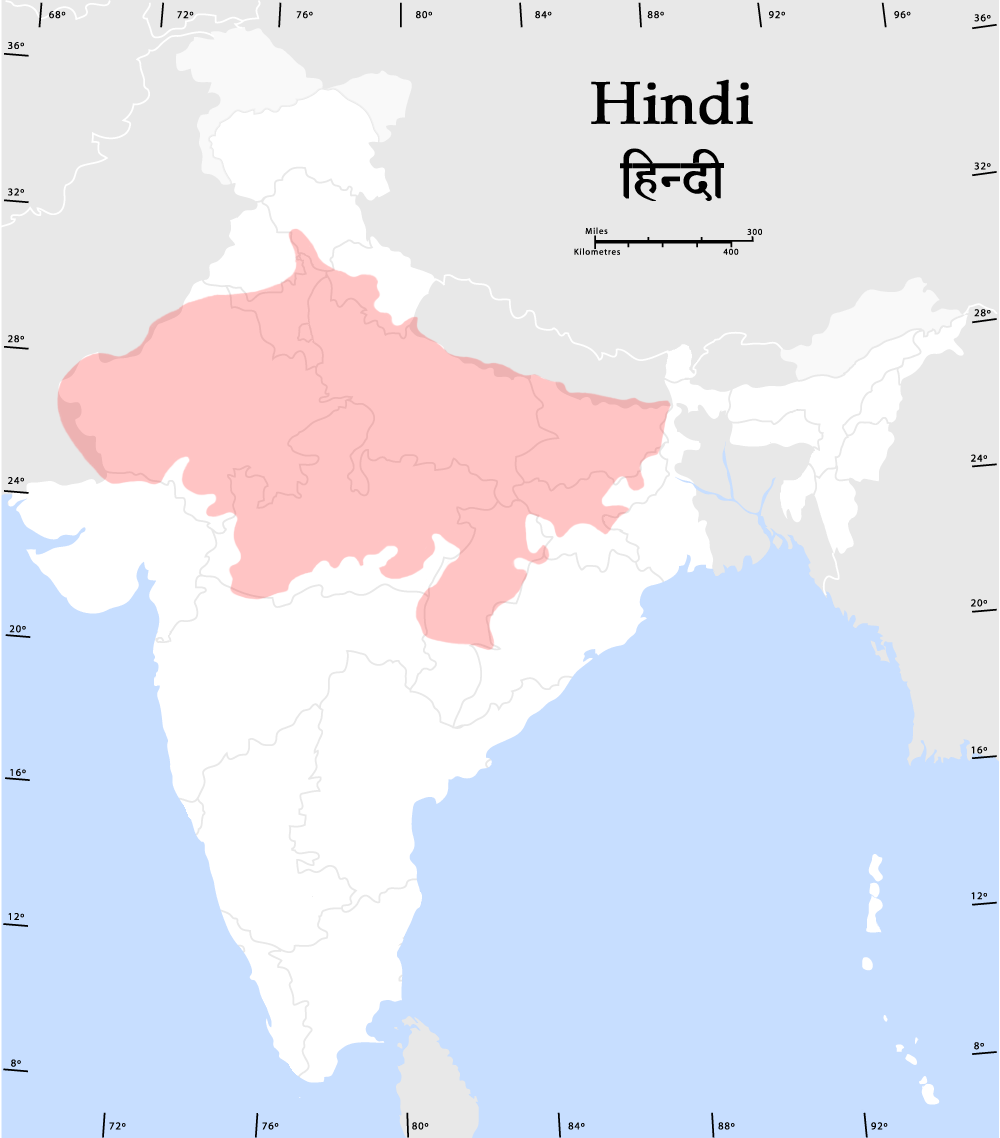
The Hindi-belt, including Hindi-related but not fully mutually intelligible languages such as Marwari and Bhojpuri

In the 2001 census, 422 million (422,048,642) people in India reported Hindi to be their native language. This figure not only included Hindi speakers of Hindustani, but also people who identify as native speakers of related languages who consider their speech to be a dialect of Hindi, the Hindi belt. Hindi (or Hindustani) is the native language of most people living in Delhi and Western Uttar Pradesh.

"Modern Standard Hindi", a standardised language is one of the official languages of the Union of India. In addition, it is one of only two languages used for business in Parliament. However, the Rajya Sabha now allows all 22 official languages on the Eighth Schedule to be spoken.

Hindustani, evolved from khari boli (खड़ी बोली), a prominent tongue of Mughal times, which itself evolved from Apabhraṃśa, an intermediary transition stage from Prakrit, from which the major North Indian Indo-Aryan languages have evolved.

By virtue of its being a lingua franca, Hindi has also developed regional dialects such as Bambaiya Hindi in Mumbai. In addition, a trade language, Andaman Creole Hindi has also developed in the Andaman Islands. In addition, by use in popular culture such as songs and films, Hindi also serves as a lingua franca across North-Central India.

Hindi is widely taught both as a primary language and language of instruction and as a second tongue in many states.

==== English ====
British colonialism in India resulted in English becoming a language for governance, business, and education. English, along with Hindi, is one of the two languages permitted in the Constitution of India for business in Parliament. Despite the fact that Hindi has official Government patronage and serves as a lingua franca over large parts of India, there was considerable opposition to the use of Hindi in the southern states of India, and English has emerged as a de facto lingua franca over much of India. Journalist Manu Joseph, in a 2011 article in The New York Times, wrote that due to the prominence and usage of the language and the desire for English-language education, "English is the de facto national language of India. It is a bitter truth." English language proficiency is highest among urban residents, wealthier Indians, Indians with higher levels of educational attainment, Christians, men and younger Indians. In 2017, more than 58 per cent of rural teens could read basic English, and 53 per cent of fourteen year-olds & sixty per cent of 18-year-olds could read English sentences.

=== Scheduled languages ===
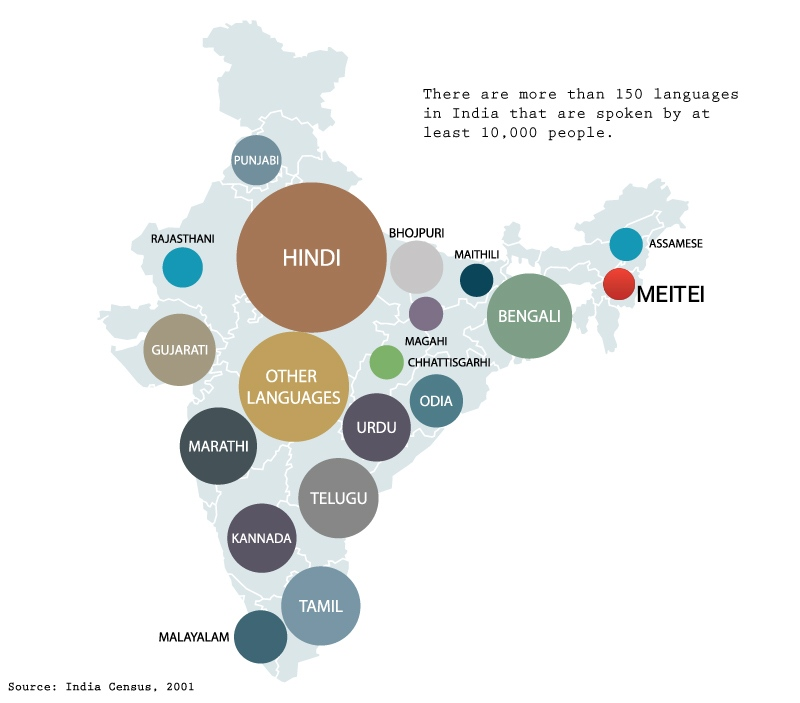
Main languages of India and their relative size according to how many speakers each has

Until the Twenty-first Amendment of the Constitution of India in 1967, the country recognised 14 official regional languages. The Eighth Schedule and the Seventy-First Amendment provided for the inclusion of Sindhi, Konkani, Meitei and Nepali, thereby increasing the number of official regional languages of India to 18. The Eighth Schedule of the Constitution of India, as of 1 December 2007, lists 22 languages, which are given in the table below together with the regions where they are used.

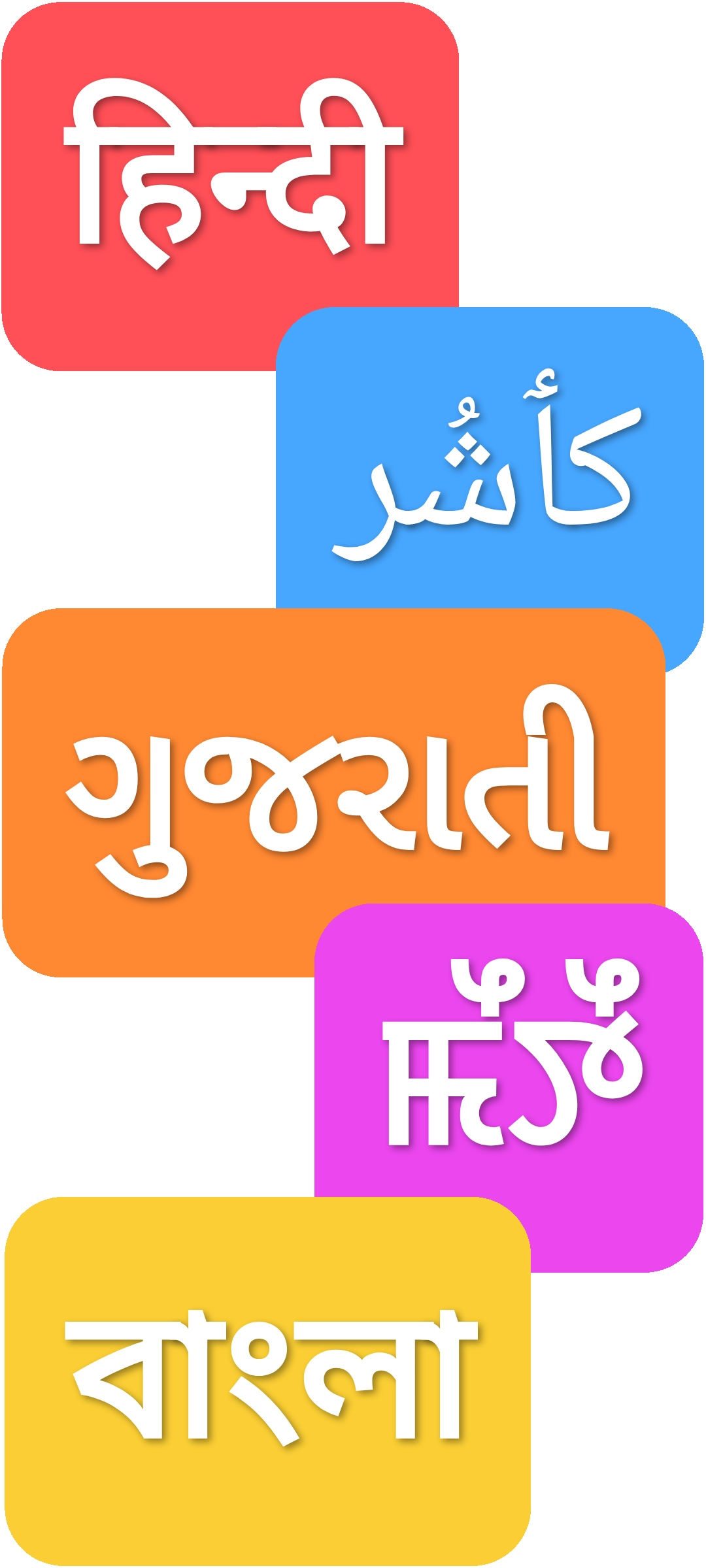
Fastest growing languages of India — Hindi (first), Kashmiri (second), Gujarati & Meitei/Manipuri (third), Bengali (fourth) — based on 2011 census of India

Language	Family	ISO 639 code
Assamese	Indo-Aryan	as
Bengali (Bangla)	Indo-Aryan	bn
Bodo	Sino-Tibetan	brx
Dogri	Indo-Aryan	doi
Gujarati	Indo-Aryan	gu
Hindi	Indo-Aryan	hi
Kannada	Dravidian	kn
Kashmiri	Indo-Aryan	ks
Konkani	Indo-Aryan	gom
Maithili	Indo-Aryan	mai
Malayalam	Dravidian	ml
Meitei (Manipuri)	Sino-Tibetan	mni
Marathi	Indo-Aryan	mr
Nepali	Indo-Aryan	ne
Odia	Indo-Aryan	or
Punjabi	Indo-Aryan	pa
Sanskrit	Indo-Aryan	sa
Santali	Austroasiatic	sat
Sindhi	Indo-Aryan	sd
Tamil	Dravidian	ta
Telugu	Dravidian	te
Urdu	Indo-Aryan	ur

The individual states, the borders of most of which are or were drawn on socio-linguistic lines, can legislate their own official languages, depending on their linguistic demographics. The official languages chosen reflect the predominant as well as politically significant languages spoken in that state. Certain states having a linguistically defined territory may have only the predominant language in that state as its official language, examples being Karnataka and Gujarat, which have Kannada and Gujarati as their sole official language respectively. Telangana, with a sizeable Urdu-speaking Muslim population, and Andhra Pradesh has two languages, Telugu and Urdu, as its official languages.

Some states buck the trend by using minority languages as official languages. Jammu and Kashmir used to have Urdu, which is spoken by fewer than 1% of the population, as the sole official language until 2020. Meghalaya uses English spoken by 0.01% of the population. This phenomenon has turned majority languages into "minority languages" in a functional sense.

In addition to official languages, a few states also designate official scripts.

State	Official language(s)	Additional official language(s)	Mandated scripts
Andhra Pradesh	Telugu	English, Urdu	
Arunachal Pradesh	English		
Assam	Assamese and Bodo	Bengali in three districts of Barak Valley	Bodo is officially written in the Devanagari script.
Bihar	Hindi	Urdu	
Chhattisgarh	Hindi, Chhattisgarhi		Devanagari
Goa	Konkani, English	Marathi	
Gujarat	Gujarati	Hindi	
Haryana	Hindi	English, Punjabi	Hindi should be written in Devanagari. Punjabi should be written in Gurmukhi.
Himachal Pradesh	Hindi	Sanskrit	Both Hindi and Sanskrit are written in Devanagari.
Jharkhand	Hindi	Angika, Bengali, Bhojpuri, Bhumij, Ho, Kharia, Khortha, Kurmali, Kurukh, Magahi, Maithili, Mundari, Nagpuri, Odia, Santali, Urdu	
Karnataka	Kannada	Tulu	
Kerala	Malayalam		
Madhya Pradesh	Hindi		
Maharashtra	Marathi		Devanagari
Manipur	Manipuri	English	Meetei mayek
Meghalaya	English, Khasi and Garo		
Mizoram	Mizo, English		
Nagaland	English		
Odisha	Odia	English	
Punjab	Punjabi		Gurmukhi
Rajasthan	Hindi		
Sikkim	English, Nepali	Bhutia, Gurung, Lepcha, Limbu, Magar, Mukhia, Newari, Rai, Sherpa, and Tamang	
Tamil Nadu	Tamil	English	
Telangana	Telugu	Urdu	
Tripura	Bengali, English, Kokborok		
Uttar Pradesh	Hindi	Urdu	
Uttarakhand	Hindi	Sanskrit	
West Bengal	Bengali, English	Nepali in Darjeeling and Kurseong sub-divisions; Urdu, Hindi, Odia, Santali, Punjabi, Kamtapuri, Rajbanshi, Kudmali/Kurmali, Kurukh and Telugu in blocks, divisions or districts with population greater than 10 per cent	

Union territory	Official language(s)	Additional official language(s)
Andaman and Nicobar Islands	Hindi, English	
Dadra and Nagar Haveli and Daman and Diu	Hindi, English	Gujarati
Delhi	Hindi, English	Urdu, Punjabi
Chandigarh	Hindi, English	
Ladakh	Ladakhi, Purgi, Urdu, Hindi, English	
Lakshadweep	English	Malayalam
Jammu and Kashmir	Kashmiri, Dogri, Hindi, Urdu, English	
Puducherry	Tamil (in Pondicherry and Karaikal), Telugu (in Yanam), Malayalam (in Mahe) (Note: See Official languages of Puducherry)	English, French

In addition to states and union territories, India has autonomous administrative regions which may be permitted to select their own official language – a case in point being the Bodoland Territorial Council in Assam which has declared the Bodo language as official for the region, in addition to Assamese and English already in use. and Bengali in the Barak Valley, as its official languages.

== Prominent languages of India ==
=== Hindi ===
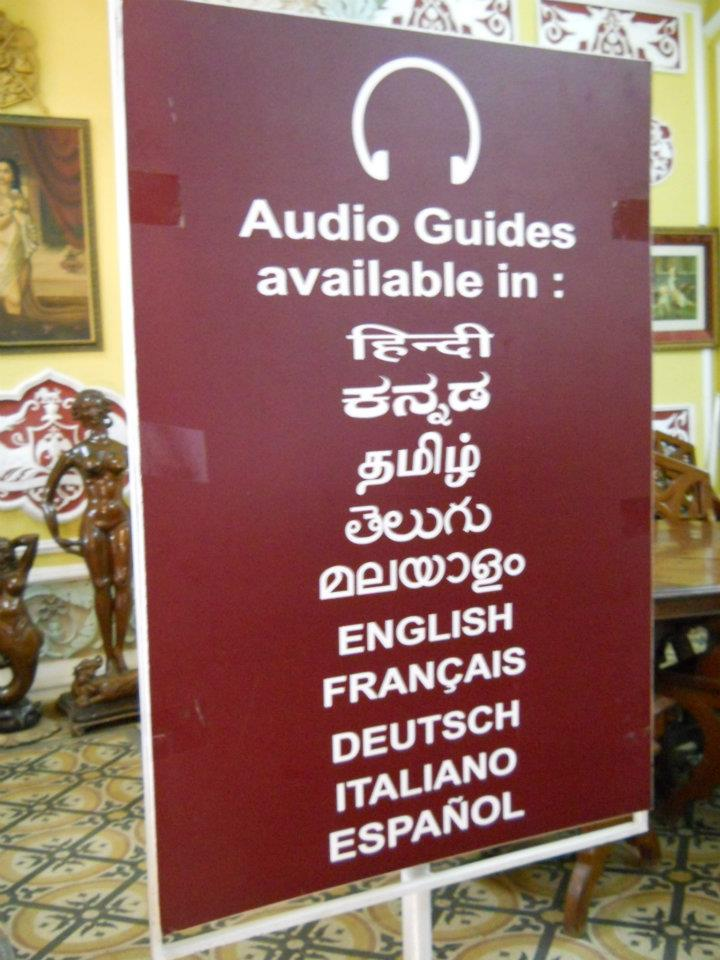
At a tourist site in Bengaluru – Top to bottom, the languages are Hindi, Kannada, Tamil, Telugu, and Malayalam. English and many other European languages are also provided here.

In British India, English was the sole language used for administrative purposes as well as for higher education purposes. When India became independent in 1947, the Indian legislators had the challenge of choosing a language for official communication as well as for communication between different linguistic regions across India. The choices available were:

- Making "Hindi", which a plurality of the country's population (41%) identified as their native language, the sole official language.
- Making English, as preferred by non-Hindi speakers, particularly Kannadigas and Tamils and those from Mizoram and Nagaland, the sole official language.
- Declaring both Hindi and English to be official languages nationwide and giving each state the freedom to choose its own statewide official language(s).

The Indian constitution, in 1950, declared Hindi in Devanagari script to be the official language of the union. Unless Parliament decided otherwise, the use of English for official purposes was to cease 15 years after the constitution came into effect, i.e. on 26 January 1965. The prospect of the changeover, however, led to much alarm in the non-Hindi-speaking areas of India, especially in South India whose native tongues are not related to Hindi. As a result, Parliament enacted the Official Languages Act in 1963, which provided for the continued use of English for official purposes along with Hindi, even after 1965.

=== Bengali ===
Bengali (Bengali: বাংলা) also spelt as Bangla, is the sixth most spoken language in the world. Native to the Bengal region, comprising the nation of Bangladesh and the states of West Bengal, Tripura, Jharkhand and Barak Valley region of Assam. After the partition of India (1947), refugees from East Pakistan were settled in Tripura, West Bengal, Meghalaya, Uttar Pradesh, Chhattisgarh, Madhya Pradesh, and the union territory of Andaman and Nicobar Islands. There is also a large number of Bengali-speaking people in Maharashtra and Gujarat where they work as artisans in jewellery industries. Bengali developed from Abahattha, a derivative of Apabhramsha, itself derived from Magadhi Prakrit. The modern Bengali vocabulary contains the vocabulary base from Magadhi Prakrit and Pali, also borrowings from Sanskrit and other major borrowings from Persian, Arabic, Austroasiatic languages and other languages in contact with.

Like most Indian languages, Bengali has a number of dialects. It exhibits diglossia, with the literary and standard form differing greatly from the colloquial speech of the regions that identify with the language. Bengali language has developed a rich cultural base spanning art, music, literature, and religion. Bengali has some of the oldest literature of all modern Indo-Aryan languages, dating from about 7th to 12th century ('Charyapada' Buddhist songs). There have been many movements in defence of this language and in 1999 UNESCO declared 21 Feb as the International Mother Language Day in commemoration of the Bengali language movement in 1952.

=== Assamese ===
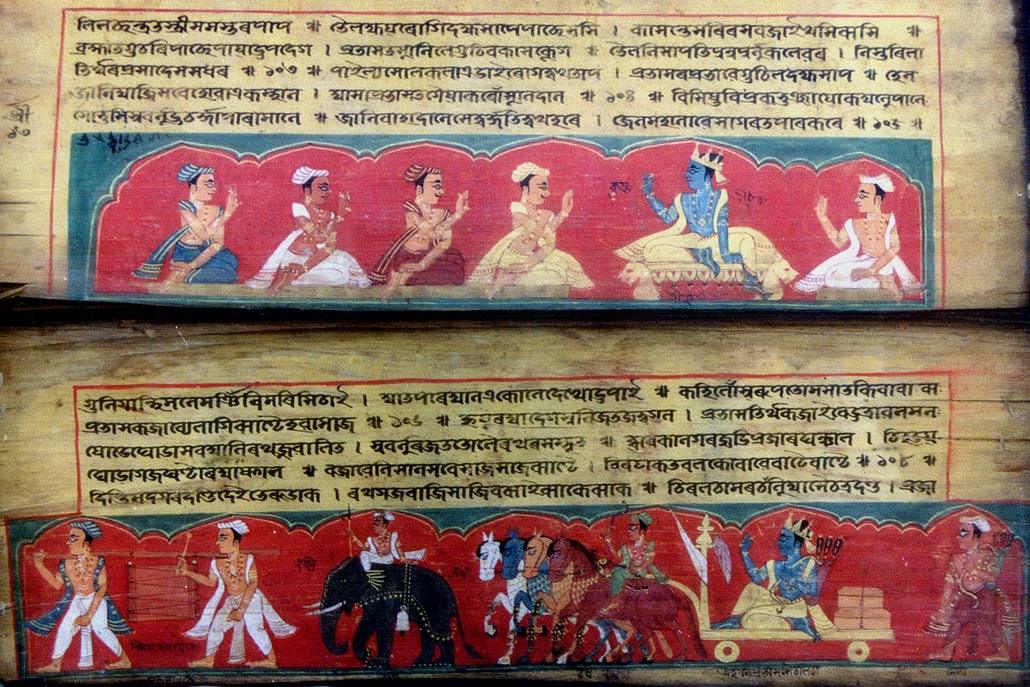
A Bhagavata manuscript written in Early Assamese, from Dakhinpat Satra.

Asamiya or Assamese language is most spoken in the state of Assam. It is an Eastern Indo-Aryan language with more than 23 million total speakers including more than 15 million native speakers and more than 7 million L2 speakers per the 2011 Census of India. Along with other Eastern Indo-Aryan languages, Assamese evolved at least before the 7th century CE from the middle Indo-Aryan Magadhi Prakrit. Assamese is unusual among Eastern Indo-Aryan languages for the presence of the /x/ (which, phonetically, varies between velar ([x]) and a uvular ([χ]) pronunciations). The first characteristics of this language are seen in the Charyapadas composed in between the eighth and twelfth centuries. The first examples emerged in writings of court poets in the fourteenth century, the finest example of which is Madhav Kandali's Saptakanda Ramayana composed during 14th century CE, which was the first translation of the Ramayana into an Indo-Aryan language.

=== Marathi ===
Present-day geographical distribution of Marathi. regions where Marathi is the language of the majority or plurality regions where Marathi is the language of a significant minority

Marathi (Marathi: मराठी, 𑘦𑘨𑘰𑘙𑘲) is an Indo-Aryan language native to the Maharashtra region spoken by the Marathi people & their diaspora around the world. Marathi is the official language of Maharashtra and the co-official language in the union territories of Dadra and Nagar Haveli and Daman and Diu. In Goa, Konkani is the sole official language; however, Marathi may also be used for all official purposes. (Note: The Goa, Daman, and Diu Official Language Act, 1987 makes Konkani the official language, but provides that Marathi may also be used "for all or any of the official purposes". The Government also has a policy of replying in Marathi to correspondence received in Marathi.) There were 83 million speakers of the language in 2011. Marathi has the third-largest number of native speakers in India and ranks 10th in the list of most spoken languages in the world. Marathi has some of the oldest literature of all modern Indo-Aryan languages; the oldest stone inscriptions from the 8th century & literature dating from about 1100 AD (Mukundraj's Vivek Sindhu dates to the 12th century).

The major dialects of Marathi are Standard Marathi (Pramaan Bhasha) and Varhadi. Related languages include Ahirani, Dangi, Vadvali, and Samavedi, while Malvani Konkani has been heavily influenced by Marathi. Descending from Maharashtri Prakrit, the language evolved through Apabhraṃśa stages into Old Marathi. Over a period of many centuries, the Marathi language and people came into contact with diverse linguistic groups. While its foundation lies in Prakrit, Maharashtri, Apabhraṃśa, and Sanskrit, it also integrated elements from Austroasiatic and Dravidian sources. Additionally, Marathi incorporates a significant layer of loanwords from foreign languages, most notably Persian, Arabic, and English, with minor contributions from French and Portuguese.

Marathi Language Day (Marathi: मराठी दिन / मराठी दिवस, romanized: Marathi Dina / Marathi Diwasa) is celebrated on 27 February every year across the Indian states of Maharashtra and Goa, regulated by the State Government. It is celebrated on the birthday of eminent Marathi Poet Vishnu Vaman Shirwadkar, popularly known as Kusumagraj .

=== Meitei ===
Meitei language (officially known as Manipuri language) is the most widely spoken Indian Sino-Tibetan language of Tibeto-Burman linguistic sub branch. It is the sole official language in Manipur and is one of the official languages of India. It is one of the two Sino-Tibetan languages with official status in India, beside Bodo. It has been recognised as one of the advanced modern languages of India by the National Sahitya Academy for its rich literature. It uses both Meitei script as well as Bengali script for writing.

Meitei language is currently proposed to be included in the elite category of "Classical Languages" of India. Besides, it is also currently proposed to be an associate official language of Government of Assam. According to Leishemba Sanajaoba, the present titular king of Manipur and a Rajya Sabha member of Manipur state, by recognising Meitei as an associate official language of Assam, the identity, history, culture and tradition of Manipuris residing in Assam could be protected.

Meitei Language Day (Manipuri Language Day) is celebrated on 20 August every year by the Manipuris across the Indian states of Manipur, Assam and Tripura. This day is regulated by the Government of Manipur. It is the commemoration of the day on which Meitei was included in the Eighth Schedule to the Constitution of India on 20 August 1992.

=== Telugu ===
Telugu is the most widely spoken Dravidian language in India and around the world. Telugu is an official language in Andhra Pradesh, Telangana and Yanam, making it one of the few languages (along with Hindi, Bengali, and Urdu) with official status in more than one state. It is also spoken by a significant number of people in the Andaman and Nicobar Islands, Chhattisgarh, Karnataka, Maharashtra, Odisha, Tamil Nadu, Gujarat, and by the Sri Lankan Gypsy people. It is one of six languages with classical status in India. Telugu ranks fourth by the number of native speakers in India (81 million in the 2011 Census), fifteenth in the Ethnologue list of most-spoken languages worldwide and is the most widely spoken Dravidian language.

=== Tamil ===
15th-century anthology of Tamil religious poetry dedicated to Ganesha

Tamil is a Dravidian language predominantly spoken in Tamil Nadu, Puducherry and many parts of Sri Lanka. It is also spoken by large minorities in the Andaman and Nicobar Islands, Kerala, Karnataka, Andhra Pradesh, Malaysia, Singapore, Mauritius and throughout the world. Tamil ranks fifth by the number of native speakers in India (61 million in the 2001 Census) and ranks 20th in the list of most spoken languages. It is one of the 22 scheduled languages of India and was the first Indian language to be declared a classical language by the Government of India in 2004. Tamil is one of the longest surviving classical languages in the world. It has been described as "the only language of contemporary India which is recognisably continuous with a classical past". The two earliest manuscripts from India, acknowledged and registered by UNESCO Memory of the World register in 1997 and 2005, are in Tamil. Tamil is an official language of Tamil Nadu, Puducherry, Andaman and Nicobar Islands, Sri Lanka and Singapore. It is also recognised as a minority language in Canada, Malaysia, Mauritius and South Africa.

=== Urdu ===
After independence, Modern Standard Urdu, the Persianised register of Hindustani became the national language of Pakistan. During British colonial times, knowledge of Hindustani or Urdu was a must for officials. Hindustani was made the second language of British Indian Empire after English and considered as the language of administration. The British introduced the use of Roman script for Hindustani as well as other languages. Urdu had 70 million speakers in India (per the Census of 2001), and, along with Hindi, is one of the 22 officially recognised regional languages of India and also an official language in the Indian states of Andhra Pradesh, Jammu and Kashmir, Delhi, Uttar Pradesh, Bihar and Telangana that have significant Muslim populations.

=== Gujarati ===
Gujarati is an Indo-Aryan language. It is native to the west Indian region of Gujarat. Gujarati is part of the greater Indo-European language family. Gujarati is descended from Old Gujarati (c. 1100 – 1500 CE), the same source as that of Rajasthani. Gujarati is the chief and official language in the Indian state of Gujarat. It is also an official language in the union territories of Daman and Diu and Dadra and Nagar Haveli. According to the Central Intelligence Agency (CIA), 4.5% of population of India (1.21 billion according to 2011 census) speaks Gujarati. This amounts to 54.6 million speakers in India.

=== Kannada ===
Kannada is a Dravidian language which branched off from Kannada-Tamil sub group around 500 B.C.E according to the Dravidian scholar Zvelebil. It is the official language of Karnataka. According to the Dravidian scholars Steever and Krishnamurthy, the study of Kannada language is usually divided into three linguistic phases: Old (450–1200 CE), Middle (1200–1700 CE) and Modern (1700–present). The earliest written records are from the 5th century, and the earliest available literature in rich manuscript (Kavirajamarga) is from c. 850. Kannada language has the second oldest written tradition of all languages of India. Current estimates of the total number of epigraph present in Karnataka range from 25,000 by the scholar Sheldon Pollock to over 30,000 by the Sahitya Akademi, making Karnataka state "one of the most densely inscribed pieces of real estate in the world". According to Garg and Shipely, more than a thousand notable writers have contributed to the wealth of the language.

=== Malayalam ===
Malayalam has official language status in the state of Kerala and in the union territories of Lakshadweep and Puducherry. It belongs to the Dravidian family of languages and is spoken by some 38 million people. Malayalam is also spoken in the neighbouring states of Tamil Nadu and Karnataka; with some speakers in the Nilgiris, Kanyakumari and Coimbatore districts of Tamil Nadu, and the Dakshina Kannada and the Kodagu district of Karnataka. Malayalam originated from Middle Tamil (Sen-Tamil) in the 7th century. As Malayalam began to freely borrow words as well as the rules of grammar from Sanskrit, the Grantha alphabet was adopted for writing and came to be known as Arya Eluttu. This developed into the modern Malayalam script.

=== Odia ===
Odia (formerly spelled Oriya) is one of the modern languages officially recognised as a classical language from the Indo-Aryan group. Odia is primarily spoken and has official language status in the Indian state of Odisha and has over 40 million speakers. It was declared as a classical language of India in 2014. Native speakers comprise 91.85% of the population in Odisha. Odia originated from Odra Prakrit which developed from Magadhi Prakrit, a language spoken in eastern India over 2,500 years ago. The history of Odia language can be divided to Old Odia (3rd century BC −1200 century AD), Early Middle Odia (1200–1400), Middle Odia (1400–1700), Late Middle Odia (1700–1870) and Modern Odia (1870 until present day). The National Manuscripts Mission of India have found around 213,000 unearthed and preserved manuscripts written in Odia.

=== Santali ===
Santali is a Munda language, a branch of Austroasiatic languages spoken widely in Jharkhand and other states of eastern India by Santhal community of tribal and non-tribal. It is written in Ol Chiki script invented by Raghunath Murmu at the end of 19th century. Santali is spoken by 0.67% of India's population. About 7 million people speak this language. It is also spoken in Bangladesh and Nepal. The language is a major tribal language of Jharkhand and thus the Santhal community is demanding to make it the official language of Jharkhand.

=== Punjabi ===
Punjabi, written in the Gurmukhi script in India, is one of the prominent languages of India with about 32 million speakers. In Pakistan it is spoken by over 80 million people and is written in the Shahmukhi alphabet. It is mainly spoken in Punjab but also in neighbouring areas. It is an official language of Delhi and Punjab.

=== Maithili ===
Maithili is an Indo-Aryan language native to India and Nepal. In India, it is widely spoken in the Bihar and Jharkhand states. Native speakers are also found in other states and union territories of India, most notably in Uttar Pradesh and the National Capital Territory of Delhi. In the 2011 census of India, It was reported by 13,583,464 people as their mother tongue comprising about 1.12% of the total population of India. In Nepal, it is spoken in the eastern Terai, and is the second most prevalent language of Nepal. Tirhuta was formerly the primary script for written Maithili. Less commonly, it was also written in the local variant of Kaithi. Today it is written in the Devanagari script.

In 2003, Maithili was included in the Eighth Schedule of the Indian Constitution as a recognised regional language of India, which allows it to be used in education, government, and other official contexts.

== Classical languages of India ==
In 2004, the Government of India declared that languages that met certain requirements could be accorded the status of a "Classical Language" of India.

Languages thus far declared to be classical:

- Tamil (in 2004),
- Sanskrit (in 2005),
- Kannada (in 2008),
- Telugu (in 2008),
- Malayalam (in 2013),
- Odia (in 2014),
- Assamese (in 2024)
- Bangla (in 2024),
- Marathi (in 2024)
- Pali (in 2024)
- Prakrit (in 2024)

Over the next few years, several languages were granted the Classical status, and demands have been made for other languages, including Maithili and Meitei (officially called Manipuri).

== Other regional languages and dialects ==
The 2001 census identified the following native languages having more than one million speakers. Most of them are dialects/variants grouped under Hindi.

Languages	No. of native speakers
Bhojpuri	33,099,497
Rajasthani	18,355,613
Magadhi/Magahi	13,978,565
Chhattisgarhi	13,260,186
Haryanvi	7,997,192
Marwari	7,936,183
Malvi	5,565,167
Mewari	5,091,697
Khorth/Khotta	4,725,927
Bundeli	3,072,147
Bagheli	2,865,011
Pahari	2,832,825
Laman/Lambadi	2,707,562
Awadhi	2,529,308
Harauti	2,462,867
Garhwali	2,267,314
Nimadi	2,148,146
Sadan/Sadri	2,044,776
Kumauni	2,003,783
Dhundhari	1,871,130
Tulu	1,722,768
Surgujia	1,458,533
Bagri Rajasthani	1,434,123
Banjari	1,259,821
Nagpuria	1,242,586
Surjapuri	1,217,019
Kangri	1,122,843

=== Practical problems ===
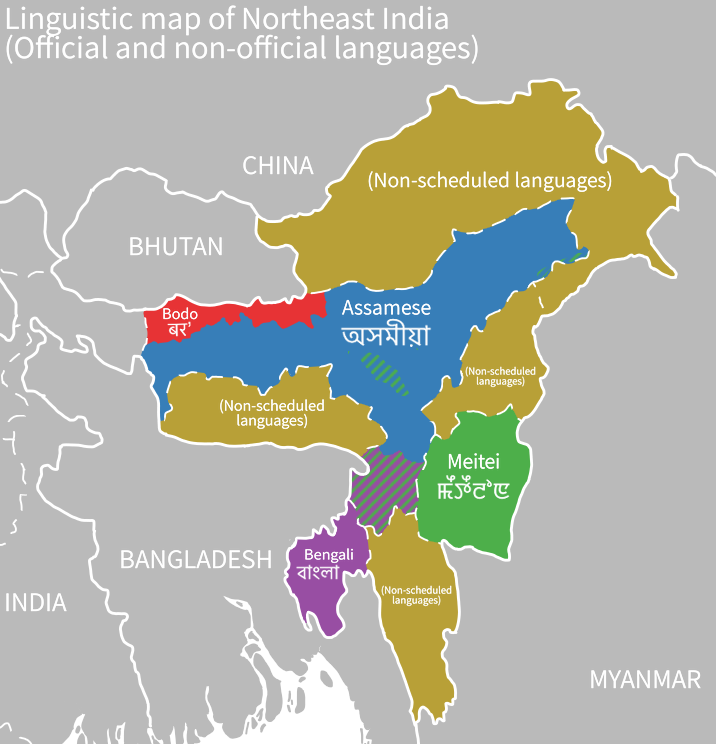
"Scheduled" and "non-scheduled" official languages of Northeast Indian states; most of the languages in Northeast are unrecognised by the Eighth Schedule to the Constitution of India

India has several languages in use; choosing any single language as an official language presents problems to all those whose "mother tongue" is different. However, all the boards of education across India recognise the need for training people to one common language. There are complaints that in North India, non-Hindi speakers have language trouble. Similarly, there are complaints that North Indians have to undergo difficulties on account of language when travelling to South India. It is common to hear of incidents that result due to friction between those who strongly believe in the chosen official language, and those who follow the thought that the chosen language(s) do not take into account everyone's preferences. Local official language commissions have been established and various steps are being taken in a direction to reduce tensions and friction.

== Languages by earliest known inscriptions ==
Earliest known manuscripts are often subjected to debates and disputes, due to the conflicting opinions and assumptions of different scholars, claiming high antiquity of the languages. So, inscriptions are studied more in depth for understanding the chronology of the oldest known languages of the Indian subcontinent.

Date	Language	Earliest known inscriptions	Images	Notes
15th century BCE	Vedic Sanskrit	Vedic Sanskrit loanwords and names of Vedic gods found in inscriptions/texts of the Mitanni Empire	Cuneiform tablet containing a letter from Tushratta of Mitanni to Amenhotep III (of 13 letters of King Tushratta). British Museum	See: Indo-Aryan superstrate in Mitanni
3rd century BCE	Sanskrit/Prakrit	Sanskrit loanwords in Greek/Aramaic/Prakrit inscriptions of Aśoka.		See: Edicts of Ashoka
early 2nd century BC	Old Tamil	rock inscription ARE 465/1906 at Mangulam caves, Tamil Nadu (Other authors give dates from late 3rd century BC to 1st century AD.)	2nd century BCE Tamil Brahmi inscription Arittapatti, Madurai, India	
1st century BC	Sanskrit	Ayodhya Inscription of Dhana, and Hathibada Ghosundi inscriptions (both near Chittorgarh)	Dhanadeva Ayodhya inscription	The Junagadh rock inscription of Rudradaman (shortly after 150 AD) is the oldest long text.
c. 450	Old Kannada	Halmidi inscription	Halmidi inscription	
c. 568 CE	Meitei	Yumbanlol copper plate inscriptions about literature of sexuality, the relationships between husbands and wives, and instructions on how to run a household.	Yumbanlol copper plate inscriptions	
c. 575 CE	Telugu	Kalamalla inscription		
c. 849/850 CE	Malayalam	Quilon Syrian copper plates	Quilon Syrian copper plates plates	
c. 950 CE	Maithili	Sahodara inscription	Sahodara stone inscription	
c. 1012 CE	Marathi	A stone inscription from Akshi taluka of Raigad district		
c. 1051 CE	Odia	Urajam inscription	Odia - Urajam inscription	

== Language policy ==
The Union Government of India formulated the Three-language formula.

=== In the Prime Minister's Office ===
The official website of the Prime Minister's Office of India publishes its official information in 11 Indian official languages, namely Assamese, Bengali, Gujarati, Kannada, Malayalam, Meitei (Manipuri), Marathi, Odia, Punjabi, Tamil and Telugu, out of the 22 official languages of the Indian Republic, in addition to English and Hindi.

=== In the Press Information Bureau ===
The Press Information Bureau (PIB) selects 14 Indian official languages, which are Dogri, Punjabi, Bengali, Odia, Gujarati, Marathi, Meitei (Manipuri), Tamil, Kannada, Telugu, Malayalam, Konkani and Urdu, in addition to Hindi and English, out of the 22 official languages of the Indian Republic to render its information about all the Central Government press releases. (Note: The Meitei language (officially called Manipuri) versions of the press releases are presently available in Bengali script, but there is plan of changing the script into Meitei script (Manipuri script) in due course of time.)

=== In the Staff Selection Commission ===
The Staff Selection Commission (SSC) selected 13 Indian official languages, which are Urdu, Tamil, Malayalam, Telugu, Kannada, Assamese, Bengali, Gujarati, Konkani, Meitei (Manipuri), Marathi, Odia and Punjabi, in addition to Hindi and English, out of the 22 official languages of the Indian Republic, to conduct the Multi-Tasking (Non-Technical) Staff examination for the first time in its history.

=== In the Central Armed Police Forces ===
The Union Government of India selected Assamese, Bengali, Gujarati, Marathi, Malayalam, Meitei (Manipuri), Kannada, Tamil, Telugu, Odia, Urdu, Punjabi, and Konkani, 13 out of the 22 official languages of the Indian Republic, in addition to Hindi & English, to be used in the recruitment examination of the Central Armed Police Forces (CAPF). The decision was taken by the Home Minister after having an agreement between the Ministry of Home Affairs and the Staff Selection Commission. The official decision will be converted into action from 1 January 2024; 2 years ago.

== Language conflicts ==
There are conflicts over linguistic rights in India. The first major linguistic conflict, known as the Anti-Hindi agitations of Tamil Nadu, took place in Tamil Nadu against the implementation of Hindi as the official language of India. Political analysts consider this as a major factor in bringing DMK to power and leading to the ousting and nearly total elimination of the Congress party in Tamil Nadu. Strong cultural pride based on language is also found in other Indian states such as Assam, Odisha, Karnataka, West Bengal, Punjab and Maharashtra. To express disapproval of the imposition of Hindi on its states' people as a result of the central government, the government of Maharashtra made the state language Marathi mandatory in educational institutions of CBSE and ICSE through Class/Grade 10.

The Government of India attempts to assuage these conflicts with various campaigns, coordinated by the Central Institute of Indian Languages, Mysore, a branch of the Department of Higher Education, Language Bureau, and the Ministry of Human Resource Development.

== Linguistic movements ==
In the history of India, various linguistic movements were and are undertaken by different literary, political and social associations as well as organisations, advocating for the changes and the developments of several languages, dialects and vernaculars in diverse critical, discriminative and unfavorable circumstances and situations.

=== Bengali ===
- Bengali language movement in India

=== Bhojpuri ===
The Bhojpuri language movement, a linguistic movement that has been actively campaigning for greater recognition of the Bhojpuri language since 1947.

There have been several protests and demands to include the Bhojpuri language in the Eighth Schedule of the Indian Constitution for a long time. In 1971, CPI MP Bhogendra Jha introduced a bill on this issue in the Lok Sabha, but it was rejected.

In 2009 and 2016, Yogi Adityanath, the Chief Minister of Uttar Pradesh and former MP from Gorakhpur, raised the issue of Bhojpuri's recognition in the Lok Sabha. He emphasised that Bhojpuri, spoken in parts of India and 27 countries, is one of the world's major languages.

=== Meitei (Manipuri) ===
- Meitei language movements (aka Manipuri language movements), various linguistic movements for the cause of Meitei language (officially called Manipuri language)
  - Meitei linguistic purism movement, an ongoing linguistic movement, aimed to attain linguistic purism in Meitei language
  - Scheduled language movement, a historical linguistic movement in Northeast India, aimed at the recognition of Meitei language as one of the scheduled languages of Indian Republic
  - Meitei classical language movement, an ongoing linguistic movement in Northeast India, aimed at the recognition of Meitei language as an officially recognised "classical language"
  - Meitei associate official language movement, a semi active linguistic movement in Northeast India, aimed at the recognition of Meitei language as an "associate" official language of Assam

=== Rajasthani ===
- Rajasthani language movement, a linguistic movement that has been campaigning for greater recognition for the Rajasthani language since 1947

=== Tamil ===
- Tanittamil Iyakkam (Pure Tamil Movement), a linguistic purism movement for the Tamil language, to ignore the loanwords borrowed from Sanskrit

== Developmental works ==
In the age of technological advancements, the Google Translate supports the following Indian languages: Bengali, Bhojpuri, Gujarati, Hindi, Kannada, Maithili, Malayalam, Marathi, Meiteilon (Manipuri) (Note: Google Translate mentions both "Meiteilon" as well as "Manipuri" (within the parentheses) at the same time for the Meitei language (officially known as Manipuri language).) (in Meitei script (Note: Meitei language uses both Meitei script as well as Bengali script officially but Google Translate uses Meitei script only.)), Odia, Punjabi (in Gurmukhi script (Note: Punjabi language uses both Gurmukhi script as well as Shahmukhi script officially but Google Translate uses Gurmukhi script only.)), Santali (Ol Chiki script), Sanskrit, Tamil, Telugu, Urdu.

=== Meitei (Manipuri) ===
On 4 September 2013, the Directorate of Language Planning and Implementation (DLPI) was established for the development and the promotion of Meitei language (officially called Manipuri language) and the Meitei script (Manipuri script) in Manipur.

The Manipuri Sahitya Parishad is given annual financial support of ₹500,000 (equivalent to ₹820,000 or US$8,800 in 2026) by the Government of Manipur.

Since 2020, the Government of Assam is giving annual financial support of ₹500,000 (equivalent to ₹640,000 or US$6,900 in 2026) to the Assam Manipuri Sahitya Parishad. Besides, the Assam government financed ₹6 crore (equivalent to ₹7.7 crore or US$820,000 in 2026) for the creation of a corpus for the development of the Meitei language (officially called Manipuri language).

In September 2021, the Central Government of India released ₹180 million (US$1.9 million) as the first instalment for the development and the promotion of the Meitei language (officially called Manipuri language) and the Meitei script (Manipuri script) in Manipur.

The Department of Language Planning and Implementation of the Government of Manipur offers a sum of ₹5,000 (equivalent to ₹9,300 or US$99 in 2026), to every individual who learns Meitei language (officially called Manipuri language), having certain terms and conditions.

=== Sanskrit ===
The Central Government of India allocated ₹6438.4 million in the last three years for the development and the promotion of Sanskrit, ₹2311.5 million in 2019–20, around ₹2143.8 million in 2018–19, and ₹1983.1 million in 2017–18.

=== Tamil ===
The Central Government of India gave an allocation of Rs 105.9 million in 2017–18, Rs 46.5 million in 2018–19 and Rs 77 million in 2019–20 to the "Central Institute of Classical Tamil" for the development and the promotion of Tamil language.

=== Telugu and Kannada ===
The Central Government of India gave an allocation of Rs 10 million in 2017–18, Rs 9.9 million in 2018–19 and Rs 10.7 million in 2019–20, each for the development and the promotion of Telugu language and Kannada language.

== Computerisation ==
Multi-pair translations
Language	Language code	Google Translate	Bhashini	Microsoft Translator	Yandex Translate	IBM Watson	DeepL
Assamese	as	Yes	Yes	Yes	No	No	Yes
Awadhi	awa	Yes	Yes	No	No	No	No
Bengali	bn	Yes	Yes	Yes	Yes	Yes	Yes
Bhojpuri	bho	Yes	Yes	Yes	No	No	Yes
Bodo	brx	No	Yes	Yes	No	No	No
Braj	bra	No	Yes	No	No	No	No
Chhattisgarhi	hne	No	No	Yes	No	No	No
Dogri	doi	No	Yes	Yes	No	No	No
Gondi	gon	No	Yes	No	No	No	No
Gujarati	gu	Yes	Yes	Yes	Yes	Yes	Yes
Hindi	hi	Yes	Yes	Yes	Yes	Yes	Yes
Ho	hoc	No	Yes	No	No	No	No
Kangri	xnr	No	Yes	No	No	No	No
Kannada	kn	Yes	Yes	Yes	Yes	Yes	No
Kashmiri	ks	No	Yes	Yes	No	No	No
Khasi	kha	Yes	Yes	No	No	No	No
Kokborok	trp	Yes	No	No	No	No	No
Konkani	kok	Yes	Yes	Yes	No	No	Yes
Magahi	mag	No	Yes	No	No	No	No
Maithili	mai	Yes	Yes	Yes	No	No	Yes
Malayalam	ml	Yes	Yes	Yes	Yes	Yes	Yes
Marathi	mr	Yes	Yes	Yes	Yes	Yes	Yes
Marwari	mwr	Yes	No	Yes	No	No	No
Meitei (Manipuri)	mni (script specific: mni-Mtei)	Yes	Yes	Yes	No	No	No
Mizo	lus	Yes	Yes	No	No	No	No
Nepali	ne	Yes	Yes	Yes	Yes	Yes	Yes
Odia (Oriya)	or	Yes	Yes	Yes	No	No	No
Punjabi	pa	Yes	Yes	Yes	Yes	Yes	Yes
Sanskrit	sa	Yes	Yes	Yes	No	No	Yes
Santali	sat	Yes	Yes	No	No	No	No
Sindhi	sd	Yes	Yes	Yes	No	No	No
Tamil	ta	Yes	Yes	Yes	Yes	Yes	Yes
Telugu	te	Yes	Yes	Yes	Yes	Yes	Yes
Tulu	tcy	Yes	Yes	No	No	No	No
Urdu	ur	Yes	Yes	Yes	Yes	Yes	Yes

== Writing systems ==
Most languages in India are written in scripts derived from Brahmi. These include Devanagari, Tamil, Telugu, Kannada, Meitei Mayek, Odia, Eastern Nagari – Assamese/Bengali, Gurumukhi and other. Urdu is written in a script derived from Arabic. A few minor languages such as Santali use independent scripts (see Ol Chiki script).

Various Indian languages have their own scripts. Hindi, Marathi, Maithili and Angika are languages written using the Devanagari script. Most major languages are written using a script specific to them, such as Assamese (Asamiya) with Asamiya, Bengali with Bengali, Punjabi with Gurmukhi, Meitei with Meitei Mayek, Odia with Odia script, Gujarati with Gujarati; Awadhi, Magahi and Bhojpuri with Kaithi script etc. Urdu and Kashmiri, Saraiki and Sindhi are written in modified versions of the Perso-Arabic script. With this one exception, the scripts of Indian languages are native to India. Some languages like Kodava that didn't have a script, as well as some languages such as Tulu which already had a script, adopted the Kannada script due to its readily available printing settings.

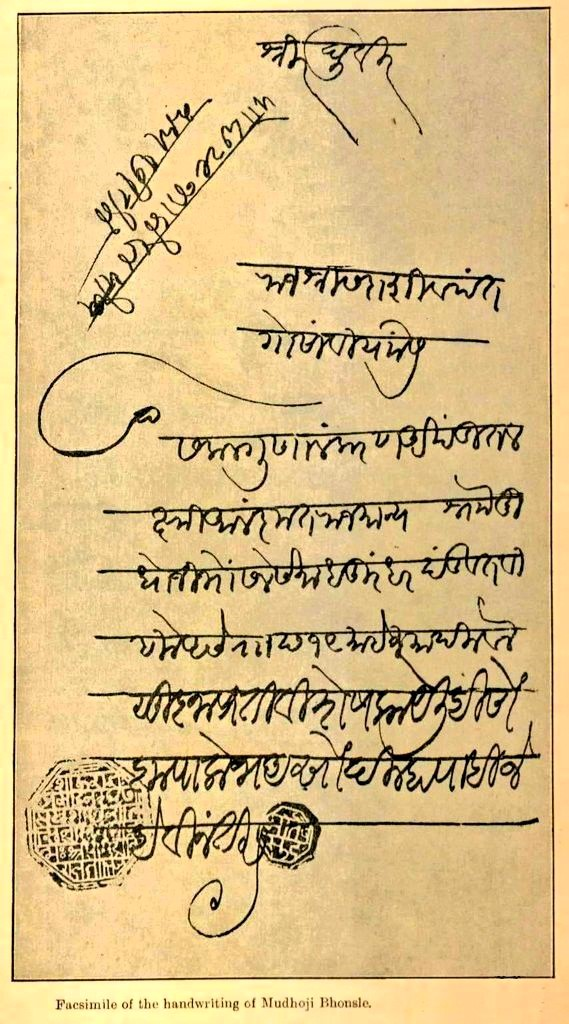
Seal, signature and handwriting of Maratha Senadhurandar Mudhoji Bhonsle I of Chandrapur and Nagpur. This text is written in Modi script which was used as an alternative script for Marathi.

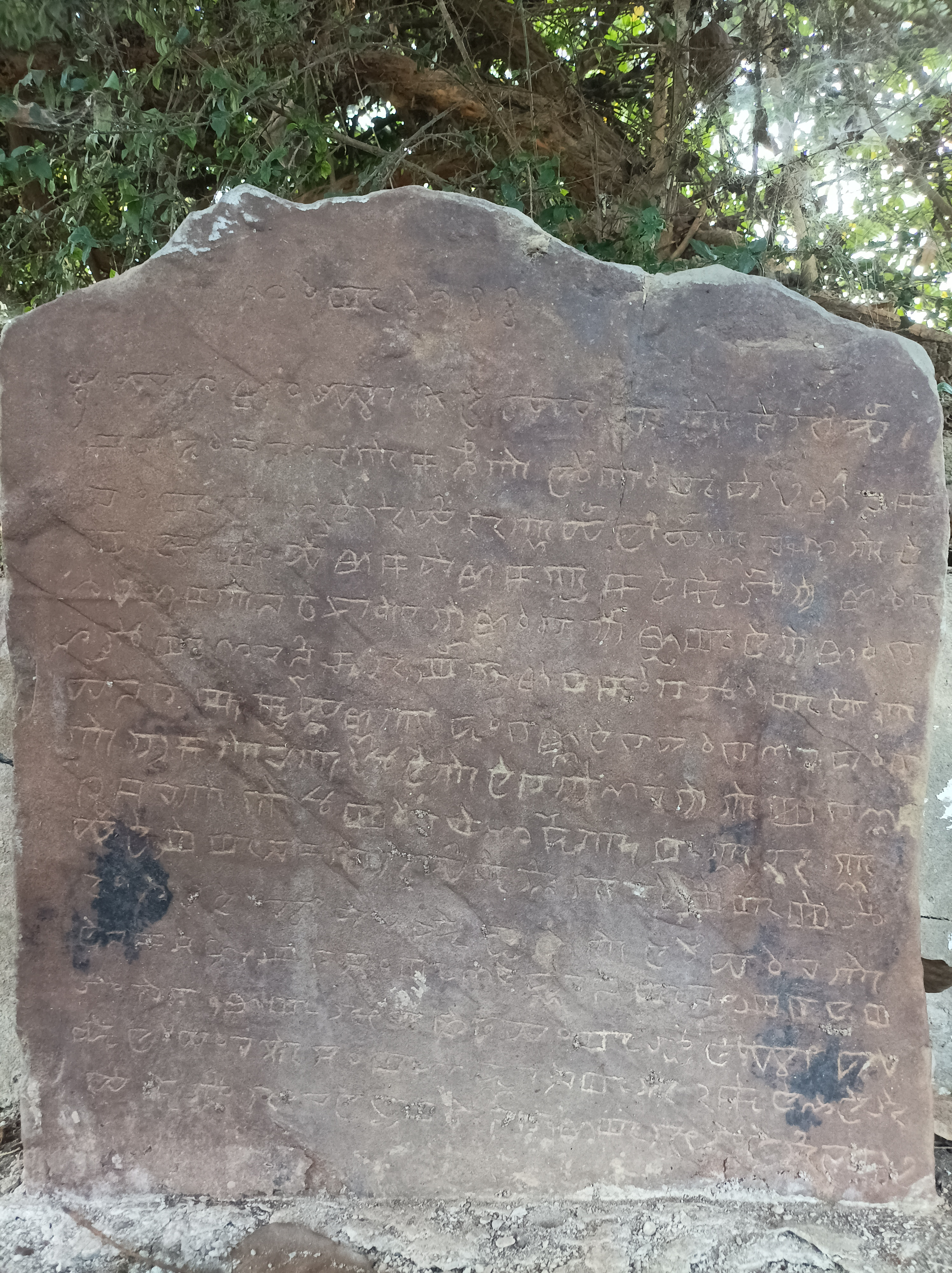
A Meitei language stone inscription in Meitei script about a royal decree of a Meitei king found in the sacred site of God Panam Ningthou in Andro, Imphal East, Manipur

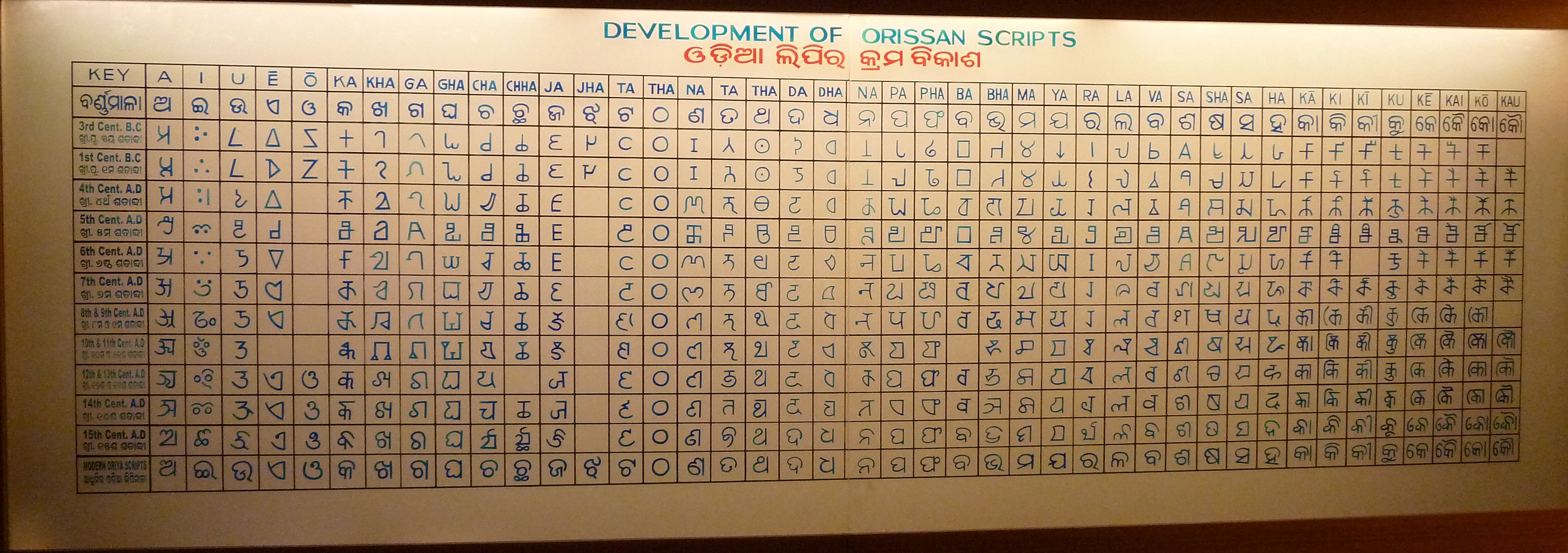
Development of Odia script

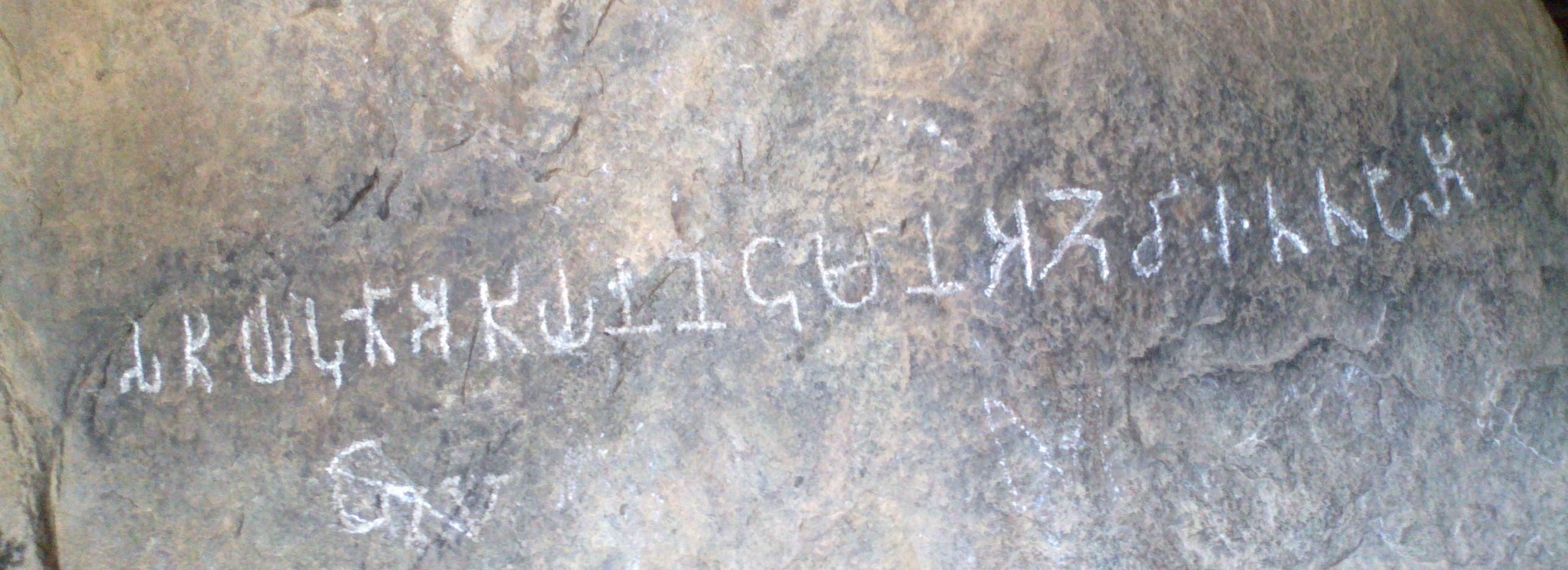
Tamil-Brahmi inscription in Jambaimalai

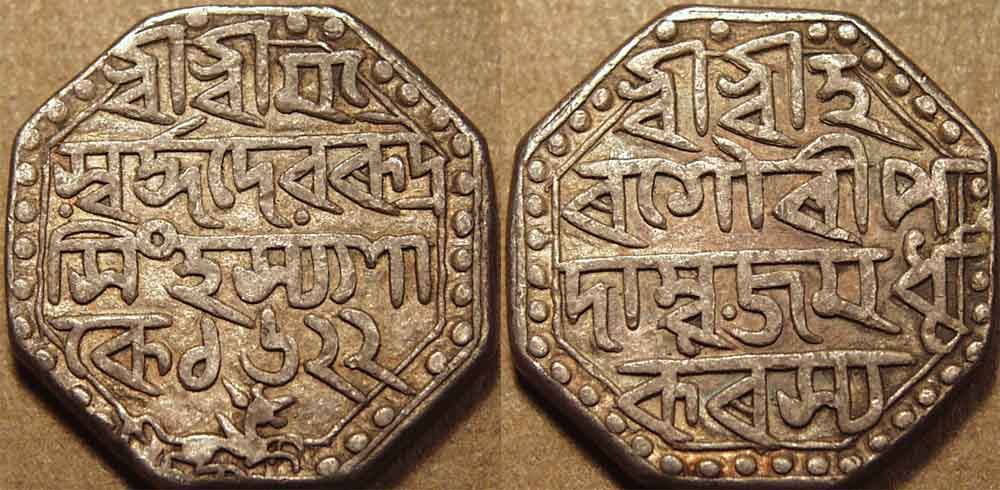
Silver coin issued during the reign of Rudra Singha with Assamese inscriptions

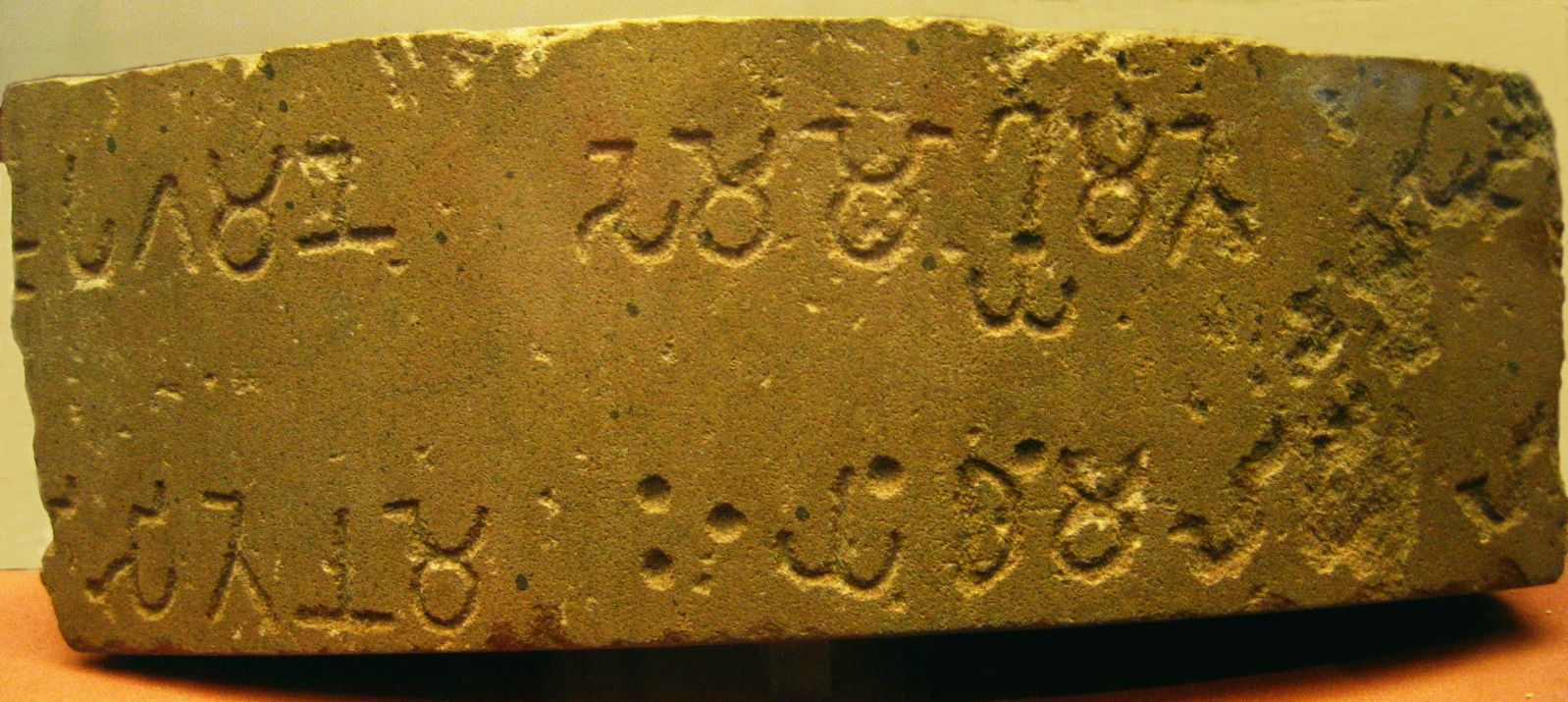
North Indian Brahmi found in Ashok pillar

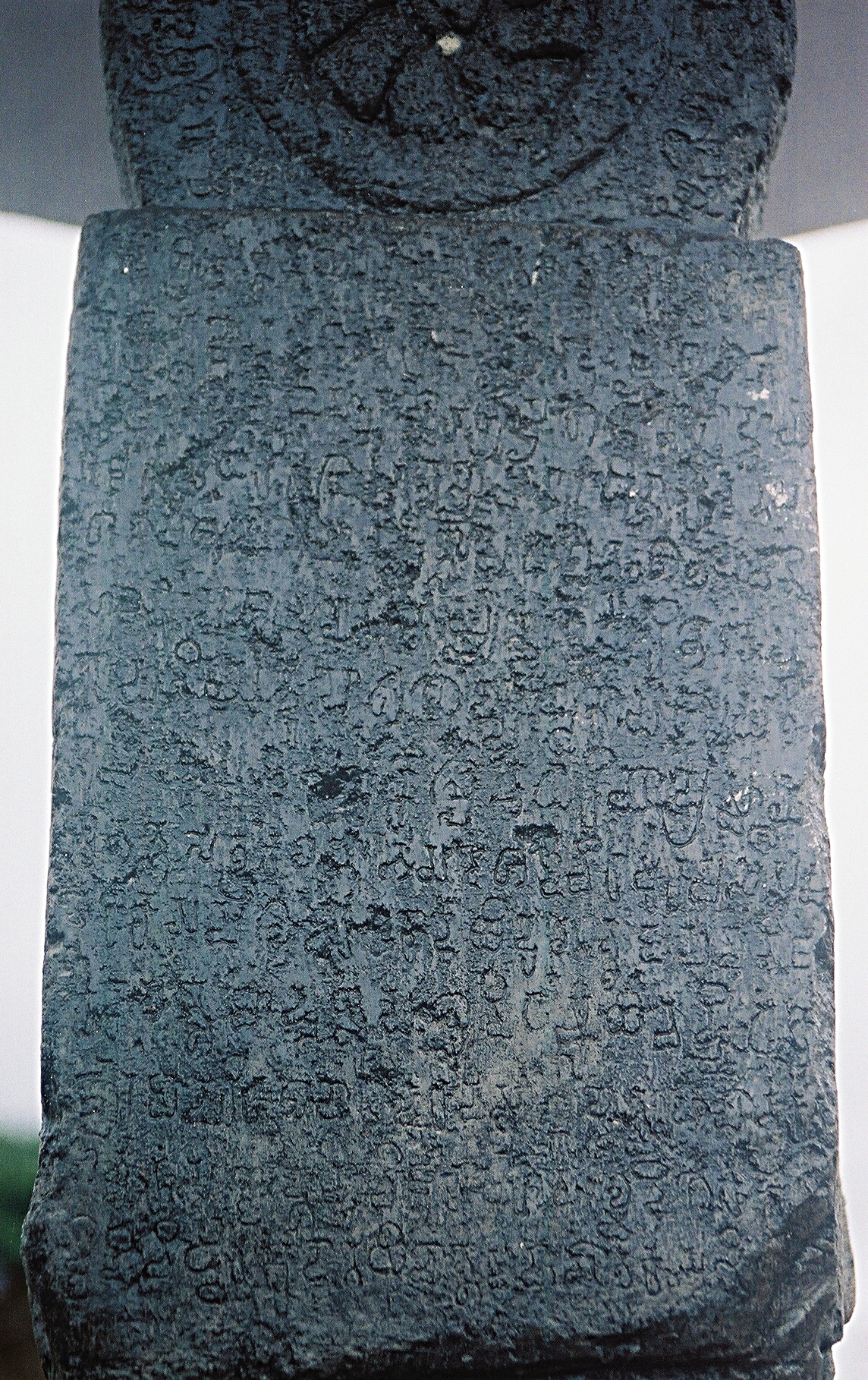
The Halmidi inscription, the oldest known inscription in the Kannada script and language. The inscription is dated to the 450 CE - 500 CE period.

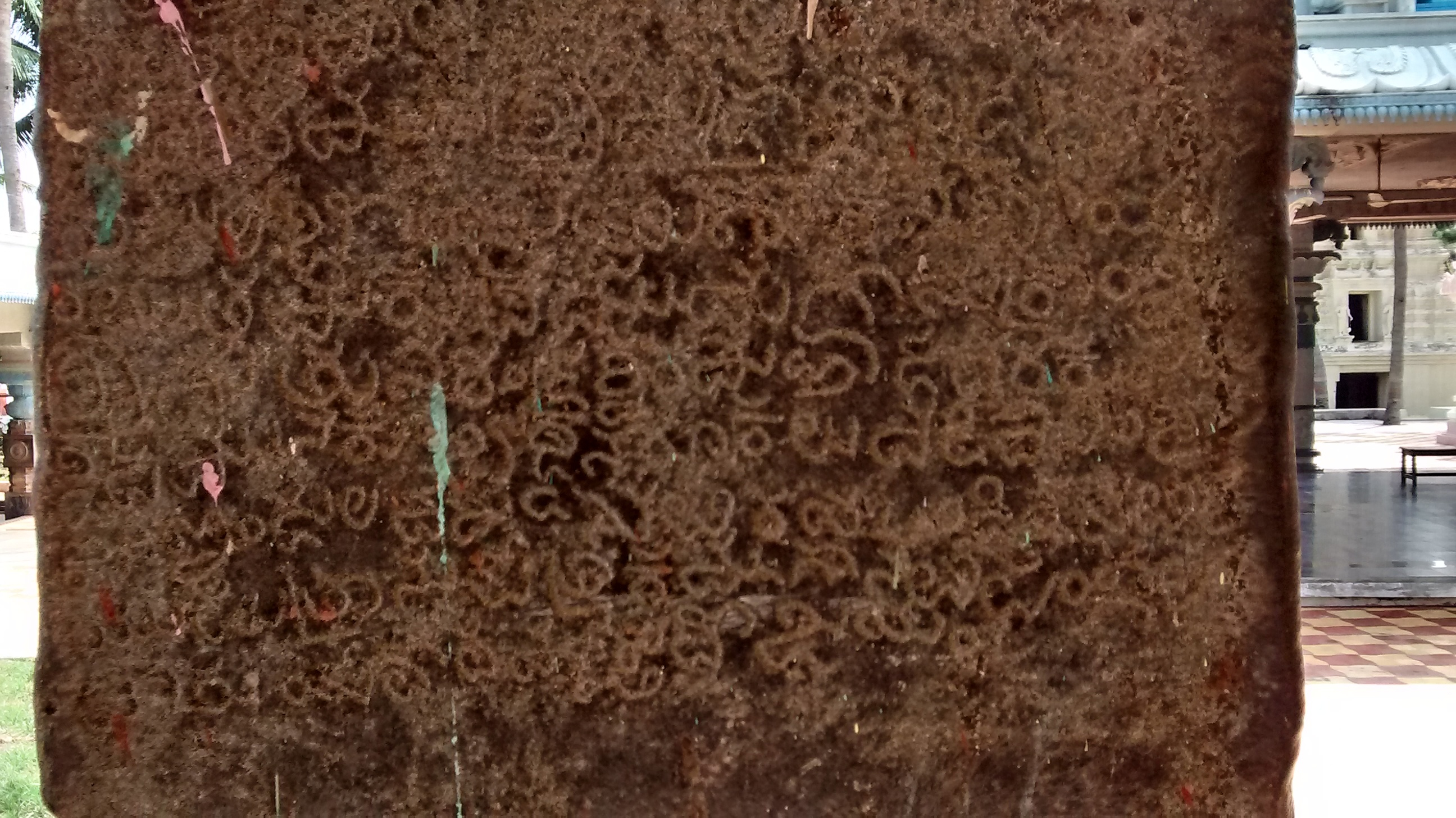
An early Telugu inscription found in the Krishna district of Andhra Pradesh

== Sample text ==
The following is a sample text of Article 1 of the Universal Declaration of Human Rights (by the United Nations) in various languages of India and in their associated writing scripts. Names of Scheduled Languages are in bold.

Article 1: All human beings are born free and equal in dignity and rights. They are endowed with reason and conscience and should act towards one another in a spirit of brotherhood.

Article 1 of the Universal Declaration of Human Rights
Language	Script	Sample text	References
Angika (Note: Angika is attested to have had its own script called Anga lipi in the Buddhist Texts, but has since been lost.)	Devanagari (अंगिका) (Official)	सब्भे मनुष्प के गौरव आरू आधिकार रॉ संदर्भ मं जन्मजात स्वतंत्रता व समानता प्राप्त छै । हुनका सब के अंतरात्मा रॉ देन प्राप्त छै आरू हुनका परस्पर बंधुता रॉ भाव सं स्वाभाव करना चाहियॉ ।	
Angika	Kaithi (𑂃𑂑𑂹𑂏𑂱𑂍𑂰) (Historical)	𑂮𑂥𑂹𑂦𑂵 𑂧𑂢𑂳𑂭𑂹𑂣 𑂍𑂵 𑂏𑂸𑂩𑂫 𑂄𑂩𑂴 𑂄𑂡𑂱𑂍𑂰𑂩 𑂩𑂰 𑂮𑂁𑂠𑂩𑂹𑂦 𑂧𑂁 𑂔𑂢𑂹𑂧𑂔𑂰𑂞 𑂮𑂹𑂫𑂞𑂁𑂞𑂹𑂩𑂞𑂰 𑂫 𑂮𑂧𑂰𑂢𑂞𑂰 𑂣𑂹𑂩𑂰𑂣𑂹𑂞 𑂓𑂶 𑃀 𑂯𑂳𑂢𑂍𑂰 𑂮𑂥 𑂍𑂵 𑂃𑂁𑂞𑂩𑂰𑂞𑂹𑂧𑂰 𑂩𑂰 𑂠𑂵𑂢 𑂣𑂹𑂩𑂰𑂣𑂹𑂞 𑂓𑂶 𑂄𑂩𑂴 𑂯𑂳𑂢𑂍𑂰 𑂣𑂩𑂮𑂹𑂣𑂩 𑂥𑂁𑂡𑂳𑂞𑂰 𑂩𑂰 𑂦𑂰𑂫 𑂮𑂁 𑂮𑂹𑂫𑂰𑂦𑂰𑂫 𑂍𑂩𑂢𑂰 𑂒𑂰𑂯𑂱𑂨𑂰 𑃀	
Ao	Latin script	Ocet 1. Meimchir ajak temeten aser tashi kasa nüji nung asor. Parnok dak bilemtettsü shisatsü aser tangatetba kasa agüja aliba jagi külem adianu rongnung tanela ka nung lungjema alitsüla.	
Awadhi	Devanagari (अवधी)	अनुच्छेद १ - सब मनइन कां गउरव औ अधिकारन के मामिला मां जनमजात आजादी औ बरोबरी मिली बा। वन्हैं बुद्धी औ अन्तरात्मा कै देन मिली बा औ आपस मां यक दुसरे के साथे भाईचारा के भाव से बरताव करै कां चाही।	
**Assamese**	Asamiya (অসমীয়া)	১ম অনুচ্ছেদ: জন্মগতভাৱে সকলো মানুহ মৰ্য্যদা আৰু অধিকাৰত সমান আৰু স্বতন্ত্ৰ। তেওঁলোকৰ বিবেক আছে, বুদ্ধি আছে। তেওঁলোকে প্ৰত্যেকে প্ৰত্যেকক ভ্ৰাতৃভাৱে ব্যৱহাৰ কৰা উচিত।	
**Bengali**	Bangla Lipi (বাংলা)	ধারা ১: সমস্ত মানুষ স্বাধীনভাবে সমান মর্যাদা এবং অধিকার নিয়ে জন্মগ্রহণ করে। তাঁদের বিবেক এবং বুদ্ধি আছে; সুতরাং সকলেরই একে অপরের প্রতি শ্রাতৃত্বসুলভ মনোভাব নিয়ে আচরণ করা উচিৎ।	
Bhojpuri	Kaithi (𑂦𑂷𑂔𑂣𑂳𑂩𑂲) (Traditional)	𑂃𑂢𑂳𑂒𑂹𑂓𑂵𑂠 १: 𑂮𑂥𑂯𑂱 𑂪𑂷𑂍𑂰𑂢𑂱 𑂄𑂔𑂰𑂠𑂵 𑂔𑂢𑂹𑂧𑂵𑂪𑂰 𑂄𑂇𑂩 𑂋𑂎𑂱𑂢𑂱𑂨𑂷 𑂍𑂵 𑂥𑂩𑂰𑂥𑂩 𑂮𑂧𑂹𑂧𑂰𑂢 𑂄𑂋𑂩 𑂃𑂡𑂱𑂍𑂰𑂩 𑂣𑂹𑂩𑂰𑂣𑂹𑂞 𑂯𑂫𑂵 𑃀 𑂋𑂎𑂱𑂢𑂱𑂨𑂷 𑂍𑂵 𑂣𑂰𑂮 𑂮𑂧𑂕-𑂥𑂴𑂕 𑂄𑂇𑂩 𑂃𑂢𑂹𑂞:𑂍𑂩𑂝 𑂍𑂵 𑂄𑂫𑂰𑂔 𑂯𑂷𑂎𑂞𑂰 𑂄𑂋𑂩 𑂯𑂳𑂢𑂍𑂷 𑂍𑂵 𑂠𑂷𑂮𑂩𑂰 𑂍𑂵 𑂮𑂰𑂟 𑂦𑂰𑂆𑂒𑂰𑂩𑂵 𑂍𑂵 𑂥𑂵𑂫𑂯𑂰𑂩 𑂍𑂩𑂵 𑂍𑂵 𑂯𑂷𑂎𑂪𑂰 𑃁	
**Bodo**	Devanagari (बरʼ राव) (Official)	गासै सुबुं आनो उदांयै मान सनमान आरो मोनथाय लाना जोनोम लायो। बिसोरो मोजां- गाज्रि सान्नो हानाय गोहो आरो सोलो दं। बिसोरो गावखौनो गाव बिदा फंबाय बायदि बाहाय लायनांगौ।	
**Bodo**	Latin script (Boro Rao) (Former)	Gaswi subung anw udangwi man sanman arw mwnthai lana jwnwm layw. Biswrw mwjang-gajri sannw hanai gwhw arw swlw dong. Biswrw gaokhwunw gao bida phongbai baidi bahai lainangwu.	
Chakma	Chakma Ajhapat (𑄌𑄋𑄴𑄟𑄳𑄦 𑄞𑄌𑄴)	𑄝𑄬𑄉𑄴 𑄟𑄚𑄪𑄥𑄴𑄥𑄪𑄚𑄴 𑄥𑄴𑄤𑄙𑄩𑄚𑄴 𑄉𑄧𑄢𑄨 𑄃𑄬𑄇𑄴𑄇𑄧𑄃𑄨 𑄟𑄧𑄢𑄴𑄡𑄘 𑄃𑄢𑄴 𑄃𑄧𑄙𑄨𑄇𑄢𑄴 𑄣𑄧𑄚𑄬 𑄣𑄰 𑄎𑄧𑄚𑄴𑄟𑄧 𑄃𑄧𑄚𑄴𑅁 𑄖𑄢𑄢𑄴 𑄝𑄨𑄝𑄬𑄇𑄴 𑄝𑄪𑄘𑄴𑄙𑄨 𑄝𑄬𑄇𑄴𑄇𑄚𑄨 𑄃𑄉𑄬, 𑄥𑄬𑄚𑄧𑄖𑄴𑄖𑄬 𑄃𑄟𑄢𑄴 𑄝𑄬𑄇𑄴𑄇𑄪𑄚𑄬𑄣𑄴𑄣𑄬𑄃𑄨 𑄘𑄮𑄣𑄴 𑄌𑄨𑄖𑄴𑄖𑄧𑄣𑄰 𑄥𑄧𑄁𑄛𑄧𑄢𑄕 𑄃𑄪𑄌𑄨𑄖𑄴𑅂	
Chhattisgarhi	Devanagari (छत्तीसगढ़ी) (Official)	अनुच्छेद १. सबो लोगन मन के गौरव अऊ अधिकार मन के मामला म जनम ले मिले स्वतंत्रता अऊ बरोबरी मिले हे। ओमन ल बुद्धि अऊ अन्तरात्मा के देन मिले हे अऊ ओमन ल एक दूसर ल परेम भाईचारा के भाव ले बेवहार करना चाही।	
**Dogri**	Dogra Akkhar (𑠖𑠵𑠌𑠤𑠮)	𑠩𑠬𑠤𑠳 𑠢𑠝𑠯𑠊𑠹𑠋 𑠢𑠴𑠪𑠹𑠢𑠬 𑠙𑠳 𑠀𑠜𑠭𑠊𑠬𑠤𑠳𑠷 𑠛𑠳 𑠠𑠭𑠧𑠳 𑠏 𑠑𑠝𑠢𑠴 𑠚𑠢𑠬𑠷 𑠩𑠯𑠙𑠴𑠷𑠙𑠤 𑠙𑠳 𑠠𑠤𑠵𑠠𑠤 𑠝। 𑠄'𑠝𑠳𑠷𑠌𑠮 𑠠𑠯𑠛𑠹𑠜𑠮 𑠙𑠳 𑠑𑠢𑠮𑠤𑠴 𑠛𑠮 𑠛𑠳𑠝 𑠚𑠹𑠪𑠵𑠃 𑠇 𑠙𑠳 𑠄'𑠝𑠳𑠷𑠌𑠮 𑠁𑠞𑠰𑠷-𑠠𑠭𑠏𑠹𑠏𑠳𑠷 𑠡𑠬𑠃𑠏𑠬𑠤𑠳 𑠛𑠳 𑠡𑠬𑠦𑠴 𑠊𑠝𑠹𑠝𑠴 𑠠𑠹𑠣𑠪𑠬𑠤 𑠊𑠤𑠝𑠬 𑠥𑠵𑠫𑠛𑠬 𑠇।	
Gondi	Devanagari (गोण्डि) (Northern Gondi)	लाईन १ (उण्डी): सब् माने कुन् गौरव् अरु अधिकार् ना मांला ते जनंजात् सुतन्तर्ता अरु बराबर् ता हक् पुट्ताल। अवेन् भायि लेह्का माने मासि बेव्हार् कियाना आन्द।	
Gondi	Telugu Lipi (గోణ్డి) (Southern Gondi)	లాఈన ౧ (ఉణ్డీ): సబ్ మానే కున్ గౌరవ్ అరు అధికార్ నా మాంలా తే జనంజాత్ సుతంతర్తా అరు బరాబర్ తా హక్ పుట్తాల. అవేన్ భాయి లేహ్కా మానే మాసి బేవ్హార్ కియానా ఆంద.	
Gondi	Gunjala Gondi (𑵶𑶓𑶕𑶂𑶋) (Adilabad Gondi)	𑵵𑶊𑵣𑵺 𑶡 (𑵤𑵺𑶗𑶂𑶌): 𑶉𑵮𑶐 𑵰𑶊𑵺𑶗𑵭𑶊𑵵𑶍𑶈𑶗𑵱 𑶅𑶍𑵽𑶗𑵽𑵺𑶄𑶗𑵶𑶐 𑶉𑶍𑵽 𑵰𑶍𑵺𑶗𑵺𑶐 𑶅𑶊𑵭𑶋𑵳𑶐 𑵥𑵺𑵸 𑵠𑵸𑶋𑵱𑶊𑶈𑵳𑶐 𑵱𑵳 𑶉𑶊𑵽𑶌 𑵺𑶋𑵱𑶗𑵱𑶍𑶈𑶗𑵱 𑵰𑵺𑶗𑵳𑶓𑶈𑶗𑵱. 𑵪𑶈𑶍𑵺 𑵭𑶋𑵮𑶐𑵱 𑵮𑶍𑵺 𑵰𑶍𑵺𑶗𑵺𑶐 𑵰𑵺𑵸 𑵶𑶗𑵬𑶊𑵺 𑵰𑵺𑶗𑵳𑶊, 𑵪𑶈𑶍 𑵳𑵰𑶗𑵰𑶍𑶈𑵺𑶊 𑵺𑵳𑶐𑵳𑶐 𑵪𑶈𑶓𑵺 𑵪𑶈𑶓𑶈 𑵱𑵳 𑵭𑶋𑵮𑶐𑵱𑵳𑶐 𑵺𑶂𑵱𑶋𑵭𑶊𑶈 𑵰𑵺𑶗𑵳𑶓𑶈𑶗𑵱.	
Gondi	Masiram Gondi (𑴎𑴽𑵀𑴘𑴳) (Officially adopted in Maharashtra)	𑴧𑴱𑴃𑴟 𑵑 (𑴄𑴚𑵅𑴘𑴳): 𑴫𑴢𑵄 𑴤𑴱𑴟𑴺 𑴌𑴴𑴟𑵄 𑴎𑴿𑴦𑴨𑵄 𑴀𑴦𑴴 𑴀𑴞𑴲𑴌𑴱𑴦𑵄 𑴟𑴱 𑴤𑴱𑵀𑴧𑴱 𑴛𑴺 𑴓𑴟𑵀𑴓𑴱𑴛𑵄 𑴫𑴴𑴛𑴟𑵅𑴛𑵆𑴛𑴱 𑴀𑴦𑴴 𑴢𑴦𑴱𑴢𑴦𑵄 𑴛𑴱 𑴬𑴌𑵄 𑴠𑴴𑴖𑵅𑴛𑴱𑴧। 𑴀𑴨𑴺𑴟𑵄 𑴣𑴱𑴥𑴲 𑴧𑴺𑴬𑵅𑴌𑴱 𑴤𑴱𑴟𑴺 𑴤𑴱𑴫𑴲 𑴢𑴺𑴨𑵅𑴬𑴱𑴦𑵄 𑴌𑴲𑴥𑴱𑴟𑴱 𑴁𑴟𑵅𑴝।	
**Gujarati**	Gujarati Lipi (ગુજરાતી)	અનુચ્છદ ૧ઃ તમામ મનુષ્યો જન્મથી સ્વતંત્ર છે અને પ્રતિષ્ઠા તેમજ અધિકારોની બાબતમાં સમાન છે. તેઓ બુદ્ધિ અને અંતઃકરણ ધરાવે છે અને તેમણે પરસ્પર બંધુત્વની ભાવનાથી વર્તવું જોઈએ.	
**Hindi** (Note: Hindi is a Sanskritised standard register of the Hindustani language, mutually intelligible with Urdu.)	Devanagari (हिन्दी)	अनुच्छेद १. सभी मनुष्य जन्म से स्वतन्त्र तथा मर्यादा और अधिकारों में समान होते हैं। वे तर्क और विवेक से सम्पन्न हैं तथा उन्हें भ्रातृत्व की भावना से परस्पर के प्रति कार्य करना चाहिए।	
Ho	Warang Citi (Note: Ho is written in a multitude of scripts like Devanagari, Latin and Odia, although native speakers are said to prefer Warang Citi.) (𑢹𑣉𑣉 𑣎𑣋𑣜)	𑣞𑣃𑣓𑣃𑣄 (𑣁𑣓𑣃𑣏‍𑣏‍𑣙𑣈𑣔𑣉) 1 - 𑣞𑣗𑣂𑣓 𑣖𑣁𑣓𑣖𑣂 𑣌𑣉𑣁𑣄 𑣙𑣂𑣅𑣁𑣕𑣂𑣊 𑣁𑣓𑣑𑣉𑣄 𑣈𑣌𑣕𑣂𑣅𑣜 𑣌𑣉 𑣜𑣈𑣅𑣄 𑣖𑣁𑣖𑣚𑣈 𑣜𑣈 𑣎𑣉𑣓𑣉𑣖𑣈𑣈 𑣕𑣈𑣋𑣈 𑣔𑣁𑣖𑣃𑣚 𑣁𑣓𑣑𑣉𑣄 𑣗𑣜𑣁𑣗𑣜𑣂 𑣜𑣈𑣅𑣄 𑣓𑣖𑣁 𑣌𑣓𑣁 . 𑣂𑣓𑣂𑣌𑣃 𑣗𑣃𑣔𑣔𑣂 𑣁𑣓𑣑𑣉: 𑣎𑣂𑣗𑣉𑣓 𑣗𑣂𑣕𑣜 𑣜𑣈𑣅𑣄 𑣈𑣓𑣈𑣖 𑣓𑣖𑣁 𑣌𑣓𑣁 𑣁𑣓𑣑𑣉: 𑣁𑣌𑣉-𑣁𑣌𑣉 𑣜𑣈 𑣙𑣋𑣈𑣅𑣁- 𑣗𑣉𑣙𑣅𑣁 (𑣗𑣁𑣆𑣏𑣁𑣜𑣈) 𑣜𑣈𑣅𑣄 𑣎𑣂𑣗𑣉𑣓 𑣃𑣑𑣃𑣄 𑣕𑣈𑣌𑣉 𑣎𑣁𑣓𑣁𑣋𑣜 𑣕𑣈𑣅𑣄 𑣔𑣉𑣜𑣌𑣜.	
**Kannada**	Kannada Lipi (ಕನ್ನಡ)	ನಿಬಂಧ್ನೆ - ೧. ಎಲ್ಲಾ ಮಾನವರು ಸ್ವತಂತ್ರರಾಗಿ ಹುಟ್ಟಿದ್ದಾರೆ ಹಾಗೂ ಘನತೆ ಮತ್ತು ಅಧಿಕಾರಗಳಲ್ಲಿ ಸಮಾನರಾಗಿದ್ದಾರೆ. ತಿಳಿವು ಮತ್ತು ಅಂತಃಸಾಕ್ಷಿಯನ್ನು ಹೊಂದಿದವರಾದ್ದರಿಂದ, ಅವರು ಒಬ್ಬರಿಗೊಬ್ಬರು ಸಹೋದರ ಭಾವದಿಂದ ನಡೆದುಕೊಳ್ಳಬೇಕು.	
**Kashmiri**	Perso-Arabic script in Nastaliq calligraphy style ( کٲشُر) (Official)	دَفعہ ۱۔ سٲری اِنسان چھِ آزاد زامٕتؠ۔ وؠقار تہٕ حۆقوٗق چھِ ہِوی۔ تِمَن چھُ سوچ سَمٕج عَطا کَرنہٕ آمُت تہٕ تِمَن پَزِ بٲے بَرادٔری ہٕنٛدِس جَذباتَس تَحَت اَکھ أکِس اَکار بَکار یُن ۔	
**Kashmiri**	Sharada (𑆑𑆳𑆯𑆶𑆫𑇀) (Ancient / liturgical)	𑆱𑆳𑆫𑆵 𑆅𑆤𑇀𑆱𑆳𑆤𑇀 𑆗𑆴 𑆄𑆘𑆳𑆢𑇀 𑆘𑆳𑆩𑆠𑇀𑆪𑇀 𑇅 𑆮𑇀𑆪𑆑𑆳𑆫𑇀 𑆠 𑆲𑆾𑆑𑆷𑆑𑇀 𑆗𑆴 𑆲𑆴𑆮𑆵𑇅 𑆠𑆴𑆩𑆤𑇀 𑆗𑆶 𑆱𑆾𑆖𑇀 𑆱𑆩𑆘𑇀 𑆃𑆠𑆳 𑆑𑆫𑇀𑆤 𑆄𑆩𑆶𑆠𑇀 𑆠 𑆠𑆴𑆩𑆤𑇀 𑆥𑆘𑆴 𑆧𑆳𑆪𑇀 𑆧𑆫𑆳𑆢𑆫𑆵 𑆲𑆤𑇀𑆢𑆴𑆱 𑆘𑆘𑆧𑆳𑆠𑆱𑇀 𑆠𑆲𑆠𑇀 𑆃𑆒𑇀 𑆃𑆑𑆴𑆱𑇀 𑆃𑆑𑆳𑆫𑇀 𑆧𑆑𑆳𑆫𑇀 𑆪𑆶𑆤𑇀।	
Khasi	Khasi alphabet (Ka Ktien Khasi)	**Jinis 1. Ïa** ki bynriew baroh la kha laitluid bad ki ïaryngkat ha ka burom bad ki hok. Ha ki la bsiap da ka bor pyrkhat bad ka jingïatiplem bad ha ka mynsiem jingsngew shipara, ki dei ban ïatrei bynrap lang.	
Kokborok (Note: Kokborok has an original script known as Koloma which is supposedly lost. The script of Kokborok is a politically charged issue within Tripura. See also: Script issues of Kokborok.)	Bengali Lipi (ককবরক)	বেবাক বুরোক নাঙলাই বোরোক তেই মানথাই বাই ফুয়োকজাকৗই অছাইঅ। বʼরʼক সিমুঙ তেই রৗঙমুঙনি হামারি বাই কুপলুঙ তেই বৗতা বুফেয়ুঙ কৗথামুঙনি উানসুকমুঙ বাই খরোকসা তেই খোরোকসানো ছুবালাইনা নাঙগো।	
Kokborok	Latin script (Kokborok)	Bebak borok nanglai borom tei manthai baih phiyokjakgwi achaio. Bohrok simung tei rwngmungni hamari baih kuplung tei bwta-buphayung kwthamungni wansukmung baih khoroksa tei khoroksano chubalaina nango.	
**Konkani** (Note: Konkani has no universal script. See also: Konkani alphabets)	Devanagari (Note: Because Devanagari is the official script used to write Konkani in Goa and Maharashtra, most Konkanis (especially Hindus) in those two states write the language in Devanagari.) (कोंकणी) (Official in Goa)	सगळे मनीस जल्माक येवन मुक्त आनी स्वाभिमान आनी हक्कांनी समान आसतात. तांणी तर्क आनी विवेकान युक्त आसून तांणी एकामेकां कडेन भावपणाच्या भावनांनी वागचें।	
**Konkani**	Romi (Note: Konkani is widely written in the Roman script (called Romi Konkani) especially by Goan Catholics. See also: Konkani in the Roman script) (Konknni) (Traditional & court mandated in Goa)	Sogle monis jolmtonam svotontr asat ani tankam soman protisth ani odhikar asat. Tankam somoz ani vivek favo jala ani tamni ekmekakodde bhavponnachea mogachea bhavnen vagchem.	
**Konkani**	Kannada Lipi (Note: The Konkani community settled in Canara Coast, Karnataka, use the Kannada script.) (ಕೊಂಕಣಿ) (Regional)	ಸಗ್ಳೆ ಮನಿಸ್ ಜಲ್ಮತನಾ ಸ್ವತಂತ್ರ ಆಸಾತ್ ಆನಿ ತಾಂಕಾಂ ಸಮಾನ ಪ್ರತಿಷ್ಠಾ ಆನಿ ಅಧಿಕಾರ್ ಆಸಾತ್. ತಾಂಕಾಂ ಸಮಜ್ ಆನಿ ವಿವೇಕ್ ಫಾವೊ ಜಾಲಾ ಆನಿ ತಾಣಿಂ ಎಕ್ಮೆಕಾಕಡೆ ಭಾವಪಣಾಚ್ಯಾ ಮೊಗಾಚ್ಯಾ ಭಾವನೇನ್ ವಾಗ್ಚೆಂ.	
**Konkani**	Malayalam Lipi (Note: The Konkani community settled in Mattancherry, Kerala, use the Malayalam script. See also: Gaud Saraswat Brahmin) (കൊങ്കണി) (Regional)	സഗ്ളെ മനീസ് ജല്മതനാ സ്വതന്ത്ര ആസാത് ആനീ താങ്കാം സമാന പ്രതിഷ്ഠാ ആനീ അധികാര് ആസാത്. താങ്കാം സമജ് ആനീ വിവേക് ഫാവോ ജാലാ ആനീ താണീം എക്മേകാകടേ ഭാവപണാച്യാ മൊഗാച്യാ ഭാവനേൻ വാഗ്ചേം.	
**Konkani**	Perso-Arabic script (Note: Konkani Muslims use Perso-arabic script to write Konkani.) (کونکنی) (Community)	سگلے منیس جلتمنا سوتنترا آسات آنی تانکا سمان پرتشتھا آنی ادھکار آسات. تانکا سمج آنی ووک فاوو جالا آنی تانی ایکمیکاکڑے بھاوپناچیا موگاچیا بھاونین واگچی.	
Kolami	Devanagari (कॊलामि) (Northwestern Kolami)	ऎल् मन्ककॆर् स्वातन्त्र्यमड् पुट्टॆन्दन् वन्नॆर्। मरि समानं मरि अधिकारङ्कुळन् समानम् अण्डर्। अवर् तर्कङ्कुळ् मरि विवेकंलड् सम्पन्नं मरि ऒक्कॊरिक्कॊवॆण्ट बन्धूत्वंलॆ भावनालड् आडन् पाजे॥	
Kolami	Telugu Lipi (కొలామి) (Naiki / Southeastern Kolami)	ఎల్ మన్కకెర్ స్వాతంత్ర్యమనడ్ పుట్టెందన్ వన్నెర్. మరి సమానం మరి అధికారంకుళన్ సమానం అండర్. అవర్ తర్కంకుళ్ మరి వివేకంలడ్ సంపన్నం మరి ఒక్కొరిక్కొవెంట బంధూత్వంలె భావనాలడ్ ఆడన్ పాజే.	
Kullui (Note: Kullu is a variety of Western Pahari language.)	Takri (𑚊𑚰𑚥𑚷𑚱𑚃)	𑚜𑚭𑚤𑚭 𑛁 (𑚀𑚂𑚝 𑚕𑚮𑚢𑚭) - 𑚜𑚭𑚤𑚭 𑛁 (𑚀𑚂𑚝 𑚕𑚮𑚢𑚭) 𑚨𑚠𑚳 𑚦𑚶𑚣𑚊𑚶𑚙𑚮𑚩𑚤𑚰 𑚞𑚶𑚤𑚙𑚮𑚋𑚶𑚕𑚭 𑚤 𑚀𑚜𑚮𑚊𑚭𑚤𑚊𑚴 𑚁𑚜𑚭𑚤𑚢𑚭 𑚑𑚝𑚶𑚢𑚑𑚭𑚙 𑚨𑚶𑚦𑚙𑚝𑚶𑚙𑚶𑚤 𑚤 𑚨𑚢𑚭𑚝 𑚩𑚰𑚝𑚶𑚐𑚝𑚶 । 𑚄𑚝𑚯𑚩𑚤𑚰 𑚠𑚰𑚛𑚶𑚜𑚮 𑚤 𑚦𑚮𑚦𑚲𑚊 𑚥𑚮𑚆𑚤 𑚁𑚆𑚊𑚭 𑚩𑚰𑚝𑚶𑚐𑚝𑚶 𑚤 𑚆𑚊 𑚀𑚤𑚶𑚊𑚭𑚞𑚶𑚤𑚙𑚮 𑚡𑚭𑚙𑚶𑚤𑚮𑚙𑚶𑚦𑚊𑚴 𑚦𑚶𑚣𑚦𑚩𑚭𑚤 𑚌𑚤𑚮𑚝𑚰𑚞𑚤𑚶𑚐 ।	
Kurukh	Tolong Siki (Note: This script has official status in Jharkhand.) (𑷊𑶲̃𑷗𑶲𑷖)	𑷕𑶳𑷐𑶺𑶵 𑶵𑷑𑶵𑷐𑶰𑶿 𑷕𑶴𑷊 𑷌𑶴𑷕𑶰 𑶸𑶵𑷐𑶱 𑶿𑶲 𑶺𑶴𑷑𑷑𑶰𑶿𑶻𑶵 𑶴𑷗𑶵𑷂𑶰 𑶴𑷐𑶵 𑶴𑷓𑷀𑶱𑶺 𑶺𑶴𑶿𑶿𑶵 𑷌𑶴𑷕𑶰 𑷕𑶴𑶻 𑷖𑶴𑷋𑶴𑷐𑷊𑶰 𑷐𑶴𑶰. 𑶵𑷐𑶰𑶿 𑷑𑶲𑷐 𑶴𑷐𑶵 𑷇𑶰𑷏𑶵 𑷌𑶴𑷕𑶰 𑷂𑶴𑶽 𑶸𑶴𑶲𑷔𑶵 𑷖𑶴𑷋𑶴𑷊𑶰𑷙 𑷐𑶴𑶰𑷙 𑶴𑷐𑶵 𑶻𑶲𑶺𑷕𑶱𑷙𑷓 𑶺𑶴𑷈𑶰 𑶿𑶲𑷙 𑶺𑶱𑷑-𑶶̰𑶱𑶺 𑷌𑶴𑷕𑶰 𑶸𑶱𑶽𑷕𑶵𑷐 𑶿𑶴𑶿𑶿𑶵 𑷅𑶴𑷕𑶰𑷙.	
Kurukh	Devanagari (Note: The most common script used to write Kurukh.) (कुँड़ुख़)	होरमा आलारिन हक गहि बारे नू मल्लीन्ता अज़ादी अरा आण्टेम मन्ना गही हक़ ख़खरकी रई। आरिन लूर अरा जिया गही दव बउसा ख़खकी रई अरा तम्हैं मझी नू मेल-प्रेम गही बेवहार ननना चही।	
Ladakhi	Choskat (ལ་དྭགས་སྐད)	འགྲོ་བ་མིའི་རིགས་རྒྱུད་ཡོངས་ལ་སྐྱེས་ཙམ་ཉིད་ནས་ཆེ་མཐོངས་དང༌། ཐོབ་ཐངགི་རང་དབང་འདྲ་མཉམ་དུ་ཡོད་ལ། ཁོང་ཚོར་རང་བྱུང་གི་བློ་རྩལ་དང་བསམ་ཚུལ་བཟང་པོ་འདོན་པའི་འོས་བབས་ཀྱང་ཡོད། དེ་བཞིན་ཕན་ཚུན་གཅིག་གིས་གཅིག་ལ་བུ་སྤུན་གྱི་འདུ་ཤེས་འཛིན་པའི་བྱ་སྤྱོད་ཀྱང་ལག་ལེན་བསྟར་དགོས་པ་ཡིན༎	(Note: As Ladakhi is primarily a spoken language, written documents often use standard Tibetan script to communicate formal, standardized phrases like the UDHR, but differs in pronunciation being more closer to Classical Tibetan)
Lepcha	Róng (ᰛᰩᰵᰛᰧᰵᰶ)	ᰠᰕᰆᰪ ᰍᰬᰊ: ᰠᰕᰆᰪ-ᰍᰬᰊ ᰀᰪᰃᰧᰊ ᰎᰦᰆᰎᰛᰌᰨᰅ, ᰣᰦᰓᰪᰣᰦᰕᰨᰊ, ᰣᰦᰈᰤᰀ, ᰠᰅᰃᰤᰨ ᰃᰬᰍᰎᰍ ᰣᰰ ᰠᰕᰠᰕᰆᰨ ᰜᰤᰦᰅᰌᰬ ᰣᰰ ᰕᰎᰬᰜᰟᰪ ᰏᰤᰨᰍᰰ ᰍᰪᰛ, ᰣᰧᰊ ᰣᰍ ᰠᰈᰨᰅᰌᰨᱏᰨᰈᰨᰅ ᰠᰤᰪᰋᰨ ᰠᰪᰈᰨᰅᰌᰨ ᰋᰨ ᰕᰪᰌᰪᰀᰕᰪᰌᰪᰀ ᰣᰦᰓᰥᰬᰊ ᰕᰃᰦᰊ ᰀᰦᰊ ᰍᰰ ᰀᰦᰊ ᰠᰕᰤᰪᰛᰬᰕ ᰣᰦᰛᰬ ᰇᰤᰨᰛᰧᰶᰀᰦ ᰎᰧᰋᰨ ᰋᰨᰅᰎᰨᰅᰠᰦ ᰋᰨᰅ ᰍᰧᰠᰧᰶᰕᰣᰨ ᰻ ᰣᰦᰛᰬᰓᰬᰀ ᰃᰬᰍᰎᰍ, ᰜᰤᰦᰅ ᰋᰨᰀᰦ ᰣᰦᰎᰧᰶᰍ ᰣᰦᰟᰨᰍ ᰜᰤᰦᰅ ᰌᰬᰎ ᰝᰦᰌᰨ ᰠᰮᰕᰪ ᰠᰛᰬᰌᰨ ᰋᰨ, ᰆᰰᱏᰧᰀ ᰈᰤᰫᰅᰕᰃᰦᰊ ᰣᰰ ᰜᰤᰦᰅ ᰈᰤᰫᰅᰠᰦ ᰈᰤᰫᰅ ᰜᰤᰦᰅ ᰜᰧᰈᰨᰅ ᰠᰳᰌᰨᰜᰦ ᰋᰨᰀᰦ ᰣᰦᰓᰥᰬᰊ ᰕᰈᰪᰀᰕᰣᰨ ᰻	
Limbu	Sirijanga (ᤕᤠᤰᤌᤢᤱ ᤐᤠᤴ)	ᤁᤢᤎᤠ ᥇: ᤁᤧᤖᤧᤰ ᤕᤠᤵᤔᤡᤜᤠ᤹ ᤀᤡᤱᤎᤠᤱ ᤏᤢ ᤕᤢᤰᤖᤧ ᤏᤠ᤺ᤶᤓᤣᤀᤠᤣ ᤛᤠᤘᤠ᤺ᤴᤏᤠᤣᤏᤢᤀᤣ ᤆᤠᤣ᤺ᤰᤕᤢᤶᤓᤠᤣᤒᤠ ᤏᤢ ᤐᤧᤶᤒᤧᤶᤒᤠ ᤔᤧᤘᤠ᤹ ॥ ᤂᤢᤏᤡ᤹ ᤏᤡᤛᤡ᤺ᤰᤐᤠ ᤏᤢ ᤂᤧᤛᤡᤱ ᤔᤧᤍᤠᤖᤢᤀᤠᤱ ᤔᤧᤍᤩᤧᤀᤠᤱ ᤔᤧᤘᤠ᤹ ᤜᤧᤰᤁᤩᤠᤱ ᤌᤡᤰᤘᤣ᤹ᤀᤠᤣ ᤑᤢ᤹ᤏᤢᤛᤠ᤹ ᤀᤡᤛᤡᤰ ᤀᤠᤣᤃᤠᤵ ᤆᤠᤣ᤺ᤰᤔᤠᤛᤡ ᤐᤠᤣ᤺ᤱ ॥	
Magahi	Kaithi (𑂧𑂏𑂯𑂲) (Traditional)	𑂃𑂢𑂳𑂒𑂹𑂓𑂵𑂠 १. - 𑂮𑂥 𑂪𑂷𑂏 𑂄𑂔𑂰𑂠𑂵 𑂔𑂢𑂹𑂧 𑂪𑂵𑂥 𑂯𑂟𑂹𑂩 𑂞𑂟𑂰 𑂮𑂥 𑂍𑂵 𑂥𑂩𑂰𑂥𑂩𑂵 𑂮𑂧𑂹𑂧𑂰𑂢 𑂄𑂇𑂩 𑂄𑂡𑂹𑂞𑂹𑂩𑂰𑂢 𑂯𑂆। 𑂯𑂳𑂢𑂹𑂨𑂹𑂫𑂷 𑂍𑂵 𑂐𑂰𑂮 𑂮𑂧𑂕-𑂥𑂴𑂕 𑂄𑂇𑂩 𑂄𑂢𑂹𑂞𑂹𑂩𑂹𑂍𑂩𑂝 𑂍𑂵 𑂄𑂫𑂰𑂔 𑂯𑂷𑂥 𑂯𑂟𑂹𑂩। 𑂄𑂇𑂩 𑂯𑂳𑂢𑂹𑂍𑂰 𑂠𑂷𑂮𑂩𑂷 𑂍𑂵 𑂮𑂰𑂟 𑂦𑂰𑂆𑂔𑂰𑂩𑂰 𑂍𑂵 𑂫𑂹𑂨𑂫𑂯𑂰𑂩 𑂍𑂩𑂵 𑂣𑂛𑂹𑂪 𑂯𑂟𑂹𑂩॥	
Mahl (Note: Dialect of Dhivehi used in Minicoy Island)	Thaana script (ސްމާހް)	**މާއްދާ** **١** - ހުރިހާ އިންސާނުން ވެސް އުފަންވަނީ، ދަރަޖަ އާއި ޙައްޤު ތަކުގައި މިނިވަންކަމާއި ހަމަހަމަކަން ލިބިގެންވާ ބައެއްގެ ގޮތުގައެވެ. އެމީހުންނަށް ހެޔޮ ވިސްނުމާއި ހެޔޮ ބުއްދީގެ ބާރު ލިބިގެން ވެއެވެ. އަދި އެމީހުން އެކަކު އަނެކަކާ މެދު މުއާމަލާތް ކުރަންވާނީ އުޚުއްވަތްތެރި ކަމުގެ ރޫހެއް ގައެވެ	
**Maithili**	Mithilakshar (𑒧𑒻𑒟𑒱𑒪𑒲) (Traditional)	𑒁𑒢𑒳𑒔𑓂𑒕𑒹𑒠 𑓑: 𑒮𑒦 𑒧𑒰𑒢𑒫 𑒖𑒢𑓂𑒧𑒞𑓁 𑒮𑓂𑒫𑒞𑒢𑓂𑒞𑓂𑒩 𑒁𑒕𑒱 𑒞𑒟𑒰 𑒑𑒩𑒱𑒧𑒰 𑒂 𑒁𑒡𑒱𑒏𑒰𑒩𑒧𑒹 𑒮𑒧𑒰𑒢 𑒁𑒕𑒱। 𑒮𑒦𑒏𑒹𑒿 𑒁𑒣𑒢–𑒁𑒣𑒢 𑒥𑒳𑒠𑓂𑒡𑒱 𑒂 𑒫𑒱𑒫𑒹𑒏 𑒕𑒻𑒏 𑒂𑒍𑒩 𑒮𑒦𑒏𑒹𑒿 𑒋𑒏 𑒠𑒼𑒮𑒩𑒏 𑒣𑓂𑒩𑒞𑒱 𑒮𑒾𑒯𑒰𑒩𑓂𑒠𑒣𑒴𑒩𑓂𑒝 𑒫𑓂𑒨𑒫𑒯𑒰𑒩 𑒏𑒩𑒥𑒰𑒏 𑒔𑒰𑒯𑒲।	
**Maithili**	Kaithi (𑂧𑂶𑂟𑂱𑂪𑂲) (Historical)	𑂃𑂢𑂳𑂒𑂹𑂓𑂵𑂠 १: 𑂮𑂦 𑂧𑂰𑂢𑂫 𑂔𑂢𑂹𑂧𑂞𑂂 𑂮𑂹𑂫𑂞𑂢𑂹𑂞𑂹𑂩 𑂃𑂓𑂱' 𑂞𑂟𑂰 𑂏𑂩𑂱𑂧𑂰 𑂄 𑂃𑂡𑂱𑂍𑂰𑂩𑂧𑂵 𑂮𑂧𑂰𑂢 𑂃𑂓𑂱'𑃀 𑂮𑂦𑂍𑂵𑂀 𑂃𑂣𑂢–𑂃𑂣𑂢 𑂥𑂳𑂠𑂹𑂡𑂱 𑂄 𑂫𑂱𑂫𑂵𑂍 𑂓𑂶𑂍 𑂄𑂋𑂩 𑂮𑂦𑂍𑂵𑂀 𑂉𑂍 𑂠𑂷𑂮𑂩𑂰𑂍 𑂣𑂹𑂩𑂞𑂱 𑂮𑂸𑂯𑂰𑂩𑂹𑂠𑂣𑂴𑂩𑂹𑂝 𑂫𑂹𑂨𑂫𑂯𑂰𑂩 𑂍𑂩𑂥𑂰𑂍 𑂒𑂰𑂯𑂲𑃀	
**Malayalam**	Malayalam Lipi (Note: Besides the Malayalam script, the language has been written in other scripts like Latin, Hebrew, Syriac & Arabic) (മലയാളം) (Official)	വകുപ്പ് ൧. - മനുഷ്യരെല്ലാവരും തുല്യാവകാശങ്ങളോടും അന്തസ്സോടും സ്വാതന്ത്ര്യത്തോടുംകൂടി ജനിച്ചിട്ടുള്ളവരാണ്‌. അന്യോന്യം ഭ്രാതൃഭാവത്തോടെ പെരുമാറുവാനാണ്‌ മനുഷ്യന് വിവേകബുദ്ധിയും മനസാക്ഷിയും സിദ്ധമായിരിക്കുന്നത്‌.	
**Malayalam**	Karshoni (Note: Nasranis of Kerala use a modified version of the Syriac script called Karshoni. See also: Suriyani Malayalam) (ܣܘܼܪܝܼܝܵࡥܝܼ ܡܲܠܲܝܵࡨܲܡ) (Historical / Liturgical)	ܐܘܿࡥ̱ܵܡ ܒ݂ܲܟܘܼܦ̱: ܡܲࡥܘܼࡪܝܲࡧܸܠ̱ܵܒ݂ܲࡧܘܼܡ ܬܘܼܠܝܵܒ݂ܲܟܵܫܲࡠ̱ܲࡨܘܿࡣܘܼܡ ܐܲࡥܬܲܣ̱ܘܿࡣܘܼܡ ܣܒ݂ܵܬܲࡥܬࡧܝܲܬ̱ܘܿࡣܘܼܡܟܘܼࡣܝܼ ࡡܲࡥܝܼܫ݁ܝܼࡣ̱ܘܼࡨ̱ܲܒ݂ܲࡧܵࡤ. ܐܲࡥܝܘܿࡥܝܲܡ ࡦࡧܵܬܪܲࡦܵܒ݂ܲܬ̱ܘܿࡣܸ ܦܸࡧܘܼܡܵܪܘܼܒ݂ܵࡥܵࡤ ܡܲࡥܘܼࡪܝܲࡥ ܒ݂ܝܼܒ݂ܹܟܲܒܘܼܕܕ̃ܝܼܝܘܼܡ ܡܲࡥܲܣܵܟࡪܝܼܝܘܼܡ ܣܝܼܕܕ̃ܲܡܵܝܝܼࡧܝܼܟ̱ܘܼࡥ̱ܲܬ܀	
**Malayalam**	Ponnani Lipi (Note: Mappilas of Kerala use a modified version of the Arabic script called Ponnani Script. See also: Arabi Malayalam) (عَرَبِ مَلَیٰاۻَمْ) (Historical / Liturgical)	مَنُۺْيَڔ٘لّٰاوَڔ٘مْ تُلْيٰاوَكٰاشَۼَّۻٗوڊُمْ اَنتَسّٗوڊُمْ سْوٰاتَنْڔّْیَتّٗوڊُۼْكُوڊِ جَنِچِّڊُّۻَّوَڔٰاڹْ. اَنْیٗونْيَمْ بْھڔٰاتْرْبٰھاوَتّٗوڊ٘ پ٘ڔُمٰارُوٰانٰاڹْ مَنُۺْیَنْ وِو٘یكَبُدِّھیُمْ مَنَسٰاكْۺِیُمْ سِدَّھمٰایِرِكُّنَّتْ.	
**Manipuri**	Meitei Mayek (ꯃꯩꯇꯩꯂꯣꯟ) (Official)	ꯑꯥꯔꯇꯤꯀꯜ ꯱. - ꯃꯤꯑꯣꯏꯕ ꯈꯨꯗꯤꯡꯃꯛ ꯄꯣꯛꯄ ꯃꯇꯝꯗ ꯅꯤꯡꯇꯝꯃꯤ, ꯑꯃꯗꯤ ꯏꯖꯖꯠ ꯑꯃꯁꯨꯡ ꯍꯛ ꯃꯥꯟꯅꯅ ꯂꯧꯖꯩ ꯫ ꯃꯈꯣꯏ ꯄꯨꯝꯅꯃꯛ ꯋꯥꯈꯜ ꯂꯧꯁꯤꯡ ꯁꯦꯡꯏ, ꯑꯐ ꯐꯠꯇ ꯈꯪꯏ, ꯑꯗꯨꯅ ꯑꯃꯅ ꯑꯃꯒ ꯂꯣꯏꯅꯕ ꯃꯇꯝꯗ ꯃꯆꯤꯟ ꯃꯅꯥꯎꯒꯨꯝꯅ ꯂꯣꯏꯅꯒꯗꯕꯅꯤ꯫	
**Marathi**	Balbodh (मराठी) (Official)	कलम १ : सर्व मानवे जन्मतः स्वतंत्र आहेत व त्यांना समान प्रतिष्ठा व अधिकार आहेत. त्यांना विचारशक्ती व सदसद्विवेकबुद्धी लाभलेली आहे आणि त्यांनी एकमेकांशी बंधुत्वाच्या भावनेने वागावे.	
**Marathi**	Modi script (𑘦𑘨𑘰𑘙𑘲) (Traditional)	𑘎𑘩𑘦 𑙑 : 𑘭𑘿𑘨𑘿𑘪 𑘦𑘰𑘡𑘪𑘹 𑘕𑘿𑘡𑘿𑘦𑘝𑘾 𑘭𑘿𑘪𑘝𑘽𑘝𑘿𑘨 𑘁𑘮𑘹𑘝 𑘪 𑘝𑘿𑘧𑘰𑘽𑘡𑘰 𑘭𑘦𑘰𑘡 𑘢𑘿𑘨𑘝𑘱𑘘𑘿𑘙𑘰 𑘪 𑘁𑘠𑘱𑘏𑘰𑘨 𑘁𑘮𑘹𑘝. 𑘝𑘿𑘧𑘰𑘽𑘡𑘰 𑘪𑘱𑘓𑘰𑘨𑘿𑘬𑘎𑘿𑘝𑘱 𑘪 𑘭𑘟𑘿𑘭𑘟𑘿𑘪𑘱𑘪𑘹𑘎𑘤𑘳𑘟𑘿𑘠𑘱 𑘩𑘰𑘥𑘩𑘹𑘩𑘱 𑘁𑘮𑘹 𑘁𑘜𑘱 𑘝𑘿𑘧𑘰𑘽𑘓𑘱 𑘊𑘎𑘦𑘹𑘎𑘰𑘽𑘬𑘱 𑘤𑘽𑘠𑘳𑘝𑘿𑘪𑘰𑘓𑘿𑘧𑘰 𑘥𑘰𑘪𑘡𑘹𑘡𑘹 𑘪𑘰𑘐𑘰𑘪𑘹.	
Marwari	Devanagari (मारवाड़ी) (Contemporary)	अनुच्छेद १ - सगळा मिणख जलम सूं आजाद है और मान-मरजादा अर हक्कां में बरोबर है। उणां ने बुध अर अंतरात्मा री देन मिली है और उणां ने आपां में भाईचारे रे भाव सूं रेवणो चाईजै।	
Marwari	Mahajani (𑅬𑅐𑅭𑅯𑅐𑅲𑅑) (Traditional)	𑅐𑅧𑅒𑅙𑅚𑅓𑅥 १ - 𑅰𑅗𑅮𑅳𑅐 𑅬𑅑𑅢𑅖 𑅛𑅮𑅬 𑅰𑅒𑅧 𑅐𑅛𑅐𑅥 𑅱𑅑 𑅒𑅭 𑅬𑅐𑅧-𑅬𑅭𑅛𑅐𑅥𑅐 𑅐𑅭 𑅱𑅕𑅕𑅐𑅧 𑅬𑅓𑅧 𑅪𑅭𑅔𑅪𑅭 𑅱𑅑। 𑅒𑅢𑅐𑅧 𑅧𑅓 𑅪𑅒𑅦 𑅐𑅭 𑅐𑅧𑅣𑅭𑅐𑅣𑅬𑅐 𑅭𑅑 𑅥𑅓𑅧 𑅬𑅑𑅮𑅑 𑅱𑅑 𑅒𑅭 𑅒𑅢𑅐𑅧 𑅧𑅓 𑅐𑅨𑅐𑅧 𑅬𑅓𑅧 𑅫𑅐𑅑𑅙𑅐𑅭𑅓 𑅭𑅓 𑅫𑅐𑅯 𑅰𑅒𑅧 𑅭𑅓𑅯𑅢𑅔 𑅙𑅐𑅑𑅛𑅑। (Note: Mahajani was employed for financial registers and accounting, rather than literary documents. Hence, it is common for vowels to be omitted entirely, often only discernible to people familiar with the script. Additionally, long and short vowels are not distinguished.)	
Mizo	Mizo alphabet (Mizo ṭawng) (Official)	Mi zawng zawng hi zalèna piang kan ni a, zahawmna leh dikna chanvoah intluk tláng vek kan ni. Chhia leh ṭha hriatna fím neia siam kan nih avangin kan mihring puite chungah inunauna thinlung kan pu tlat tur a ni.	
Mundari	Mundari Bani (𞓧𞓟𞓨𞓜𞓕𞓣𞓚) (Native)	𞓝𞓐𞓨𞓐𞓗-𞓱: 𞓛𞓐𞓗𞓤𞓨 𞓞𞓐𞓪𞓐 𞓢𞓐𞓢𞓤𞓮 𞓧𞓕𞓨𞓕𞓣𞓔 𞓐𞓜𞓐𞓙 𞓐𞓢𞓝𞓚𞓓𞓕𞓣 𞓢𞓐𞓣𞓤𞓓𞓕𞓦 𞓑𞓕𞓚𞓝𞓚 𞓗𞓕𞓗𞓐𞓝 𞓣𞓤 𞓖𞓐𞓨𞓐𞓧 𞓖𞓐𞓣𞓐𞓔𞓤𞓝𞓤 𞓕𞓡𞓕𞓨𞓕𞓡 𞓐𞓜𞓐𞓦 𞓗𞓐𞓣𞓕𞓗𞓐𞓣𞓚 𞓨𞓕𞓧𞓕𞓢𞓕𞓨𞓕. 𞓚𞓨𞓢𞓟𞓦𞓢𞓤 𞓛𞓤𞓥𞓕 𞓐𞓜𞓐𞓦 𞓖𞓚𞓮𞓭 𞓑𞓤𞓪𞓤𞓦 𞓖𞓚𞓭𞓟𞓣𞓤𞓓𞓕𞓙 𞓤𞓨𞓤𞓧𞓢𞓐 𞓨𞓕𞓧𞓕𞓢𞓕𞓨𞓕 𞓐𞓜𞓐𞓙 𞓚𞓨𞓢𞓟𞓙 𞓒𞓐𞓙𞓝𞓤 𞓞𞓕𞓦𞓤𞓓𞓕 𞓗𞓐𞓓𞓕 𞓒𞓤𞓢𞓕 𞓖𞓕𞓦𞓕𞓣 𞓗𞓕𞓢𞓕𞓝𞓚𞓘𞓕𞓙.	
**Nepali**	Devanagari (नेपाली)	धारा १. - सबै व्यक्तिहरू जन्मजात स्वतन्त्र हुन् ती सबैको समान अधिकार र महत्व छ। निजहरूमा विचार शक्ति र सद्विचार भएकोले निजहरूले आपसमा भातृत्वको भावनाबाट व्यवहार गर्नु पर्छ।	
Newari	Pracalit (𑐣𑐾𑐰𑐵𑑅 𑐨𑐵𑐫𑑂)	𑐢𑐵𑐬𑐵 𑑑. - 𑐦𑐎𑑂𑐎 𑐩𑐣𑑂𑐟 𑐖𑐣𑑂𑐩𑐖𑐵𑐟 𑐳𑑂𑐰𑐟𑐣𑑂𑐟𑑂𑐬 𑐰 𑐥𑑂𑐬𑐟𑐶𑐲𑑂𑐛𑐵 𑐣𑐵𑐥 𑐀𑐢𑐶𑐎𑐵𑐬𑐫 𑐳𑐩𑐵𑐣 (𑐄𑐟𑐶𑐐𑑂𑐫𑑄𑐎) 𑐖𑐸𑐂 𑑋 𑐂𑐥𑐶𑑄 𑐰𑐶𑐰𑐾𑐎 𑐰 𑐀𑐣𑑂𑐟𑐬𑐳𑑄𑐳𑑂𑐎𑐬𑐞𑑄 𑐫𑐸𑐎𑑂𑐟 𑐖𑐸𑐃𑑋 𑐂𑐩𑐶𑐐𑐸 𑐨𑐵𑐟𑐺𑐟𑑂𑐰 𑐨𑐵𑐰𑐣𑐵 𑐎𑐫𑐵 𑐕𑐩𑑂𑐴𑐾𑐳𑑂𑐫𑐵𑑄 𑐩𑐾𑐩𑑂𑐴𑐾𑐳𑐶𑐟 𑐰𑑂𑐫𑐰𑐴𑐵𑐬 𑐫𑐵𑐫𑐾𑐩𑐵𑑅 𑑋	
**Odia**	Oriya Lipi (ଓଡ଼ିଆ)	ଅନୁଚ୍ଛେଦ ୧: ସମସ୍ତ ମନୁଷ୍ୟ ଜନ୍ମକାଳରୁ ସ୍ୱାଧୀନ ଏବଂ ମର୍ଯ୍ୟାଦା ଓ ଅଧିକାରରେ ସମାନ । ସେମାନଙ୍କଠାରେ ବୁଦ୍ଧି ଓ ବିବେକ ନିହିତ ଅଛି ଏବଂ ସେମାନଙ୍କୁ ପରସ୍ପର ପ୍ରତି ଭ୍ରାତୃତ୍ୱ ମନୋଭାବରେ ବ୍ୟବହାର କରିବା ଉଚିତ୍ ।	
**Punjabi**	Gurmukhi (Note: In Pakistan, Punjabi is written using the Shahmukhi alphabet and in India, it is written using the Gurmukhi alphabet.) (ਪੰਜਾਬੀ) (Official)	ਆਰਟੀਕਲ ੧: ਸਾਰੇ ਇਨਸਾਨ ਆਜ਼ਾਦ ਅਤੇ ਹੱਕਾਂ ਤੇ ਇੱਜ਼ਤ ਦੇ ਲਿਹਾਜ਼ ਨਾਲ ਬਰਾਬਰ ਪੈਦਾ ਹੋਏ ਹਨ। ਉਹਨਾਂ ਨੂੰ ਤਰਕ ਅਤੇ ਜ਼ਮੀਰ ਦੀ ਦਾਤ ਮਿਲੀ ਹੈ ਅਤੇ ਉਹਨਾਂ ਨੂੰ ਇਕ ਦੂਜੇ ਪ੍ਰਤੀ ਭਾਈਚਾਰੇ ਦੀ ਭਾਵਨਾ ਨਾਲ ਵਿਹਾਰ ਕਰਨਾ ਚਾਹੀਦਾ ਹੈ।	
Rajasthani	Devanagari (राजस्थानी) (Official)	अनुच्छेद १. - सागला मिनख आज़ाद अर प्रतिष्ठा ने आधिकारां री बरोबरी लियोडा पैदा होवे। व्हां में इन बात री समझ अर विवेक होवे के व्हाने एक दूजे रे सागे भाईचारे सूं रैणों है॥	
**Sanskrit (Note: Despite lacking first-language speakers in the modern period, Sanskrit remains an official Scheduled and Classical language in India due to its cultural heritage. It serves as an intrinsic ceremonial language for Hindu and Buddhist rituals, having been documented across centuries and nations in various regional scripts. See also: Sanskrit Revival)**	Devanāgarī (Note: Originally known as Nāgarī, it is the most well-known script for Sanskrit today. Its status as the exclusive script is a modern development from the 19th century, driven by the introduction of printing presses and British colonial standardization.) (संस्कृतम्) (Contemporary)	अनुच्छेदः १ - सर्वे मानवाः स्वतन्त्रताः समुत्पन्नाः वर्तन्ते अपि च, गौरवदृशा अधिकारदृशा च समानाः एव वर्तन्ते। एते सर्वे चेतना-तर्क-शक्तिभ्यां सुसम्पन्नाः सन्ति। अपि च, सर्वेऽपि बन्धुत्व-भावनया परस्परं व्यवहरन्तु॥ (Note: This text is in Classical Sanskrit.)	
**Sanskrit**	Grantha Lipi (Note: Grantha was developed to write Sanskrit in South India, as writing in Tamil script was not suitable and was the standard for writing Sanskrit texts across South India for over a millennium. Still used by traditional Vedic scholars and in Hindu ceremonies in Tamil-speaking regions.) (𑌸𑌂𑌸𑍍𑌕𑍃𑌤𑌮𑍍) (Used by Tamil people only in religious-liturgical context)	𑌅𑌨𑍁𑌚𑍍𑌛𑍇𑌦𑌃 ௧ - 𑌸𑌰𑍍𑌵𑍇 𑌮𑌾𑌨𑌵𑌾𑌃 𑌸𑍍𑌵𑌤𑌨𑍍𑌤𑍍𑌰𑌾𑌃 𑌸𑌮𑍁𑌤𑍍𑌪𑌨𑍍𑌨𑌾𑌃 𑌵𑌰𑍍𑌤𑌨𑍍𑌤𑍇 𑌅𑌪𑌿 𑌚, 𑌗𑍌𑌰𑌵𑌦𑍃𑌶𑌾 𑌅𑌧𑌿𑌕𑌾𑌰𑌦𑍃𑌶𑌾 𑌚 𑌸𑌮𑌾𑌨𑌾𑌃 𑌏𑌵 𑌵𑌰𑍍𑌤𑌨𑍍𑌤𑍇। 𑌏𑌤𑍇 𑌸𑌰𑍍𑌵𑍇 𑌚𑍇𑌤𑌨𑌾-𑌤𑌰𑍍𑌕-𑌶𑌕𑍍𑌤𑌿𑌭𑍍𑌯𑌾𑌂 𑌸𑍁𑌸𑌮𑍍𑌪𑌨𑍍𑌨𑌾𑌃 𑌸𑌨𑍍𑌤𑌿। 𑌅𑌪𑌿 𑌚, 𑌸𑌰𑍍𑌵𑍇𑌽𑌪𑌿 𑌬𑌨𑍍𑌧𑍁𑌤𑍍𑌵-𑌭𑌾𑌵𑌨𑌯𑌾 𑌪𑌰𑌸𑍍𑌪𑌰𑌂 𑌵𑍍𑌯𑌵𑌹𑌰𑌨𑍍𑌤𑍁।	
**Sanskrit**	Śāradā (Note: Śāradā was the principal script for Sanskrit in the Kashmir region and northwestern Indic sphere for centuries. It is now largely restricted to religious and ceremonial use by the Kashmiri Pandit community.) (𑆱𑆁𑆱𑇀𑆑𑆸𑆠𑆩𑇀) (Used in Kashmir region in a religious-liturgical context.)	𑆃𑆤𑆶𑆖𑇀𑆗𑆼𑆢𑆂 𑇑 - 𑆱𑆫𑇀𑆮𑆼 𑆩𑆳𑆤𑆮𑆳𑆂 𑆱𑇀𑆮𑆠𑆤𑇀𑆠𑇀𑆫𑆠𑆳𑆂 𑆱𑆩𑆶𑆠𑇀𑆥𑆤𑇀𑆤𑆳𑆂 𑆮𑆫𑇀𑆠𑆤𑇀𑆠𑆼 𑆃𑆥𑆴 𑆖, 𑆓𑆿𑆫𑆮𑆢𑆸𑆯𑆳 𑆃𑆣𑆴𑆑𑆳𑆫𑆢𑆸𑆯𑆳 𑆖 𑆱𑆩𑆳𑆤𑆳𑆂 𑆍𑆮 𑆮𑆫𑇀𑆠𑆤𑇀𑆠𑆼𑇅 𑆍𑆠𑆼 𑆱𑆫𑇀𑆮𑆼 𑆖𑆼𑆠𑆤𑆳-𑆠𑆫𑇀𑆑-𑆯𑆑𑇀𑆠𑆴𑆨𑇀𑆪𑆳𑆁 𑆱𑆶𑆱𑆩𑇀𑆥𑆤𑇀𑆤𑆳𑆂 𑆱𑆤𑇀𑆠𑆴𑇅 𑆃𑆥𑆴 𑆖, 𑆱𑆫𑇀𑆮𑆼𑇁𑆥𑆴 𑆧𑆤𑇀𑆣𑆶𑆠𑇀𑆮-𑆨𑆳𑆮𑆤𑆪𑆳 𑆥𑆫𑆱𑇀𑆥𑆫𑆁 𑆮𑇀𑆪𑆮𑆲𑆫𑆤𑇀𑆠𑆶॥	
**Sanskrit**	Tigalari (Note: A Southern Brahmic script which was primarily used for writing Vedic texts in Sanskrit. Presently used in the Tulu Nadu region by Brahmin communities (Shivalli, Havyaka, & Kota) to document Vedic mantras, Upanishads, Jyotisha and Dharmaśāstra.) (𑎱𑏌𑎱𑏎𑎒𑎽𑎡𑏌) (Used in Tulu Nadu region in a religious-liturgical context.)	(being encoded)	
**Sanskrit**	Tirhuta (Note: Originating in the Mithila region (modern-day Bihar and parts of Nepal), Tirhuta was the primary vehicle for Sanskrit in Eastern India for centuries. It was used for extensive Sanskrit works, like Panjikas (genealogical records), religious texts, and literature by Maithil Pundits.) (𑒮𑓀𑒮𑓂𑒏𑒵𑒞𑒧𑓂) (Used in Eastern India in a religious-liturgical context)	𑒁𑒢𑒳𑒔𑓂𑒕𑒹𑒠𑓁 𑓑 - 𑒮𑒩𑓂𑒫𑒹 𑒧𑒰𑒢𑒫𑒰𑓁 𑒮𑓂𑒫𑒞𑒢𑓂𑒞𑓂𑒩𑒞𑒰𑓁 𑒮𑒧𑒳𑒞𑓂𑒣𑒢𑓂𑒢𑒰𑓁 𑒫𑒩𑓂𑒞𑒢𑓂𑒞𑒹 𑒁𑒣𑒱 𑒔, 𑒑𑒾𑒩𑒫𑒠𑒵𑒬𑒰 𑒁𑒡𑒱𑒏𑒰𑒩𑒠𑒵𑒬𑒰 𑒔 𑒮𑒧𑒰𑒢𑒰𑓁 𑒋𑒫 𑒫𑒩𑓂𑒞𑒢𑓂𑒞𑒹। 𑒋𑒞𑒹 𑒮𑒩𑓂𑒫𑒹 𑒔𑒹𑒞𑒢𑒰-𑒞𑒩𑓂𑒏-𑒬𑒏𑓂𑒞𑒱𑒦𑓂𑒨𑒰𑓀 𑒮𑒳𑒮𑒧𑓂𑒣𑒢𑓂𑒢𑒰𑓁 𑒮𑒢𑓂𑒞𑒱। 𑒁𑒣𑒱 𑒔, 𑒮𑒩𑓂𑒫𑒹𑓄𑒣𑒱 𑒥𑒢𑓂𑒡𑒳𑒞𑓂𑒫-𑒦𑒰𑒫𑒢𑒨𑒰 𑒣𑒩𑒮𑓂𑒣𑒩𑓀 𑒫𑓂𑒨𑒫𑒯𑒩𑒢𑓂𑒞𑒳 ॥	
**Sanskrit**	Nandinagari (Note: Nandināgarī is a southern variant of the Nāgarī script, and it was the official script of the Vijayanagara Empire. Used extensively for Sanskrit copper plate inscriptions and palm-leaf manuscripts in Karnataka, Andhra Pradesh, and Maharashtra. Nandināgarī and Devanāgarī scripts are very close and share many similarities, but they also show systematic differences.) (𑧍𑧞𑧍𑧠𑦮𑧖𑦽𑧆𑧠) (Historical in Deccan region. Presently inactive)	𑦠𑧁𑧔𑦳𑧠𑦴𑧚𑦿𑧟 ೧ - 𑧍𑧈𑧠𑧊𑧚 𑧆𑧑𑧁𑧊𑧑𑧟 𑧍𑧠𑧊𑦽𑧁𑧠𑦽𑧠𑧈𑦽𑧑𑧟 𑧍𑧆𑧔𑦽𑧠𑧂𑧁𑧠𑧁𑧑𑧟 𑧊𑧈𑧠𑦽𑧁𑧠𑦽𑧚 𑦠𑧂𑧒 𑦳, 𑦰𑧝𑧈𑧊𑦿𑧖𑧋𑧑 𑦠𑧀𑧒𑦮𑧑𑧈𑦿𑧖𑧋𑧑 𑦳 𑧍𑧆𑧑𑧁𑧑𑧟 𑦪𑧊 𑧊𑧈𑧠𑦽𑧁𑧠𑦽𑧚। 𑦪𑦽𑧚 𑧍𑧈𑧠𑧊𑧚 𑦳𑧚𑦽𑧁𑧑-𑦽𑧈𑧠𑦮-𑧋𑦮𑧠𑦽𑧒𑧅𑧠𑧇𑧑𑧞 𑧍𑧔𑧍𑧆𑧠𑧂𑧁𑧠𑧁𑧑𑧟 𑧍𑧁𑧠𑦽𑧒। 𑦠𑧂𑧒 𑦳, 𑧍𑧈𑧠𑧊𑧚𑧡𑧂𑧒 𑧄𑧁𑧠𑧀𑧔𑦽𑧠𑧊-𑧅𑧑𑧊𑧁𑧇𑧑 𑧂𑧈𑧍𑧠𑧂𑧈𑧞 𑧊𑧠𑧇𑧊𑧎𑧈𑧁𑧠𑦽𑧔 ॥	
**Sanskrit**	Siddhaṃ (Note: Siddhaṃ means "accomplished", "completed" or "perfected" in Sanskrit. It was used in India from the 6th-13th centuries by Indian Buddhists. Its usage survives into the modern period for liturgical purposes in Japan and Korea by East Asian Buddhists.) (𑖭𑖽𑖭𑖿𑖎𑖴𑖝𑖦𑖿) (Historical in India, presently active in Japan & Korea)	𑖀𑖡𑖲𑖓𑖿𑖔𑖸𑖟𑖾 १ - 𑖭𑖨𑖿𑖪𑖸 𑖦𑖯𑖡𑖪𑖯𑖾 𑖭𑖿𑖪𑖝𑖡𑖿𑖝𑖿𑖨𑖝𑖯𑖾 𑖭𑖦𑗜𑖝𑖿𑖢𑖡𑖿𑖡𑖯𑖾 𑖪𑖨𑖿𑖝𑖡𑖿𑖝𑖸 𑖀𑖢𑖰 𑖓, 𑖐𑖻𑖨𑖪𑖟𑖴𑖫𑖯 𑖀𑖠𑖰𑖎𑖯𑖨𑖟𑖴𑖫𑖯 𑖓 𑖭𑖦𑖯𑖡𑖯𑖾 𑖊𑖪 𑖪𑖨𑖿𑖝𑖡𑖿𑖝𑖸𑗂 𑖊𑖝𑖸 𑖭𑖨𑖿𑖪𑖸 𑖓𑖸𑖝𑖡𑖯-𑖝𑖨𑖿𑖎-𑖫𑖎𑖿𑖝𑖰𑖥𑖿𑖧𑖯𑖽 𑖭𑗜𑖭𑖦𑖿𑖢𑖡𑖿𑖡𑖯𑖾 𑖭𑖡𑖿𑖝𑖰𑗂 𑗅 𑖀𑖢𑖰 𑖓, 𑖭𑖨𑖿𑖪𑖸𑖢𑖰 𑖤𑖡𑖿𑖠𑗜𑖝𑖿𑖪-𑖥𑖯𑖪𑖡𑖧𑖯 𑖢𑖨𑖭𑖿𑖢𑖨𑖽 𑖪𑖿𑖧𑖪𑖮𑖨𑖡𑖿𑖝𑗜𑗂 𑗉 (Note: Siddhaṃ is still mostly handwritten. Over time, additional markings were developed like punctuation marks, head marks, repetition marks, end marks, special ligatures and several ornaments of the scribe's choice, which are not currently encoded. The nuqta (𑗀 ) is also used in some modern Siddhaṃ texts.)	
**Sanskrit**	Bhaiksuki (Note: Bhaikshuki was used around the 11th-12th centuries in Eastern India and parts of Tibet and Nepal. Very few manuscripts and attestations are available so far.) (𑰭𑰽𑰭𑰿𑰎𑰴𑰝𑰦𑰿) (Ancient)	𑰀𑰡𑰲𑰓𑰿𑰔𑰸𑰟𑰾 𑱑 - 𑰭𑰨𑰿𑰪𑰸 𑰦𑰯𑰡𑰪𑰯𑰾 𑰕𑰡𑰿𑰦𑰡𑰯𑰾 𑰭𑰿𑰪𑰝𑰡𑰿𑰝𑰿𑰨𑰯𑰾 𑰪𑰹𑰧𑰎𑰿𑰝𑰰𑰎𑰐𑰹𑰨𑰪𑰸𑰜 𑰀𑰠𑰰𑰎𑰯𑰨𑰸𑰜 𑰓 𑰝𑰲𑰩𑰿𑰧𑰯𑰾 𑰊𑰪 𑱁 𑰭𑰨𑰿𑰪𑰸𑰬𑰯𑰽 𑰪𑰰𑰪𑰸𑰎𑰾 𑰁𑰝𑰿𑰦𑰭𑰯𑰎𑰿𑰬𑰱 𑰓 𑰪𑰨𑰿𑰝𑰝𑰸 𑱁 𑰭𑰨𑰿𑰪𑰸 𑰢𑰨𑰭𑰿𑰢𑰨𑰽 𑰥𑰿𑰨𑰯𑰝𑰴𑰥𑰯𑰪𑰸𑰡 𑰪𑰿𑰧𑰪𑰮𑰨𑰸𑰧𑰲𑰾 𑱂	
**Sanskrit**	Kharoṣṭhī (Note: Kharoṣṭhī emerged in the Gandhara region. While it was primarily used for Gandhari Prakrit, it was also used to write Sanskrit in the northwestern areas and Central Asia until approximately the 4th century. It died out by the 7th century without leaving any modern descendant scripts.) (𐨯𐨎𐨯𐨿𐨐𐨃𐨟𐨨𐨿) (Archaic)	𐨀𐨣𐨂𐨕𐨿𐨖𐨅𐨡𐨏 𐩀 - 𐨯𐨪𐨿𐨬𐨅 𐨨𐨌𐨣𐨬𐨌𐨏 𐨯𐨿𐨬𐨟𐨣𐨿𐨟𐨿𐨪𐨟𐨌𐨏 𐨯𐨨𐨂𐨟𐨿𐨤𐨣𐨿𐨣𐨌𐨏 𐨬𐨪𐨿𐨟𐨣𐨿𐨟𐨅 𐨀𐨤𐨁 𐨕, 𐨒𐨆𐨌𐨪𐨬𐨡𐨃𐨭𐨌 𐨀𐨢𐨁𐨐𐨌𐨪𐨡𐨃𐨭𐨌 𐨕 𐨯𐨨𐨌𐨣𐨌𐨏 𐨀𐨅𐨬 𐨬𐨪𐨿𐨟𐨣𐨿𐨟𐨅𐩖 𐨀𐨅𐨟𐨅 𐨯𐨪𐨿𐨬𐨅 𐨕𐨅𐨟𐨣𐨌-𐨟𐨪𐨿𐨐-𐨭𐨐𐨿𐨟𐨁𐨧𐨿𐨩𐨌𐨎 𐨯𐨂𐨯𐨨𐨿𐨤𐨣𐨿𐨣𐨌𐨏 𐨯𐨣𐨿𐨟𐨁𐩖 𐨀𐨤𐨁 𐨕, 𐨯𐨪𐨿𐨬𐨅𐨤𐨁 𐨦𐨣𐨿𐨢𐨂𐨟𐨿𐨬-𐨧𐨌𐨬𐨣𐨩𐨌 𐨤𐨪𐨯𐨿𐨤𐨪𐨎 𐨬𐨿𐨩𐨬𐨱𐨪𐨣𐨿𐨟𐨂 𐩗 (Note: Unlike most Indian scripts, Kharoṣṭhī was written from right to left.)	
**Sanskrit**	Ashokan Brāhmī (Note: Brāhmī is the mother of almost all modern Indian scripts. It was used to record the earliest surviving Sanskrit inscriptions, such as the Junagadh rock inscription of Rudradaman (c. 150 CE). It developed into the Gupta script, which then branched into northern scripts like Devanāgarī and Śāradā.) (𑀲𑀁𑀲𑁆𑀓𑀾𑀢𑀫𑁆) (Archaic)	𑀅𑀦𑀼𑀘𑁆𑀙𑁂𑀤𑀂 𑁧 - 𑀲𑀭𑁆𑀯𑁂 𑀫𑀸𑀦𑀯𑀸𑀂 𑀲𑁆𑀯𑀢𑀦𑁆𑀢𑁆𑀭𑀢𑀸𑀂 𑀲𑀫𑀼𑀢𑁆𑀧𑀦𑁆𑀦𑀸𑀂 𑀯𑀭𑁆𑀢𑀦𑁆𑀢𑁂 𑀅𑀧𑀺 𑀘, 𑀕𑁅𑀭𑀯𑀤𑀾𑀰𑀸 𑀅𑀥𑀺𑀓𑀸𑀭𑀤𑀾𑀰𑀸 𑀘 𑀲𑀫𑀸𑀦𑀸𑀂 𑀏𑀯 𑀯𑀭𑁆𑀢𑀦𑁆𑀢𑁂 𑁇 𑀏𑀢𑁂 𑀲𑀭𑁆𑀯𑁂 𑀘𑁂𑀢𑀦𑀸-𑀢𑀭𑁆𑀓-𑀰𑀓𑁆𑀢𑀺𑀪𑁆𑀬𑀸𑀁 𑀲𑀼𑀲𑀫𑁆𑀧𑀦𑁆𑀦𑀸𑀂 𑀲𑀦𑁆𑀢𑀺𑁇 𑀅𑀧𑀺 𑀘, 𑀲𑀭𑁆𑀯𑁂𑀧𑀺 𑀩𑀦𑁆𑀥𑀼𑀢𑁆𑀯-𑀪𑀸𑀯𑀦𑀬𑀸 𑀧𑀭𑀲𑁆𑀧𑀭𑀁 𑀯𑁆𑀬𑀯𑀳𑀭𑀦𑁆𑀢𑀼 𑁈	
**Santali**	Ol Chiki (ᱥᱟᱱᱛᱟᱲᱤ)	ᱫᱷᱟᱨᱟ ᱑: ᱥᱟᱱᱟᱢ ᱢᱟᱹᱱᱢᱤ ᱠᱚ ᱡᱟᱱᱟᱢ ᱨᱮ ᱯᱷᱩᱨᱜᱟᱹᱞ ᱟᱨ ᱢᱟᱹᱱ ᱟᱨ ᱚᱫᱷᱤᱠᱟᱨ ᱨᱮ ᱥᱚᱢᱟᱱ ᱠᱚ ᱧᱟᱢ ᱟᱠᱟᱫᱟ ᱾ ᱩᱱᱠᱩ ᱴᱷᱮᱱ ᱵᱩᱫᱷᱤ ᱟᱨ ᱵᱤᱵᱮᱠ ᱢᱮᱱᱟᱜᱼᱟ ᱟᱨ ᱩᱱᱠᱩ ᱫᱚ ᱢᱤᱫ ᱮᱴᱟᱜ ᱡᱚᱱᱟ ᱥᱟᱶ ᱵᱚᱭᱦᱟ ᱞᱮᱠᱟ ᱵᱮᱵᱷᱟᱨ ᱞᱟᱹᱠᱛᱤ ᱠᱟᱱᱟ ᱾	
**Sindhi** (Note: Is a scheduled language in India without any state-level official status, as it is spoken mostly by the descendants of partition-era migrants. See: Sindhis in India.)	Sindhi Naskh (Note: Sole Official script in Sindh Province, Pakistan) (سِنڌِي) (Sole Official until Partition, Co-Official in India alongside Devanagari)	دفعه ١۔ سمورا انسان آزاد ۽ عزت ۽ حقن جي حوالي کان برابر پيدا ٿيا آھن. انھن کي عقل ۽ ضمير حاصل ٿيو آھي، ان ڪري انھن کي ھڪ ٻئي سان ڀائيچاري وارو سلوڪ اختيار ڪرڻ گھرجي.	
**Sindhi**	Devanagari (Note: Co-Official script in India along with Naskh script.) (सिन्धी) (Used in India alongside Nashk script by mostly ethnic Hindu Sindhis)	दफ़अ १: समूरा इंसान आज़ाद ऐं इज़्ज़त ऐं हक़न जी हवाले खां बराबर पैदा थिया आहिन। इन्हन खे अक़्ल ऐं ज़मीर हासिल थियो आहे, इन करे इन्हन खे हिक ॿिए सां भाईचारे वारो सुलूक इख़्तियार करण घुरजे॥	
**Sindhi**	Khudabadi (𑋝𑋡𑋟𑋐𑋢) (Traditional script used officially until the 19th c.e. when it was replaced by Naskh)	𑋏𑋓𑋩𑊰 𑋱: 𑋝𑋗𑋤𑋙𑋠 𑊲𑋟𑋝𑋠𑋑 𑊱𑋂𑋩𑋠𑋏 𑊷𑋟 𑊲𑋂𑋩𑋪𑋂𑋩𑋍 𑊷𑋟 𑋞𑊺𑋩𑋑 𑋂𑋢 𑋞𑋛𑋠𑋚𑋥 𑊻𑋠𑋟 𑋔𑋙𑋠𑋔𑋙 𑋒𑋦𑋏𑋠 𑋎𑋡𑋘𑋠 𑊱𑋞𑋡𑋑. 𑊲𑋑𑋪𑋞𑋑 𑊻𑋥 𑊰𑊺𑋩𑋪𑋚 𑊷𑋟 𑋂𑋩𑋗𑋢𑋙 𑋞𑋠𑋝𑋡𑋚 𑋎𑋡𑋘𑋧 𑊱𑋞𑋥, 𑊲𑋑 𑊺𑋙𑋥 𑊲𑋑𑋪𑋞𑋑 𑊻𑋥 𑋞𑋡𑊺 𑋕𑋡𑊶 𑋝𑋠𑋟 𑋖𑋠𑊳𑋀𑋠𑋙𑋥 𑋛𑋠𑋙𑋧 𑋝𑋣𑋚𑋤𑊺 𑊲𑊻𑋩𑋪𑋍𑋡𑋘𑋠𑋙 𑊺𑋙𑋌 𑊾𑋣𑋙𑋂𑋥।	
**Sindhi**	Khojki Sindhi (Note: Used exclusively by the Ismaili Khoja Community in the Sindh region.) (𑈩𑈭𑈞𑈵𑈝𑈮) (Historical)	𑈛𑈠𑈶𑈀 ૧𑈺 𑈩𑈤𑈯𑈦𑈬𑈺 𑉀𑈴𑈩𑈬𑈞𑈺 𑈁𑈐𑈶𑈬𑈛𑈺 𑈅𑈴𑈺 𑉀𑈐𑈶𑈷𑈙𑈺 𑈅𑈴𑈺 𑈪𑈿𑈞𑈺 𑈐𑈮𑈺 𑈪𑈨𑈬𑈧𑈰𑈺 𑈉𑈬𑈴𑈺 𑈡𑈦𑈬𑈡𑈦𑈺 𑈟𑈱𑈛𑈬𑈺 𑈚𑈭𑈥𑈬𑈺 𑈁𑈪𑈭𑈞 𑈺𑈸𑈺 𑉀𑈞𑈵𑈪𑈞𑈺 𑈉𑈰𑈺 𑈀𑈿𑈵𑈧𑈺 𑈅𑈴𑈺 𑈐𑈶𑈤𑈮𑈦𑈺 𑈪𑈬𑈩𑈭𑈧𑈺 𑈚𑈭𑈥𑈲𑈺 𑈁𑈪𑈰𑈺 𑉀𑈞𑈺 𑈈𑈦𑈰𑈺 𑉀𑈞𑈵𑈪𑈞𑈺 𑈉𑈰𑈺 𑈪𑈭𑈈𑈺 𑈢𑈭𑈄𑈺 𑈩𑈬𑈴𑈺 𑈣𑈬𑈂𑈎𑈬𑈦𑈰𑈺 𑈨𑈬𑈦𑈲𑈺 𑈩𑈯𑈧𑈯𑈈𑈺 𑉀𑈉𑈶𑈵𑈙𑈭𑈥𑈬𑈦𑈺 𑈈𑈦𑈘𑈺 𑈌𑈯𑈦𑈐𑈰𑈸 𑈺𑈹	
Sherpa	Devanagari (शेर्वि तम्ङ॓)	धारा १: तेरी मिमाङगी चिजिन तङ ओछाकी ग्युला क्येने ज्युन कुन्ड्यम गिवी । खोङ तिवा तेरीकी रिक्या ल्येमो खुर्ने हुङगु यिन तङ तेरीकी पर्ला चिरडील हुङगु लाका कि गोकी।	
Sherpa	Sambhota (ཤར་པའི་སྐད་ཡིག)	དོན་ཚན་དང་པོ། ཐམས་ཅད་མི་མང་གི་ཅིག་བྱིན་དང་འོ་ཆ་གྱི་རྒྱུ་ལ་སྐྱེས་ནས་འབྱུང་ཀུན་མཉམ་གྱི་རེད། ཁོང་ཚོ་ཐམས་ཅད་ཀྱི་རིག་པ་ལེགས་མོ་འཁུར་ནས་འོང་གུ་ཡིན་དང་ཐམས་ཅད་ཀྱི་བར་ལ་སྤུན་ཟླ་འོང་གུ་ལས་ཀ་བྱེད་དགོས།	
Sora	Sora Sompeng (𑃐𑃚𑃝)	𑃦𑃨𑃙𑃑𑃣𑃙𑃢𑃐𑃢 𑃒𑃢𑃙𑃐𑃤𑃖𑃢𑃙𑃥𑃐𑃣𑃙𑃠𑃤 𑃖𑃢𑃚𑃢𑃖𑃢𑃚𑃢𑃜𑃒𑃣𑃙 𑃘𑃦𑃘𑃘𑃣𑃙𑃙𑃢𑃦 𑃣𑃑𑃑𑃣𑃘𑃢 𑃑𑃣𑃑𑃑𑃣 𑃦𑃨𑃑𑃑𑃢𑃤 𑃕𑃙𑃢𑃦𑃨𑃝𑃟𑃢𑃔𑃨𑃢𑃙𑃑𑃣𑃙𑃢 𑃖𑃢𑃙𑃐𑃤𑃖𑃢𑃙𑃥𑃐𑃣𑃙𑃠𑃤. 𑃦𑃨𑃙𑃑𑃣𑃙𑃠𑃤𑃑𑃣 𑃒𑃥𑃔𑃨𑃔𑃨𑃠𑃤 𑃣𑃑𑃑𑃣𑃘𑃢 𑃒𑃤𑃒𑃣𑃟 𑃦𑃨𑃝𑃤𑃔𑃨𑃢 𑃖𑃣𑃙𑃙𑃣. 𑃦𑃨𑃙𑃑𑃣𑃙𑃢𑃐𑃢 𑃦𑃨𑃙𑃑𑃣𑃙𑃠𑃤 𑃣𑃟𑃥𑃢𑃙 𑃒𑃤𑃒𑃤 𑃣𑃑𑃑𑃣𑃘𑃢 𑃖𑃙𑃑 𑃖𑃙𑃑 𑃖𑃣𑃙𑃙𑃣.	
Sylheti	Sylheti Nagri (ꠍꠤꠟꠐꠤ)	ꠗꠣꠞꠣ ১: ꠢꠇꠟ ꠝꠣꠘꠥꠡ ꠡꠣꠗꠤꠘꠜꠣꠛꠦ ꠢꠝꠣꠘ ꠁꠎ꠆ꠎꠔ ꠀꠞ ꠅꠗꠤꠇꠣꠞ ꠟꠁꠀ ꠙꠄꠖꠣ 'ꠅꠄ। ꠔꠣꠁꠘꠔꠣꠘ ꠛꠤꠛꠦꠇ ꠀꠞ ꠀꠇꠟ ꠀꠍꠦ। ꠄꠞ ꠟꠣꠉꠤ ꠢꠇꠟꠞ ꠄꠇꠎꠘꠦ ꠀꠞꠇꠎꠘꠞ ꠟꠉꠦ ꠛꠤꠞꠣꠖꠞꠤꠞ ꠝꠘ ꠟꠁꠀ ꠀꠌꠞꠘ ꠇꠞꠣ ꠃꠌꠤꠔ।	
**Tamil**	Tamil Ariccuvaṭi (தமிழ்)	உறுப்புரை ௧: மனிதப் பிறவியினர் சகலரும் சுதந்திரமாகவே பிறக்கின்றனர்; அவர்கள் மதிப்பிலும், உரிமைகளிலும் சமமானவர்கள், அவர்கள் நியாயத்தையும் மனசாட்சியையும் இயற்பண்பாகப் பெற்றவர்கள். அவர்கள் ஒருவருடனொருவர் சகோதர உணர்வுப் பாங்கில் நடந்துகொள்ளல் வேண்டும்.	
**Telugu**	Telugu Lipi (తెలుగు)	అనుచ్ఛేదము ౧: ప్రతిపత్తిస్వత్వముల విషయమున మానవులెల్లరును జన్మతః స్వతంత్రులును సమానులును నగుదురు. వారు వివేచన-అంతఃకరణ సంపన్నులగుటచే పరస్పరము భ్రాతృభావముతో వర్తింపవలయును.	
Tulu	Tigalari (𑎡𑎻𑎳𑎻) (Historical / Officially adopted)	𑎪𑎸𑎡 𑎥𑎬𑎪𑎸𑎥𑎹𑎭𑎻 𑎱𑏐𑎮𑎮𑎥𑏐𑎡𑏐𑎬𑎮𑎸𑎣𑏎 𑎨𑏇𑎒𑏐𑎒 𑎔𑏈𑎬𑎮𑏇𑎞𑎻 𑎨𑏇𑎒𑏐𑎒 𑎲𑎒𑏐𑎒𑎻𑎭𑏂𑎞𑏎 𑎱𑎪𑎸𑎥𑎮𑎸𑎣𑏎 𑎦𑎻𑎜𑏐𑎜𑎻𑎮𑏂𑎬𑏏. 𑎀𑎒𑎻𑎭𑎻 𑎡𑎬𑏏𑎒 𑎨𑏇𑎒𑏐𑎒 𑎁𑎡𑏐𑎪𑎱𑎸𑎒𑏐𑎰𑎹𑎞𑏎 𑎦𑎻𑎔𑎬𑏏𑎡𑏂 𑎦𑎞𑏂𑎫𑎹𑎥𑎒𑎻𑎭𑎻 𑎨𑏇𑎒𑏐𑎒 𑎐𑎬𑎹 𑎐𑎬𑎹 𑎱𑏇𑎣𑎬𑎡𑏐𑎮𑎣 𑎩𑎸𑎮𑏇𑎞𑎻 𑎮𑎬𑏏𑎡𑎥𑏂 𑎪𑎭𑏏𑎦𑏇𑎞𑎻.	
Tulu	Kannada Lipi (ತುಳು) (Contemporary)	ಮಾತಾ ನರಮಾನಿಲು ಸ್ವತಂತ್ರವಾದ್ ಬೊಕ್ಕ ಗೌರವೊಡು ಬೊಕ್ಕ ಹಕ್ಕುಲೆಡ್ ಸಮಾನವಾದ್ ಪುಟ್ಟುವೆರ್. ಅಕುಲು ತರ್ಕ ಬೊಕ್ಕ ಆತ್ಮಸಾಕ್ಷಿಡ್ ಪುಗರ್ತೆ ಪಡೆಯಿನಕುಲು ಬೊಕ್ಕ ಒರಿ ಒರಿ ಸೋದರತ್ವದ ಭಾವೊಡು ವರ್ತನೆ ಮಲ್ಪೊಡು.	
Tulu	Malayalam Lipi (തുളു) (Regional)	മാതാ നരമാനിലു സ്വതന്ത്രവാദ് ബൊക്ക ഗൗരവൊഡു ബൊക്ക ഹക്കുലെഡ് സമാനവാദ് പുട്ടുവെർ. അകുലു തർക ബൊക്ക ആത്മസാക്ഷിഡ് പുഗർതെ പഡെയിനകുലു ബൊക്ക ഒരി ഒരി സോദരത്വദ ഭാവൊഡു വർതനെ മല്പൊഡു.	
Wancho	Wancho Alphabet (𞋒𞋀𞋉𞋃𞋕)	𞋙𞋞𞋩𞋛𞋔 𞋉𞋞𞋮𞋎𞋀𞋮 𞋔𞋜𞋘𞋯 𞋐𞋀𞋞 𞋔𞋁𞋞 𞋋𞋁𞋘 𞋚𞋕𞋉𞋯 𞋃𞋁 𞋐𞋛𞋯 𞋔𞋁𞋮𞋉 𞋋𞋁𞋜𞋫 𞋘𞋢 𞋌𞋞𞋝𞋮 𞋇𞋁 𞋊𞋞𞋫 𞋃𞋁 𞋉𞋞𞋮𞋊𞋞𞋮, 𞋃𞋁 𞋃𞋀𞋮 𞋈𞋁𞋘 𞋅𞋕𞋜𞋮 𞋔𞋁 𞋃𞋁𞋜 𞋃𞋁 𞋉𞋀𞋞 𞋈𞋁 𞋋𞋁𞋜𞋫 𞋀 𞋊𞋁𞋐𞋜.	
Wancho	Latin alphabet (Wancho)	Khunyek nusaa kim jaau kau tam hon ca je kan taiʔ mong thung pha puʔ ca nupu, ca caa lam goi ka cai ca naau la taiʔ aa paji.	
**Urdu** (Note: Urdu is a Persianised standard register of the Hindustani language, mutually intelligible with Hindi.)	Urdu alphabet in Nastaliq calligraphy style (اردو)	دفعہ ١۔ تمام انسان آزاد اور حقوق و عزت کے اعتبار سے برابر پیدا ہوئے ہیں۔ انہیں ضمیر اور عقل ودیعت ہوئی ہے۔ اس لیے انہیں ایک دوسرے کے ساتھ بھائی چارے کا سلوک کرنا چاہیے۔	

== See also ==
- Caribbean Hindustani
- Fiji Hindi
- Indo-Portuguese creoles
- Languages of Bangladesh
- Languages of Bhutan
- Languages of China
- Languages of Fiji
- Languages of Guyana
- Languages of Malaysia
- Languages of Maldives
- Languages of Mauritius
- Languages of Myanmar
- Languages of Nepal
- Languages of Pakistan
- Languages of Réunion
- Languages of Singapore
- Languages of Sri Lanka
- Languages of Trinidad and Tobago
- List of endangered languages in India
- List of languages by number of native speakers in India
- National Translation Mission
- Romanisation of Sindhi
