= Sentinelese =

Indigenous people of North Sentinel Island

- Sentinelese people on the beach of North Sentinel Island, 1974

Total population
- Unknown; Wide estimate: 15–500; Narrow estimate: 50–200

Regions with significant populations
- North Sentinel Island, India

Languages
- Sentinelese (undescribed)

Religion
- Traditional religion (Animism)

Related ethnic groups
- Possibly Jarawa or Onge
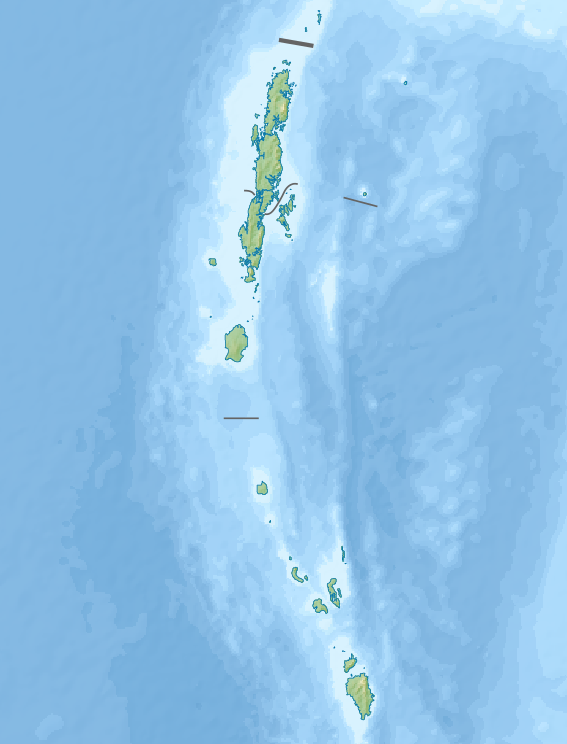
- North Sentinel Island (India) North Sentinel Island (Andaman and Nicobar Islands)

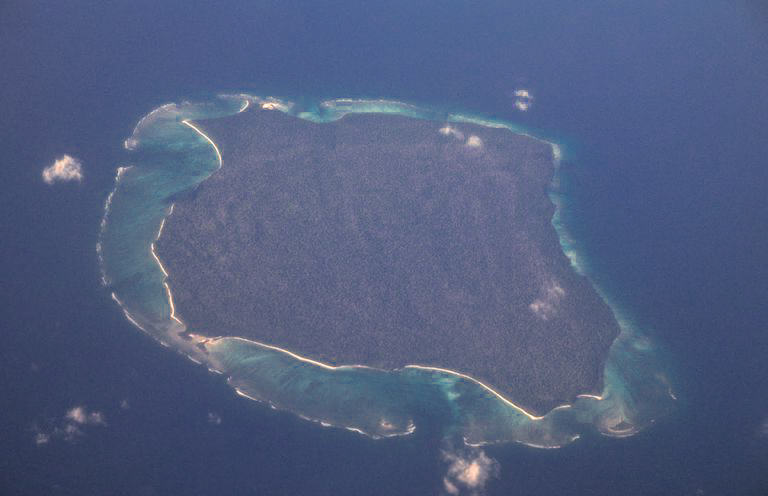
Aerial photograph of North Sentinel Island

The Sentinelese, also known as the North Sentinel Islanders, are Indigenous people who inhabit North Sentinel Island in the Bay of Bengal in the northeastern Indian Ocean. Designated a particularly vulnerable tribal group and a Scheduled Tribe, they belong to the broader class of Andamanese peoples.

Along with the Great Andamanese, the Jarawas, the Onge, the Shompen, and the Nicobarese, the Sentinelese make up one of the six indigenous (and often reclusive) peoples of the Andaman and Nicobar Islands. The tribe has had minimal contact with outsiders and has usually been hostile to those who approach or land on the island. While friendly contact was reported in the early 1990s, such instances are rare.

The Andaman and Nicobar Islands Protection of Aboriginal Tribes Regulation of 1956 declared North Sentinel Island a tribal reserve and prohibited travel within 5 kilometres (3.1 mi) of it. It further maintains a constant armed patrol in the surrounding waters to prevent intrusions by outsiders. Photography is prohibited, though some have gotten close enough to take pictures. There is significant uncertainty as to the group's population, with narrow estimates indicating between 50 and 200 individuals, and wider estimates indicating up to 500.

== Overview ==
=== Geography ===
The Sentinelese live on North Sentinel Island, (Note: The Onges call it Chia daaKwokweyeh.) in the Andaman Islands, an Indian archipelago in the Bay of Bengal. The island lies about 64 km (35 nmi) west of Andaman capital Port Blair. It has an area of about 59.67 km^{2} (14,740 acres) and a roughly square outline. The seashore is about 45 m (50 yd) wide encompassing a littoral forest that gives way to a dense tropical evergreen forest. North Sentinel Island, together with South Sentinel Island, forms the Sentinel Islands, a group of islands belonging to the Andaman Islands. The island is surrounded by coral reefs and has a tropical climate.

=== Appearance ===
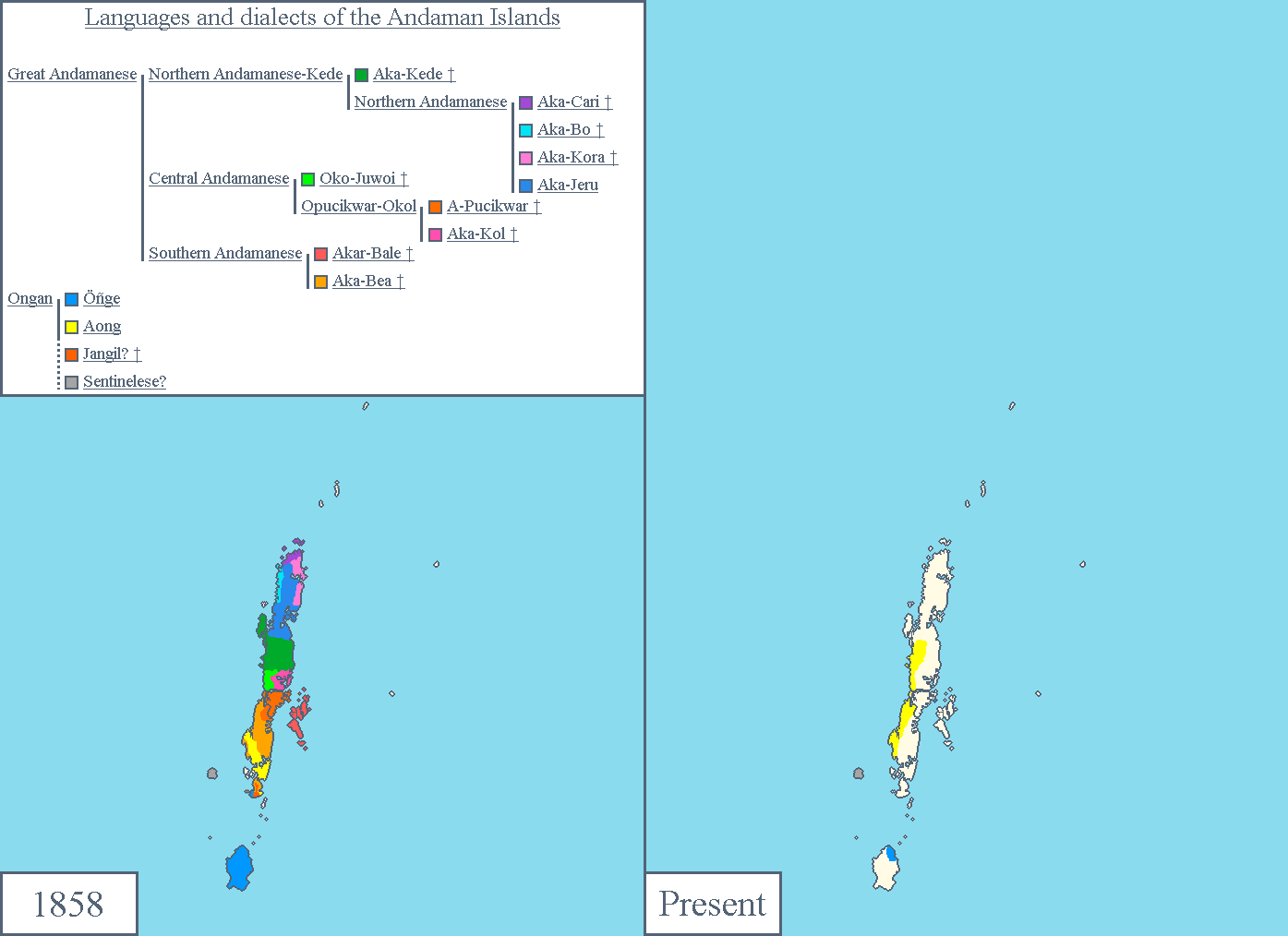
The distributions of different Andamanese peoples, languages, and dialects at the time of British contact compared to the present day

A 1977 report by Heinrich Harrer described a man as 1.60 m (5 ft 3 in) tall, possibly because of insular dwarfism (the so-called "Island Effect"), nutrition, or simply genetic heritage. During a 2014 circumnavigation of their island, researchers put their height between 1.60 and 1.65 m (5 ft 3 in and 5 ft 5 in) and recorded their skin colour as "dark, shining black" with well-aligned teeth. They showed no signs of obesity and had very prominent muscles. In March 1970, a group of Indian anthropologists, including T.N. Pandit, recorded the following description of the physical appearance of Sentinelese women: “In their height and stature they were equal to the men except that the lines were softer and they carried no arms.” The Sentinelese exhibit Negrito physical characteristics, sharing a medium height, dark skin, and curly hair, but they are taller than the Jarawa, Onge, and Great Andamanese groups, which are other tribes of the Andaman Islands.

=== Population ===
While no rigorous census has been conducted, the 1911 to 1921 census of India estimated the population at around 117, the 1931 census of India estimated the population at around 50, the 1971 census of India estimated the population at around 82, and the 1981 census at 100. A 1986 expedition recorded a count of 98. The 2001 census officially recorded 39 individuals (21 men and 18 women), however this survey was conducted from a distance and thus may not have been accurate. Expeditions in the wake of the 2004 tsunami recorded counts of 32 in 2004 and 13 in 2005. The 2011 census recorded 15 individuals (12 men and 3 women). During a 2014 circumnavigation, researchers recorded 16 individuals (6 women and 7 men, all apparently under 40 years old, and 3 children, apparently younger than four). A handbook released in 2016 by the Anthropological Survey of India on "Vulnerable Tribe Groups" estimated the population at between 100 and 150. Survival International has estimated the Sentinelese population to be between 50 and 150 people. Satyaki Paul (2024) estimated that the actual Sentinelese population is closer to 200.

=== Practices ===
The Sentinelese are nomadic hunter-gatherers. They use spears with bows and arrows to hunt terrestrial wildlife and more rudimentary methods to catch local seafood, such as mud crabs and molluscan shells. They are believed to eat many molluscs, given the abundance of roasted shells found in their settlements. It is evident that the Sentinelese relied on wild boar meat, monitor lizards, sea turtles, various types of fish and mollusks, fruits, and roots as their staple foods. They also depend on honey and the collection of native turtle eggs. They are not known to engage in agriculture. Like the Andamanese peoples up until the 19th century, the Sentinelese know how to use fire, but since they do not know how to start a fire themselves, they hide it and guard it very carefully. A small lime kiln was observed on the northwest coast of North Sentinel Island, and several charred seashells were also found. It remains unclear how the Sentinelese use lime.

Sentinelese women who collected coconuts after the gifts were dropped on the beach of North Sentinel Island, intently watching the contact team's activities.

Both sexes wear bark strings and the men tuck daggers into their waist belts. They also wear some ornaments such as necklaces and headbands, but are essentially nude. Usual habitations include small temporary huts erected on four poles with slanted leaf-covered roofs. Unlike the Jarawa or the Onge, the Sentinelese do not build permanent beehive-shaped huts; according to Portman’s account, they occasionally camp temporarily inside the buttress roots of trees, one of which was measured to be 8.2 m (27 ft) long and 4.6 m (15 ft) high, providing a natural shelter. They also set up temporary camps by simply laying out beds of fallen leaves in rows of equal numbers; in dry weather, the Sentinelese generally prefer to live near the wetlands in the northwestern corner of the island. However, a settlement belonging to a specific group has been discovered on North Sentinel Island, consisting of 20 small, makeshift huts. While they primarily forage for food as a group, the exact number of members is unknown; each of these small, makeshift huts has its own fireplace, suggesting the existence of nuclear or extended family units within these small groups.

T. N. Pandit stated that the Sentinelese have no community structure, no chiefs, and no shamans. Sentinelese social groups are relatively small, typically ranging in size from 3 to more than 18 members. Taking into account living space and available ecological resources, they are divided into three or four small groups based on kinship and a system of mutual reciprocity. In terms of gender based division of labor, adult women were observed carrying young children on their backs and providing them with affectionate care. Women have been observed carrying small, round nets and baskets, suggesting that fishing with nets in shallow waters is their primary livelihood. In contrast, since men are seen carrying bows and arrows, it is presumed that hunting and fishing are the domain of men.

Satyaki Paul (2024) posited that the Onge have an underdeveloped religious system based on animism, which he speculated might also be present among the Sentinelese. Based on the discovery of the concept of “Kuvera” (traditional medicine man) among the Onge, he further speculated that the Sentinelese might also have similar doctors or traditional healers who treat the various illnesses afflicting their people.

Although there is no evidence that the Sentinelese possessed knowledge of pottery, they at least knew how to extract iron from shipwreck debris and shape it for their own purposes. Captain Nineveh, who fled after being attacked by the Sentinelese in October 1867, testified that the Sentinelese arrowheads were made of iron. though the Andamanese scholar Vishvajit Pandya notes that Onge narratives often recall voyages by their ancestors to North Sentinel to procure metal. Residents of the island accepted aluminium cookware left by the National Geographic Society in 1974.

Sections of North Sentinel Island and Jarawa bow

The Sentinelese bow is a long, curved bow measuring about 1.4 m (4 ft 7 in) in length, with a cord made of twisted tree bark fibers secured to the ends of two tapered, grooved staves. The Sentinelese bow in the British Museum’s collection measured 155.5 cm (5 ft 1.2 in) in length. As for arrows, while most arrowheads are now made of iron, fishing arrows made from the fruit of the areca palm feature a sharp, four bladed harpoon style point. All arrows are very long, reaching approximately 1.5 m (4 ft 11 in) in length; they have a U-shaped groove at the rear for the bowstring and are wrapped with fiber cords to increase their strength. The arrow that struck a film crew member in 1974 had an iron nail firmly tied with tree bark attached to the end of an 2.4 m (8 ft) long bamboo shaft. In addition, these long arrows are sometimes used like spears, and arrowheads embedded with small spines from pigeon bones are also used; these appear to be primarily used for hunting pigeons.

The Sentinelese used a type of fishing spear with several pointed wooden prongs; a single flexible shaft was 1.86 m (6 ft 1 in) long and was equipped with four hard, pointed areca nut spearheads, each approximately 44 cm (1 ft 5 in) long; one of the spears found had a prong with an iron nail attached. The adze was an L-shaped wooden tool with an iron blade firmly attached to its end; the wooden part consisted of a debarked branch.

Among the Sentinelese artifacts is a whip resembling a straight bamboo skewer with a small 2.2 m (7 ft 3 in) long rod embedded in it; with one end secured, it may have been used to lower tree branches for gathering food. It has been confirmed that they used the spaces between bamboo nodes and nautilus shells as containers and for drinking water; nautilus shells were also used to bail water out of canoes. Hammer stones were used to shape pieces of iron into arrowheads and spearheads by striking them against a whetstone; the hammer stones were round with a handle, and traces of sharpening iron blades were found on the whetstones. The Sentinelese obtain resin, which is a hard, dry, black substance that burns well and is used to keep fires going.

The Sentinelese baskets, discovered in 1927, are exceptionally well-crafted. They are cone-shaped, measuring 12.4 m (41 ft) in diameter and 5.4 m (18 ft) in height. The lower part is woven around 17 vertical rods that are joined and secured together, while the upper part is shaped to form a thick rim. Bamboo jars are used to store clay for body painting. The Sentinelese fishing nets were woven from tree bark fibers to form the mesh, supported by bamboo frames, and featured a handle at the top; they were used to catch fish in shallow lagoons. The fishing nets used by the Sentinelese are quite similar to those of Jarawas and Onges.

During an expedition led by anthropologist Triloknath Pandit in 1967, his team documented a board made of soft porous wood at a Sentinelese camp in the forest interior. The board was divided into 64 squares, with alternate squares studded with pieces of stone and shell, reminiscent of a chessboard. It is uncertain whether the artefact was produced by the Sentinelese, or was encountered as flotsam; the purpose of the board for the Sentinelese is unknown. Other Andamanese tribes do not produce similar artefacts.

Canoes are used for lagoon-fishing, but long poles rather than paddles or oars propel them. They seldom use the canoes for cross-island navigation. Artistic engravings of simple geometric designs and shade contrasts have been seen on their weapons.

The women have been seen to dance by slapping both palms on the thighs while simultaneously tapping the feet rhythmically in a bent-knee stance.

The Sentinelese bury their deceased members, and Bonington noted that they bury deceased infants inside their huts and cover the graves with nautilus shell and other small seashells. In the cases of the fisherman in 2006 and John Allen Chau in 2018, both were buried on the beach, which means they were not buried in a communal burial ground and suggests that, as outsiders, they were not buried alongside other members of the tribe. The Sentinelese do have a custom of carrying pieces of their relatives’ jawbones or other small bones with them. Cannibalism among the Sentinelese is considered unlikely.

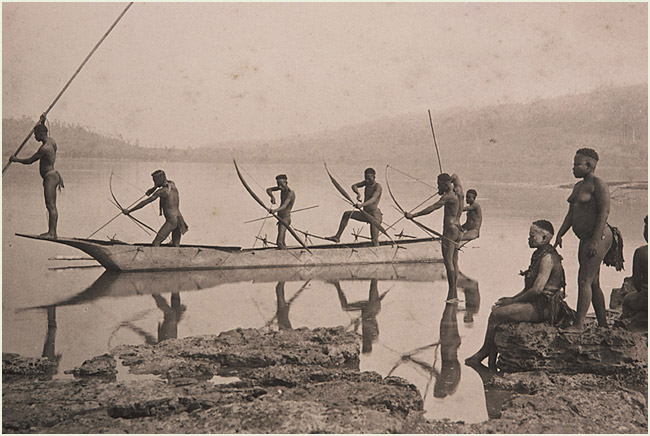
Members of an unspecified Andaman tribe fishing c. 1870

Similarities and dissimilarities to the Onge people have been noted. They prepare their food similarly. They share common traits in body decoration and material culture. There are also similarities in the design of their canoes; of all the Andamanese tribes, only the Sentinelese and Onge make canoes. (Note: The Onge call these canoes "Chanku-ate".) Similarities with the Jarawas have been also noted: their bows have similar patterns. No such marks are found on Onge bows, and both tribes sleep on the ground, while the Onge sleep on raised platforms. The metal arrowheads and adze blades are quite large and heavier than those of other Andamanese tribes. In Onge, North Sentinel Island was called Chia daaKwokweyeh, and the Sentinelese who lived there were called Chanku-ate.

=== Language ===
Because of their complete isolation, very little is known about the Sentinelese language, which is therefore unclassified. It has been recorded that the Jarawa language is mutually unintelligible with the Sentinelese language. The range of overlap with the Onge language is unknown; the Anthropological Survey of India's 2016 handbook on Vulnerable Tribe Groups considers them mutually unintelligible. Sentinelese songs consist of only two notes, and the Sentinelese can count only up to 2; they lack the ability to describe numbers beyond that and instead refer to them as “many.”

=== Isolation and uncontacted status ===
In 1956, the Indian government declared North Sentinel Island a tribal reserve and prohibited travel within 3 nautical miles (5.6 kilometres). Photography was prohibited. A constant armed patrol prevents intrusions by outsiders.

The Sentinelese are a community of indigenous peoples in voluntary isolation. Designated a particularly vulnerable tribal group and a Scheduled Tribe, they belong to the broader class of Andamanese people.

Along with the Great Andamanese, the Jarawas, the Onge, the Shompen, and the Nicobarese, the Sentinelese are one of the six often reclusive peoples indigenous to the Andaman and Nicobar Islands. Unlike the others, the Sentinelese appear to have consistently refused any interaction with the outside world. They are hostile to outsiders and have killed people who approached or landed on the island.

== History of contacts ==
The first peaceful contact with the Sentinelese was made by Triloknath Pandit, a director of the Anthropological Survey of India, and his colleagues, on 4 January 1991. Later, contact was made by Madhumala Chattopadhyay. Indian visits to the island ceased in 1997. An American, John Allen Chau, was killed in 2018 while visiting the island illegally as a Christian missionary.

=== Origin ===
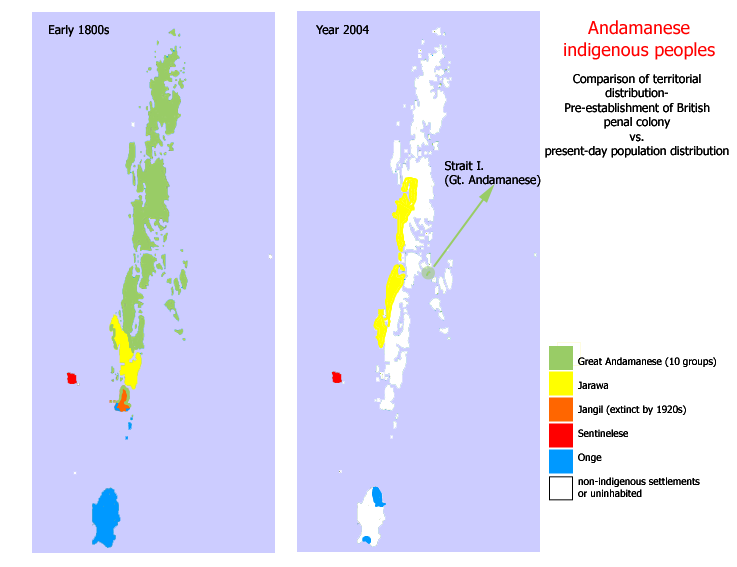
Comparative map showing distributions of various Andamanese tribes in the Andaman Islands – early 1800s versus present-day (2004). Notables: 1. Rapid depopulation of the original southeastern Jarawa homeland in the 1789–1793 period; 2. Onge and Great Andamanese shrinkage to isolated settlements; 3. Complete Jangil extinction by 1920s; 4. Jarawa move to occupy depopulated former west coast homeland of the Great Andamanese; 5. Only the Sentinelese zone is somewhat intact

It is estimated that the Sentinelese began living on North Sentinel Island approximately 60,000–30,000 years ago. Another study found that the Andamanese peoples migrated to the Andaman Islands approximately 37,000 years ago, and that about 24,000 years ago, the tribal peoples of the Andaman Islands became geographically isolated from the mainland, forming a distinct subclade known as M32. The study also suggested that, due to their geographical proximity, the Sentinelese are likely to share genetic characteristics similar to those of other indigenous groups. It was observed that the turtles had learned to avoid the Sentinelese, who were trying to catch them; considering that turtles are not among the fastest-learning animals in the world, this was interpreted as one piece of evidence suggesting that humans were able to settle on the island for an extended period.

Portman hypothesized that the Sentinelese had recently split off from the Onge people, and based on their similarities to the Jarawa people of South Andaman as recorded in the 1931 Indian census, he speculated that they had crossed the McPherson Strait on a raft but were swept out to sea by the currents, eventually landing and settling on North Sentinel Island. Cipriani hypothesized that the Sentinelese, who had been living on Little Andaman, were swept to their current location by a cyclone while fishing at sea.

The Great Andamanese had long been enemies of the Jarawa and the Sentinelese. According to the background information provided in Kavita Arora’s (2018) book regarding the Homfray incident, the Great Andamanese also spoke of a past experience they had on Rutland Island, during which they encountered the Sentinelese, who attacked them for no reason, and their chief was injured in the ensuing clash.

=== Hostility ===
The hostility between the Sentinelese and the Jarawa is believed to stem from some of their past negative experiences, and Portman noted that while the Sentinelese were initially quite docile, the situation deteriorated following repeated intrusions into their territory. It is believed that bringing the Aka-Bea, a member of the Greater Andamanese, along on the 1880 expedition actually backfired and further intensified the Sentinelese’s hostility.

Cipriani believed that the outcome would have been different if Portman and his party had not taken the Great Andamanese to North Sentinel Island. It is also presumed that the Indian government’s attempts to make contact during which cultural artifacts were taken without the Sentinelese’s consent or permission played a part in the situation. It is strongly suspected that the intermittent landings of poachers on the island which may have contributed to the Sentinelese’s persistent hostility are the primary cause of the phenomenon where the Sentinelese’s behavior fluctuates between being very friendly on one visit and hostile on the next. It is also speculated that shipwrecked sailors may have occasionally caused problems throughout the island’s history.

The Sentinelese appear to be well aware of the power of firearms and other weapons; if they judge that the intruders are relatively weaker than their opponents, they have a custom of hiding in the forest and watching from a distance rather than attacking. Once they hide, it is impossible for humans to track them down. With the exception of the 1880 incident, attempts to comb through the forest with heavily armed personnel have failed to locate them.

=== Colonial period ===
In 1771, an East India Company hydrographic survey vessel, the Diligent, observed "a multitude of lights [...] upon the shore" of North Sentinel Island, which is the island's first recorded mention. The crew did not investigate.

During a late summer monsoon in October 1867, the Indian merchant-vessel Nineveh foundered on the reef off North Sentinel. All 106 people on board 86 passengers and 20 crew members arrived safely on the beach, but on the morning of the third day, as they were heading to breakfast, they were suddenly attacked by naked islanders with short hair dyed red, who were wielding arrows tipped with iron. The captain, who fled in the ship's boat, was found days later by a brig and the Royal Navy sent a rescue party to the island. Upon arrival, the party discovered that the survivors had managed to repel the attackers with sticks and stones and that they had not reappeared.

The first recorded visit to the island by a colonial officer was by Jeremiah Homfray in March 1867. He recorded seeing naked islanders catching fish with bows and arrows, and was informed by the Great Andamanese that they were Jarawas. In March 1878, while sailing close to the eastern coast of North Sentinel Island aboard the British naval vessel Lifonian, Portman discovered two small huts that appeared to be quite sturdy and recently built. Portman recorded that the huts were about two miles apart, situated at the edge of the jungle, and that no inhabitants were visible. He referred to the incident involving the Nineveh in October 1867.

In 1880, in an effort to establish contact with the Sentinelese, the Royal Indian Marine officer Maurice Vidal Portman, who was serving as a colonial administrator to the Andaman and Nicobar Islands, led an armed group of Europeans along with convict-orderlies and Aka-Bea of the Great Andamanese trackers (whom they had already befriended) to North Sentinel Island. On their arrival, the islanders fled into the treeline. Portman and his men stumbled upon the camp and took a woman and four young children captive. They remained aboard the Constance for several days; the woman and one child were released after receiving a substantial amount of gifts. After several days of fruitless searching, Portman’s men discovered an abandoned village and a narrow path, where they captured an elderly man, a woman, and a child, during this incident, just as the old man drew his bow to shoot Lieutenant Hooper, who was present at the time, Amirullah a prisoner servant who had been positioned at the far right and was hiding behind cover leaped onto the old man’s back, disrupted his aim, and subdued him. bringing the total number of captives to six, including the three children they had captured earlier. The man and woman died of illness shortly after their arrival in Port Blair and the children began to fall ill as well. Portman hurriedly sent the children back to North Sentinel Island with a large quantity of gifts in an attempt to establish friendly relations. Survival International believes that the 1880 incident likely resulted in children spreading disease, with devastating consequences, and some view the intergenerational trauma stemming from this horrific experience and other similar ones as one of the reasons why the Sentinelese avoid contact with outsiders. Later, in his recollections of the Sentinelese, Portman said, “We cannot be said to have done anything more than increase their general terror of, and hostility to, all comers.”

Portman landed on North Sentinel Island in 1883 following the 1883 eruption of Krakatoa, but found only an abandoned village and no signs of the inhabitants. Concluding that the natives had scattered again, frightened by the landing party’s numerical superiority and firepower, the expedition left gifts behind and returned to Port Blair. In 1885, Portman searched the jungles of North Sentinel Island in an attempt to make contact with the Sentinelese again, but finding no one, he left gifts behind and withdrew. Later, in 1887, Portman visited the island again, this time accompanied by the Onge people. He attempted to make contact with the Sentinelese, but the Onge said they did not understand what was being said and believed the Sentinelese to be a different tribe from their own.

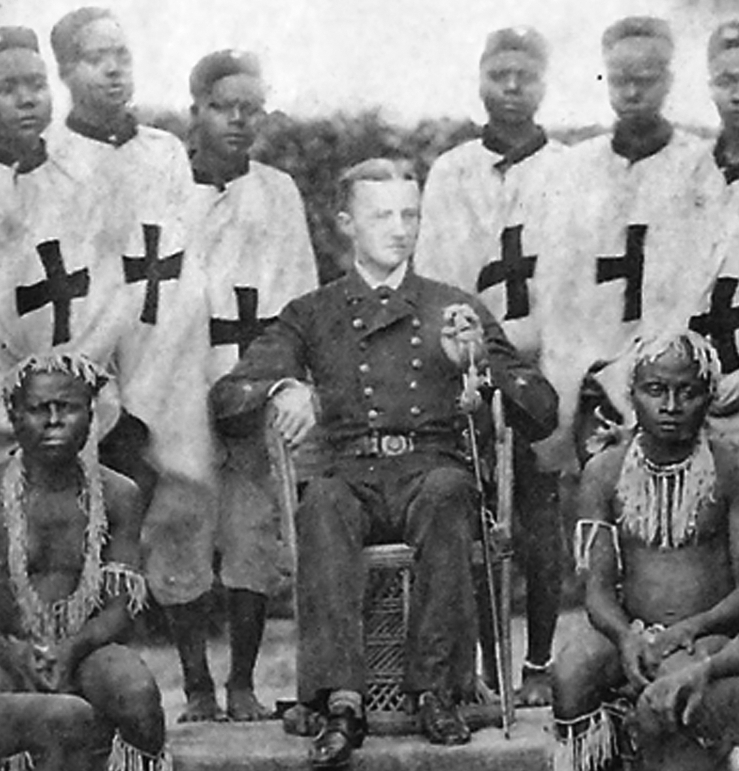
Maurice Vidal Portman photographed with Andamanese chiefs in British India

In 1896, a convict escaped from the penal colony on Great Andaman Island on a makeshift raft and drifted across to the North Sentinel beach. Portman and Doughty visited the island with 12 soldiers, a group of Andamanese, and three members of the Onge tribe, and His body was discovered by a search party some days later with several arrow-piercings and a cut throat. The party recorded that they did not see any islanders. It was presumed that they had fled north; Portman discovered five fire pits and four sand-bottomed canoes, and after spotting four fires on a nearby hill, he found a village with eight huts, where he discovered gifts that had been left in various places for the indigenous people.

In an 1899 speech, Richard Carnac Temple, who was chief commissioner of the Andaman and Nicobar Islands from 1895 to 1904, reported that he had toured North Sentinel island to capture fugitives, but upon landing discovered that they had been killed by the inhabitants, who retreated in haste upon seeing his party approach. Temple also recorded the case of a Sentinelese man named Dāūwacho-chégálé-bāī who drifted to the Onge people and lived among them for several years. In 1895, when Temple and Portman took Dāūwacho to the Sentinelese to attempt a friendly contact, upon arrival, Dāūwacho-chégálé-bāī called out to a group of Sentinelese, but “they showed the usual signs of fright and hostility,” and no closer contact was made. Portman cast doubt on the exact timespan the Sentinelese spent with the Onge, and believed that he had probably been raised by the Onge since childhood. Temple concluded the Sentinelese were "a tribe which slays every stranger, however inoffensive, on sight, whether a forgotten member of itself, of another Andamanese tribe, or a complete foreigner".

In his 1880 expedition, Portman recorded that the soil on North Sentinel Island was remarkably suitable for coconut cultivation, and Later, in the 1890s, Portman suggested that if the government decided to turn the entire island into a coconut plantation—since the island is naturally well-suited for such a purpose—they should capture Sentinelese men and keep them at the camp; if the rest of the people did not come voluntarily, they should be captured as well. This process should be continued until the majority of the island’s inhabitants had spent several days at the camp and become accustomed to us.

Other British colonial administrators visited the island, including Rogers in 1902, but none of the expeditions after 1880 had any ethnographic purpose, probably because of the island's small size and unfavourable location. M.C.C. Bonnington, a British colonial official, visited the island in 1911 and 1932 to conduct a census. On the first occasion, he came across eight men on the beach and another five in two canoes, who retreated into the forest. The party progressed some miles into the island without facing any hostile response and saw a few huts with slanted roofs. Eventually, failing to find anyone, Bonnington and his men left the island. During the 1932 visit, they reported seeing the grave of a dead infant inside a hut. Notably, the Sentinelese were counted as a standalone group for the first time in the 1911 census. Lieutenant-Colonel MJ Ferrar the North Sentinel Island in 1926, where he glimpsed three of its inhabitants. Taking bows, arrows, a paddle, and a skeleton for research, he left in their place the usual medley of files, mugs, plates, red cloth, and so on. Ferrar, who explored the island for six hours, estimated that it sheltered about sixty heads.

With the exception of a few brief visits during the 90 year period of British rule, the British paid little attention to this island, and for decades, it seemed as though its very existence had been forgotten. During World War II, the Andaman and Nicobar Islands were occupied by Japan, but since Japan did not maintain a long-term presence in the Andaman Islands, it had no opportunity to interfere; moreover, North Sentinel Island, in particular, was not strategically important. It also took India several years to take notice of the forgotten island; in the official 1951 census, the Sentinelese population was either listed using the 1913 estimate or not mentioned at all.

In 1953, some government officials approached the island, but a Sentinelese man who was alone on the shore drove them away by threatening them with a bow and arrows. On April 20, 1954, Lidio Cipriani attempted to land on the coast, but the attempt failed due to bad weather; he circumnavigated the island but did not spot a single Sentinelese person on the shore. He felt regret, believing that if he had landed with his Indian and Burmese companions who were prepared to take any risks his peace mission would ultimately have succeeded.

=== T. N. Pandit (1967–1991) ===
In 1967, a group of 20 people consisting of the governor, armed forces and naval personnel, were led by T. N. Pandit, an Indian anthropologist working for the Anthropological Survey of India, to North Sentinel Island to explore it and befriend the Sentinelese. This was the first visit to the island by a professional anthropologist. Through binoculars, the group saw several clusters of Sentinelese along the coastline who retreated into the forest as the team advanced. The team followed their footprints and after about 1 kilometre (0.62 mi) found a group of 18 lean-to huts made from grass and leaves that showed signs of recent occupation as evidenced by the still-burning fires at the corners of the hut. The team also discovered raw honey, skeletal remains of pigs, wild fruits, an adze, a multi-pronged wooden spear, bows, arrows, cane baskets, fishing nets, bamboo pots and wooden buckets. Metal-working was evident. The team failed to establish any contact and withdrew after leaving gifts.

The government claimed that leaving the Sentinelese (and the area) completely isolated and ceasing to claim any control would lead to rampant illegal exploitation of the natural resources by the numerous mercenary outlaws who took refuge in those regions, and probably contribute to the extinction of the Sentinelese people. Accordingly, in 1970, an official surveying party landed at an isolated spot on the island and erected a stone tablet, atop a disused native hearth, that declared the island part of India. Since the Sentinelese are unaware of the existence of writing or India, it is unlikely that this monument made much of an impression on them. During an expedition on March 29, 1970, the Sentinelese were observed engaging in sexual activity: one woman paired up with a warrior and sat on the sandy beach, embracing him passionately, while other women followed suit, each claiming a warrior for herself—it resembled a communal mating ritual. This scene continued for a while; although most of the people left, a few warriors remained on guard, and we approached the shore to throw them more fish. It is more likely that this behavior was a ritual of gathering, as men and women from all over the island had come together to face a new threat.

In early 1974, a National Geographic film crew went to the island with a team of anthropologists (including Pandit), accompanied by armed police, to film a documentary, Man in Search of Man. They planned to spread the operation of gift-giving over three days and attempt to establish friendly contact. When the motorboat broke through the barrier reefs, the locals emerged from the jungle and shot arrows at it. The crew landed at a safe point on the coast and left gifts in the sand, including a miniature plastic car, some coconuts, a live pig, a doll and aluminium cookware. The Sentinelese followed up by launching another volley of arrows, one of which struck the documentary director in his thigh. The man who wounded the director withdrew to the shade of a tree and laughed proudly while others speared and buried the pig and the doll. They left afterward, taking the coconuts and cookware. This expedition also led to the first photograph of the Sentinelese, published by Raghubir Singh in National Geographic magazine, where they were presented as people for whom "arrows speak louder than words".

During the 1970s and 1980s, Pandit undertook several visits to the island, sometimes as an "expert advisor" in tour parties including dignitaries who wished to encounter an aboriginal tribe. Beginning in 1981, he regularly led official expeditions with the purpose of establishing friendly contact. Many of these got a friendly reception, with hoards of gifts left for them, but some ended in violent encounters, which were mostly suppressed. Some of the expeditions (1987, 1992, et al.) were entirely documented on film. Sometimes the Sentinelese waved and sometimes they turned their backs and assumed a "defecating" posture, which Pandit took as a sign of their not being welcome. On some occasions, they rushed out of the jungle to take the gifts but then attacked the party with arrows. Other gestures in response to contact parties, such as swaying of penises, have been noted. On some of his visits, Pandit brought some Onge to the island to try to communicate with the Sentinelese, but the attempts were usually futile and Pandit reported one instance of angering the Sentinelese.

=== Leopold III expedition (1975) ===
In 1975, Leopold III of Belgium, on a tour of the Andamans, was taken by local dignitaries for an overnight cruise to the waters off North Sentinel Island. They kept the royal party out of arrow range, approaching just close enough for a Sentinelese warrior to aim his bow menacingly at the king, who expressed his profound satisfaction with the adventure.

=== Wreck of the Rusley ===
In 1977, the Rusley ran aground off the north coast of North Sentinel Island.

=== 1981 wreck of MV Primrose ===
On 2 August 1981, the MV Primrose, carrying a bulk cargo of chicken feed from Bangladesh to Australia, ran aground in rough seas just off North Sentinel Island, stranding a small crew. After a few days, the captain dispatched a distress call asking for a drop of firearms and reported boats being prepared by more than 50 armed islanders intending to board the ship. Strong waves prevented the Sentinelese canoes reaching the ship and deflected their arrows. The crew of 31 men were keeping a twenty-four-hour guard with axes, pipes, and flare guns. Nearly a week later, the crew was evacuated by a civilian helicopter contracted to the Oil and Natural Gas Corporation (ONGC) with support from Indian naval forces.

The Sentinelese scoured the abandoned shipwrecks to salvage iron for their weaponry. M. A. Mohammad, a scrap dealer who won a government contract to dismantle the Primrose wreck (about 90 m [300 ft] from the shoreline) and assembled men for the purpose, recorded friendly exchange of fruits and small metal scraps with the Sentinelese, who often canoed to the workplace at low tide:

After two days, in the early morning when it was low tide we saw three Sentinelese canoes with about a dozen men about fifty feet away from the deck of Primrose. We were skeptical and scared and had no other solution but to bring out our supply of bananas and show it to them to attract them and minimise any chance of hostility. They took the bananas and came up on board of Primrose and were frantically looking around for smaller pieces of metal scrap [...] They visited us regularly at least twice or thrice in a month while we worked at the site for about 18 months.

=== 1991 expedition ===
In 1991, the first instances of peaceful contact were recorded in the course of two routine expeditions by an Indian anthropological team consisting of various representatives of diverse governmental departments, including the anthropologist Madhumala Chattopadhyay. This was the first time a woman was a part of a contact expedition with the Sentinelese.

During a 4 January 1991 visit, the Sentinelese approached the party without weaponry for the first time. They collected coconuts that were offered but retreated to the shore as the team gestured for them to come closer. The team returned to the main ship, MV Tarmugli. It returned to the island in the afternoon to find at least two dozen Sentinelese on the shoreline, one of whom pointed a bow and arrow at the party. Once a woman pushed the arrow down, the man buried his weapons in the sand and the Sentinelese approached quite close to the dinghies for the first time. The Director of Tribal Welfare distributed five bags of coconuts hand-to-hand.

Pandya comments:

Those present in the defining moment of physical contact now wished to extract professional mileage from the fact of being actually 'touched' by the Sentinelese during the gift giving exercise. Every participating member of the contact party wanted to take the credit of being the first to 'touch the Sentinelese', as if it were a great mystical moment of transubstantiation wherein the savage hostile reciprocated a gesture of civilised friendship.

Who touched and who was touched during the contact event became an emotionally charged issue within various sectors of the administration where claims and counter-claims were sought to be established with earnestness and vigor ... it is interesting to note the range of political and cultural significance invested in this specific event of contact.

Pandit and Madhumala took part in a second expedition on 24 February. The Sentinelese again appeared without weapons, jumped on the dinghies and took coconut sacks. They were also curious about a rifle hidden in the boat, which Chattopadhyay believed they saw as a source of iron. However, during that expedition, one member of the contact team remained among the Sentinelese to observe them, while the other members were initially unaware of this. When two or three Sentinelese noticed this, they exchanged words; one of the young men then drew a knife and pretended to swing it to warn the others, and another man threw a piece of coral, but no one was injured. Pandit pointed out that the acts of drawing a knife and throwing a piece of coral could be interpreted as defensive actions and signs of warning.

In light of the friendly exchanges with the scrap dealers' team and Portman's observations in 1880, Pandya believes that the Sentinelese used to be visited by other tribes.

=== Later expeditions ===
The series of contact expeditions continued until 1994, with some of them even attempting to plant coconut trees on the island. The programmes were then abandoned for nearly nine years. The Indian government maintained a policy of no deliberate contact, intervening only in cases of natural calamities that might pose an existential threat or to thwart poachers.

A likely reason for the termination of these missions was that the Sentinelese did not let most of the post-Pandit contact teams get near them. The teams usually waited until the armed Sentinelese retreated, then left gifts on the beach or set them adrift toward shore. The government was also concerned about the possibility of harm to the Sentinelese by an influx of outsiders, a result of them projecting a relatively friendly image. Photos of the 1991 expedition were removed from public display and use of them was restricted by the government.

The next expedition was in April 2003, when a canoe built by the Onges was given to the visitors.

=== 2004 tsunami ===
Further expeditions (some aerial) in 2004 and 2005 evaluated the effects of the 2004 Indian Ocean tsunami, which caused massive tectonic changes to the island: it was enlarged by a merger with nearby small islands, and the sea floor was raised by about 1.5 m (4 ft 11 in), exposing the surrounding coral reefs to air and destroying the shallow lagoons, which were the Sentinelese's fishing grounds. The expeditions counted 32 Sentinelese scattered over three places but did not find any bodies. The Sentinelese responded to these aerial expeditions with hostile gestures, which led many to conclude that the community was mostly unaffected and had survived the calamity. Pandya argues that Sentinelese hostility is a sign of the physical as well as the cultural resilience of the community.

The Sentinelese generally received the post-tsunami expeditions in a friendly manner. They approached the visiting parties unarmed, in contrast to the arms or shields carried when meeting earlier expeditions. On March 9, 2005, the expedition visited the northeastern coast of North Sentinel Island, where approximately 13 Sentinelese were sighted; they were as friendly as ever and accepted the gifts dropped by the research team. This expedition marked the end of the era of gift-dropping missions.

=== 2006 killing of fishermen ===
On 27 January 2006, Indian fishermen Sunder Raj and Pandit Tiwari, who had been attempting to illegally harvest crabs off North Sentinel Island, drifted towards the island after their boat's makeshift anchor failed during the night. They did not respond to warning calls from passing fishermen, and their boat drifted into the shallows near the island, where a group of Sentinelese tribals attacked it and killed the fishermen with axes. According to one report, the bodies were later put on bamboo stakes facing out to sea like scarecrows. Three days later, an Indian Coast Guard helicopter, dispatched for the purpose, found the buried bodies. As the helicopter crew of four attempted to recover the body, between 50 and 100 Sentinelese attacked them with arrows and spears. At first, they flew about 1.5 kilometers away from the fishing boat’s location to lure the Sentinelese away, and after digging one of two pits, they discovered a body; however, they were forced to retreat because the Sentinelese returned so quickly. On their second attempt to recover the body, the Sentinelese appeared to have caught on to the previous ploy and split into two groups: one ran toward our helicopter, while the other guarded the body and the boat. Although the helicopter was equipped with a light machine gun, the crew did not consider opening fire due to the ban on shooting at the Sentinelese. As arrows began flying toward the Coast Guard helicopter, the situation rapidly deteriorated again. Commander Gaur, who was piloting the helicopter, abandoned the recovery of the body to protect his crew, and the mission was ultimately called off. There were contrasting views in the local community as to whether the Sentinelese should have been prosecuted for the murder.

Pandya hypothesises that the aggressive response might have been caused by the sudden withdrawal of those gift-carrying expeditions, which was not influenced or informed by any acts of the Sentinelese. He also notes that while the images of the hostile Sentinelese the helicopter sorties captured were heavily propagated in the media, the images of them burying the dead were never released. This selective display effectively negated the friendly images that circulated in the aftermath of the 1991 contact, which had already been taken out of public display, and restored the 1975 National Geographic narrative.

=== Aerial Survey and Circumnavigation of 2014 ===
In April 2014, reports of a wildfire on North Sentinel Island raised concerns about the safety of the island’s inhabitants. An aerial survey conducted by a team comprising the AAJVS, the Indian Bureau of Anthropological Research, and the Forest Department found narrow trails suggesting human activity, but no people or typical huts were observed.

A photograph taken during the third visit on the 2014 circumnavigation of North Sentinel Island, showing two of the three Sentinelese men who were spotted collecting coconuts at the water's edge where the water reached waist height in the ocean. Sentinelese men carry L-shaped weapons slung over their shoulders.

From April 18 to 19, 2014, a special investigation team circumnavigated North Sentinel Island aboard the M.V. Shompen to conduct further investigations. They reported sighting Sentinelese near Jarawa Islet and Constance Isle, and upon a second visit to the same location, two men wielding axes displayed a friendly demeanor. During the third visit, the team encountered two women sitting on rocks with a child and three men picking coconuts in water up to their waists; The three men were wearing necklaces made of seashells and bark belts around their waists; they had daggers tucked into their belts and L-shaped weapons slung over their shoulders, and they were waving their hands in a friendly gesture. Their heights were estimated to be between 1.60 and 1.65 m (5 ft 3 in and 5 ft 5 in). It was recorded that they had dark skin and straight, gleaming black teeth. Neither the man nor the woman showed any signs of obesity, and both were very muscular. Despite difficulties caused by high waves, interactions with the islanders were varied, and some residents displayed a friendly demeanor.

The total number of people gradually increased to 14; two boys between the ages of 18 and 20 were harvesting coconuts using canoes, while two men, approximately 30 to 32 years old, were fitting spears onto single bladed canoes. Interactions observed during subsequent explorations varied while some people appeared to be busy, they were not hostile, and on another expedition, approximately 16 people were observed. During a later expedition heading northward on the island, no islanders were encountered. All of the Sentinelese adults observed during the 2014 expedition appeared to be under 40 years of age, indicating that the community is not under threat.

=== 2018 killing of missionary ===
In November 2018, John Allen Chau, a 26-year-old American trained and sent by the US-based Christian missionary organization All Nations, travelled to North Sentinel Island with the aim of contacting and living among the Sentinelese in the hope of converting them to Christianity. He did not seek the necessary permits required to visit the island.

On 15 November, Chau paid local fishermen to take him to a point 500–700 metres (1,600–2,300 feet) from the island's shore, then continued to the island in a kayak. As he approached, he attempted to communicate with the islanders and offer gifts, but retreated after facing hostile responses. On another visit, Chau recorded that the islanders reacted to him with a mixture of amusement, bewilderment, and hostility. He attempted to sing worship songs to them, and spoke to them in Xhosa, after which they often fell silent, while other attempts to communicate ended with them bursting into laughter. Chau said the Sentinelese communicated with "lots of high-pitched sounds" and gestures. Eventually, according to Chau's last letter, when he tried to hand over fish and gifts, a boy shot a metal-headed arrow that pierced the Bible he was holding in front of his chest, after which he retreated again.

On his final visit, on 17 November, Chau instructed the fishermen to leave without him. The fishermen later saw the islanders dragging Chau's body, and the next day they saw his body on the shore.

Police subsequently arrested seven fishermen for assisting Chau to get close to the island. Local authorities opened a murder case naming "unknown individuals", but there was no suggestion that the Sentinelese would be charged and the U.S. government confirmed that it did not ask the Indian government to press charges against the tribe. Indian officials made several attempts to recover Chau's body, but eventually abandoned those efforts. An anthropologist involved in the case told The Guardian that the risk of a dangerous clash between investigators and the islanders was too great to justify any further attempts.

=== 2023 killing of fishermen ===
In December 2022, three fishermen were found missing after a fishing trip. Their boat has been spotted on North Sentinel Island by the local fishermen and the A&N administration, leading to the possibility of them either being stranded on the island or killed by the Sentinelese.

=== Influencers seeking internet fame ===
There is growing interest by online influencers who seek fame and notoriety by creating videos of themselves contacting uncontacted tribes. According to Survival International, several YouTubers have claimed to be planning to visit North Sentinel Island, without earnestly attempting to make the journey.

==== 2025 landing of a YouTuber ====
On March 29, 2025, a Ukrainian-American YouTuber from Arizona, Mykhailo Viktorovych Polyakov, made an unauthorised landing on the island. He did not encounter any inhabitants. He was subsequently arrested by the Indian Police Service with a view to prosecution. Indigenous rights organisation Survival International, which advocates for uncontacted peoples globally, condemned the illegal actions as "deeply disturbing", noting that uncontacted peoples like the Sentinelese are vulnerable to being wiped out by contact-induced diseases to which they have no immunity. Polyakov was reported to have left Diet Coke and a coconut as "offerings" to the people of the island. He later uploaded two videos to his YouTube channel as part of a series called "The Last Island", one was a short teaser and the other an eight-minute "Part 1". On April 21, May 22, June 17, 2026, Polyakov posted a 3-part series on his visit to the island on YouTube.

== Bibliography ==
- Goodheart, Adam (2023). The Last Island: Discovery, Defiance, and the Most Elusive Tribe on Earth. Boston: Godine. ISBN 978-1-567926828
- Hoffmann, Benjamin (2024). Sentinel Island: a Novel, translated by Alan J. Singerman, Liverpool UP. ISBN 978-1-837-642618
- Pandit, T. N. (1990). The Sentinelese. Kolkata: Seagull Books. ISBN 978-81-7046-081-7. OCLC 24438323.
- Pandya, Vishvajit (2009). In the Forest: Visual and Material Worlds of Andamanese History (1858–2006). Lanham, MD: University Press of America. ISBN 978-0-7618-4272-9.
- Vaidya, Suresh (1960). Islands of the Marigold Sun. London: Robert Hale.
- Weber, George (2005). "The Andamanese". The Lonely Islands. The Andaman Association. Archived from the original on 3 June 2013.
- Sasikumar, M. (2025). The Sentinel Islanders: The Most Isolated Tribe in the World. Brill. doi:10.1163/9789004753075. ISBN 978-90-04-75307-5.
