= Jangil =

Indigenous people of India

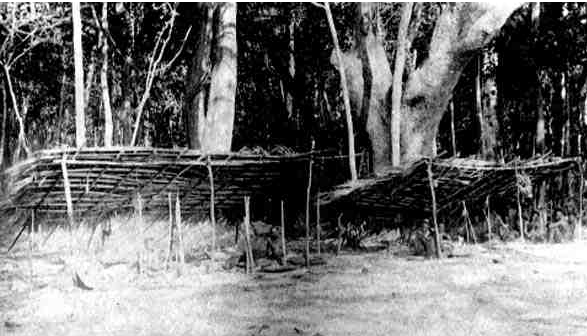
- A photograph of Jangil huts taken by Maurice Vidal Portman in the 1890s

Total population
- 0

Languages
- Jangil

Religion
- Animism

Related ethnic groups
- Other Andamanese peoples, especially Jarawas

The Jangil (also Rutland Jarawa or Rutland Onge) were one of the Indigenous peoples of the Andaman Islands in India. They lived in the interior of Rutland Island, and were given the name Rutland Jarawa because it was supposed that they were related to the neighboring Jarawa people.

Very little information about the Jangil community is known and they are believed to have become extinct sometime in the early 1900s.

== Terminology ==
An issue in evaluating the classification and history of the Jangil is the inconsistent terminology used to refer to the Andamanese tribes. Specifically, the words "Jarawa" and "Onge" were often used interchangeably between the 19th century and the 1930s, so the identity of the "Rutland Jarawa" reported during this time period is not clear.

Abbi (2008) and Kumar (2012) classify the Jarawa, Onge, Sentinelese, and Jangil people under the label "Onge-Jarawa." The 1931 census of India refers to these four tribes as "clans" of Jarawa, with Jangil being described as "a fourth clan of Jarawas of which nothing has been seen since 1907."

A Great Andamanese legend about how their ancestors discovered fire used the word "Jangil" to refer to their ancestors. One of the Great Andamanese subtribes, the Aka-Bea, referred to the Jarawa of South Andaman as "Jangil." Portman (1914) suggested that the Aka-Bea used this word because they "may have regarded the tribe as resembling their ancestors in their customs."

== Culture and contact ==
Ever since the Jangil were first encountered and documented in the mid-19th century, direct contacts with them remained scarce and they generally sought to avoid such encounters. There are only a few reported instances where outsiders (the British and Indian settlers) encountered individuals from the group, the last such case being in 1907. Expeditions sent to the interior of the island in the 1920s failed to find any signs of current habitation. Their disappearance and extinction were most likely the result of introduced diseases to which they had no natural immunity.

A picture taken in the 1890s depicted Jangil huts that resembled those of the Sentinelese and Onge, but not of the Great Andamanese or Jarawa. No photographs of Jangil individuals are known to exist.

== Language ==
Jangil
- (unattested)
- Native to: India
- Region: Rutland Island
- Ethnicity: Jangil
- Extinct: by 1931
- Language family: Ongan (presumed): Jangil–Jarawa?; Jangil

Language codes
- ISO 639-3: None (mis)
- Glottolog: None
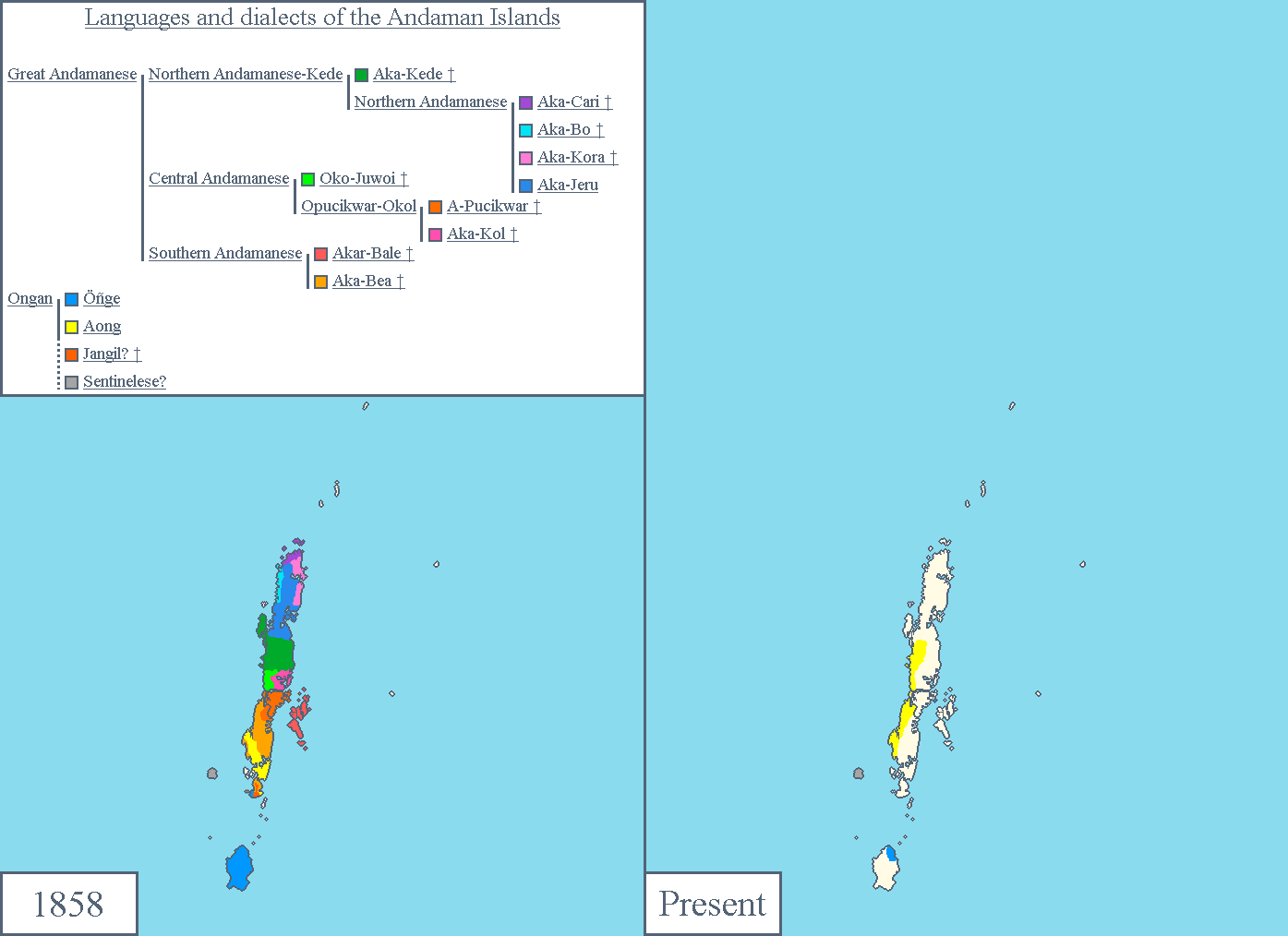
- The distributions of different Andamanese peoples, languages, and dialects at the time of British contact compared to the present-day.

The Jangil language is unattested and therefore technically unclassifiable.

British naval officer Maurice Vidal Portman made contact with a captured Jangil man named Habia in July 1884. Habia spoke a language that was distinct from, but similar to, Jarawa. Portman suggested that Jangil and Jarawa most likely descended from the same original proto-language.
