= Sentinelese language =

Unclassified language of the Sentinelese

Sentinelese
- (unattested)
- Native to: India
- Region: North Sentinel Island, southwest of the Andaman and Nicobar Islands
- Ethnicity: Sentinelese
- Native speakers: ~39–400 (2018)
- Language family: unclassified (Ongan?)

Language codes
- ISO 639-3: std
- Glottolog: sent1241
- ELP: Sentinel
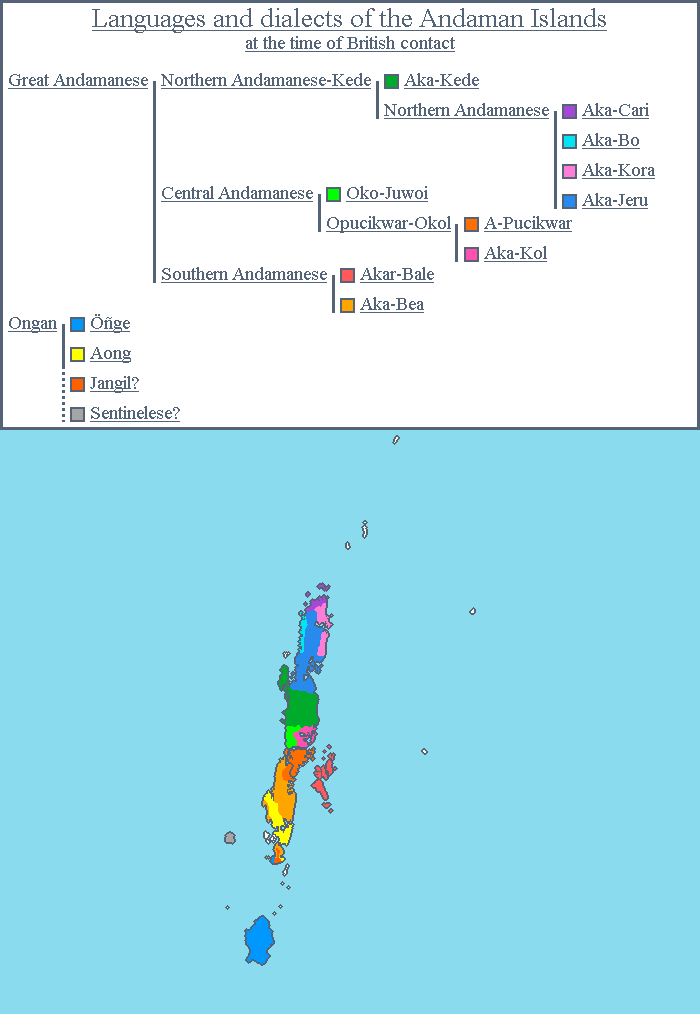
- North Sentinel Island, the small grey island to the southwest, shown in the context of the other Andamanese languages

- Location in the Bay of Bengal
- Coordinates: 11.55°N 92.25°E

Sentinelese is the undescribed language of the Sentinelese people of North Sentinel Island in the Andaman and Nicobar Islands, India. Due to the lack of contact between the Sentinelese people and the rest of the world, essentially nothing is known of their language.

== Classification ==
It is presumed that the islanders speak a single language and that it is a member of one of the Andamanese language families. Based on what little is known about similarities in culture and technology and their geographical proximity, it is supposed that their language is related to the Ongan languages, such as Jarawa, rather than to Great Andamanese. On the documented occasions when Onge-speaking individuals were taken to North Sentinel Island to attempt communication, they were unable to recognise any of the language spoken by the inhabitants. Maurice Vidal Portman, a British naval officer who visited North Sentinel Island, recorded that one of his Onge companions—an individual named Tomiti—claimed that the Sentinelese spoke an entirely different language unintelligible to him. However, the anthropologist Triloknath Pandit claimed that his Onge companions "reacted perceptibly to every hostile gesture and speech of the Sentinelese warriors," which—according to Pandit—implied that they had either understood or "sensed" the meaning of the Sentinelese imprecations. It has also been recorded that the Jarawa and Sentinelese languages are mutually unintelligible.

== Status ==
Sentinelese is classified as an endangered language due to a highly likely small number of speakers, matching the unknown population of the island, which has been estimated at anywhere from 100 to 250; an estimate by the Indian government is 100.

== Phonology ==
John Allen Chau, an American missionary who illegally visited North Sentinel Island in 2018, wrote in his notes that the language supposedly had a "lot of high pitched sounds like ba, pa, la, and as."

== Vocabulary ==
No words of the Sentinelese language are known with certainty. However, one personal name is tentatively attested: Dāūwacho-chégálé-bāī, recorded by Maurice Portman as belonging to a Sentinelese man who "had, some years before, left the North Sentinel in a canoe and come across, via Rutland Island, to the Cinque Islands and the Little Andaman." If the man was indeed from the island, and the attestation reflects his original Sentinelese name, it may represent an attestation of Sentinelese. His name is phonetically comparable to names of Onge individuals who were also transcribed by Portman (e.g. Dauwetau-Ti-Tetale-Tange).

Further possible lexical information was provided in 2020 by Indian anthropologist Dr. M. Sreenathan, a member of the party who made brief contact on the island in the 1990s. He describes the Sentinelese shouting liya and luwa while gathering coconuts from the contact party, which he postulates means 'near' and 'far' respectively, on the basis of comparable words in Jarawa. Other words transcribed by Sreenathan include məəŋə məəŋɖa, əc ale, ʈ/ɖaŋ, ɖaik, kayə, tu aɖe, pila and iŋ.' Indian anthropologist Madhumala Chattopadhyay said that, while attempting to perform a gift-exchange with the Sentinelese, she heard shouts of nariyali jaba jaba, which supposedly meant "more coconuts."
