= Dāūwacho-chégálé-bāī =

Only recorded Sentinelese individual in history

- Born: 19th century North Sentinel Island, Andaman and Nicobar Islands, British India
- Died: 20th century Andaman Islands
- Known for: Only named Sentinelese individual recorded in history

Dāūwacho-chégálé-bāī is the name of an Andamanese man who may have been born on North Sentinel Island, making him the only known named individual from North Sentinel Island. He is briefly attested in the writings of British naval officer Maurice Vidal Portman.

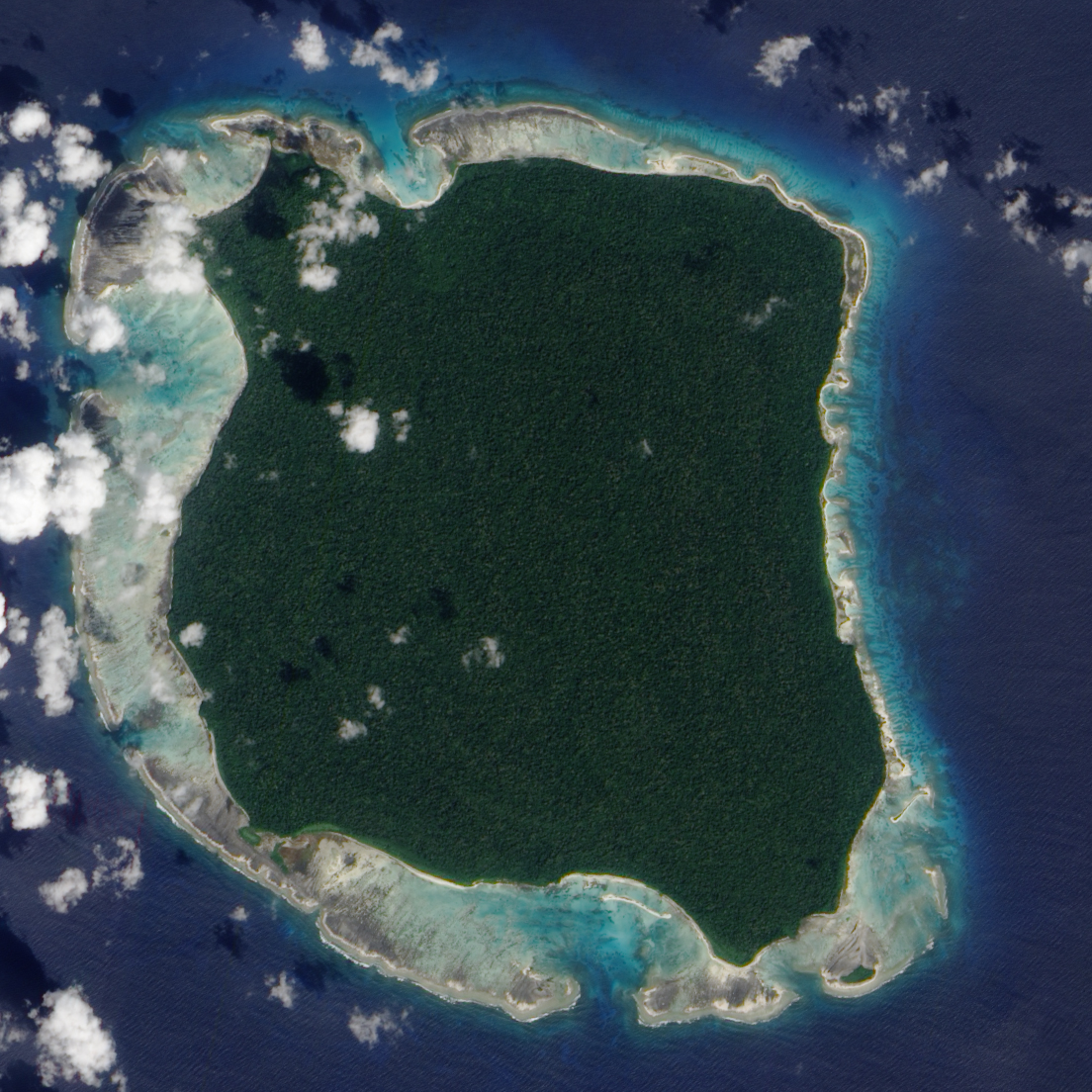
An aerial view of North Sentinel Island, the home of the uncontacted Sentinelese and the birthplace of Dāūwacho-chégálé-bāī'.

== Biography ==
In the 1890s, Dāūwacho-chégálé-bāī resided in the village of Támbe-Ébui, on the northeast coast of Little Andaman. He was supposedly born on North Sentinel Island, and may have drifted away by accident, likely after a tropical storm pushed his canoe beyond the shallow coastal reefs and into the open waters of the Bay of Bengal, where traditional punting poles could not be used to get back to the island.

His canoe drifted south until it landed on the shores of first Rutland Island, then the Cinque Islands and Little Andaman. The area was home to the Önge tribe, another indigenous tribe.

It is not known whether his name is of Sentinelese origin; phonetically comparable names of Onge individuals are also transcribed by Portman (e.g. Dauwetau-Ti-Tetale-Tange).

=== British contact and return attempt ===
In 1895, Maurice Vidal Portman, a British naval officer, located Dāūwacho-chégálé-bāī living with the Önge at a camp in the Cinque islands, and attempted to use him to establish contact with the Sentinelese. He was placed aboard a British ship and transported back to North Sentinel Island. Upon arrival, Dāūwacho-chégálé-bāī called out to a group of Sentinelese, but "they showed the usual signs of fright and hostility", and closer contact was not made.

== See also ==
- North Sentinel Island
- Sentinelese
- Maurice Vidal Portman
