= Anvita Abbi =

Indian linguist and scholar

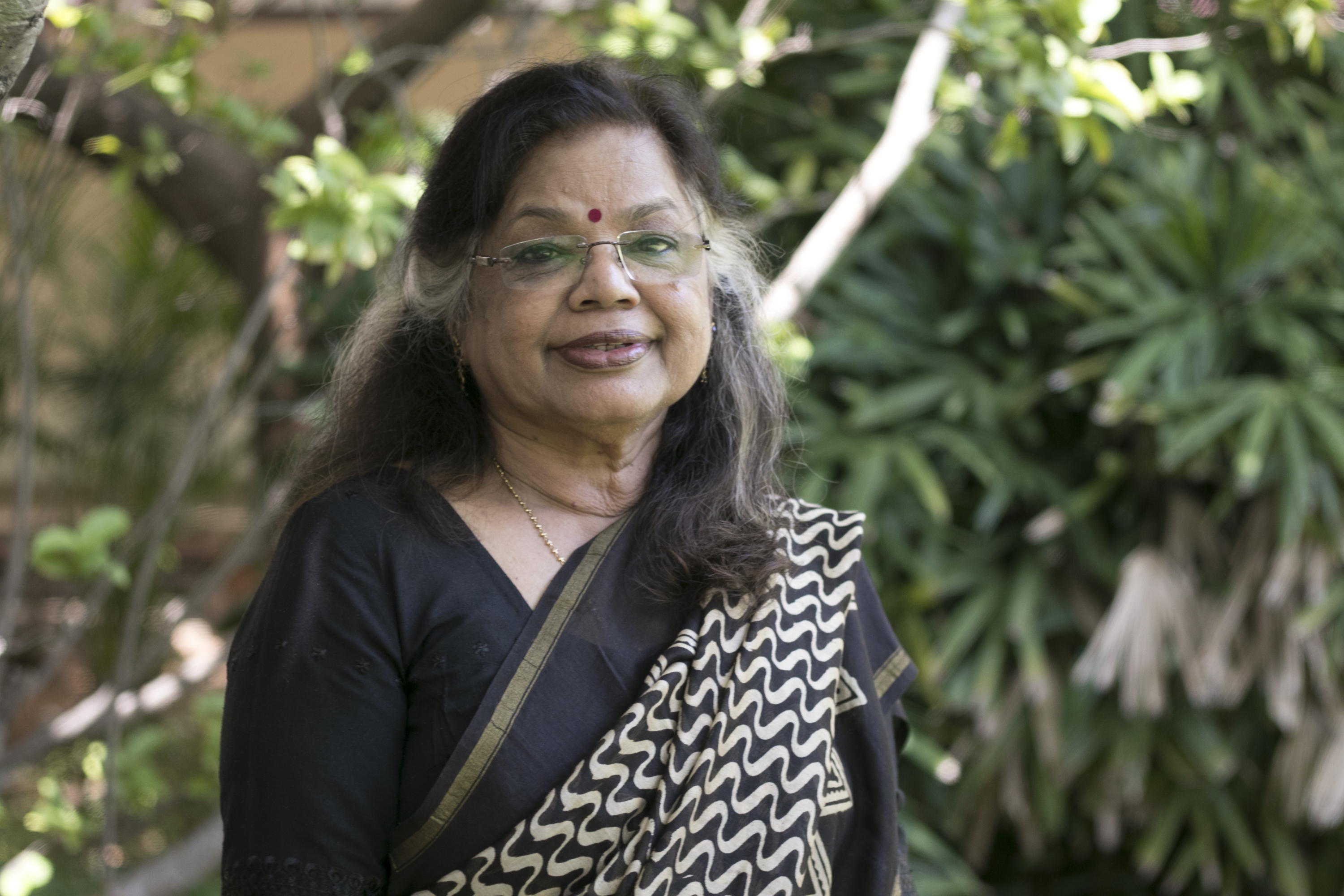
- Abbi at Indian Institute of Technology Madras.
- Born: 9 January 1949 (age 77); Agra, United Provinces, Dominion of India
- Occupations: Scholar and linguist
- Awards: Padma Shri; Rashtriya Lok Bhasha Sammaan; All India Institute of Advanced Study Fellowship; Gold Medal - Delhi University; SOAS Leverhume Professor; Max Planck Institute Visiting Scientist; Kenneth Hale Award - Linguistic Society of America (2015)
- Website: www.andamanese.net

Anvita Abbi (born 9 January 1949) is an Indian linguist and scholar of minority languages, known for her studies on tribal languages and other minority languages of South Asia. In 2013, she was honoured with the Padma Shri, the fourth highest civilian award by the Government of India for her contributions to the field of linguistics.

== Biography ==
Anvita Abbi was born on 9 January 1949, in Agra to a family that had produced a number of Hindi writers. After schooling at local institutions, she graduated in economics (BA Hons) from the University of Delhi in 1968. Subsequently, she secured a master's degree (MA) in linguistics from the same university with first division and first rank in 1970 and continued her studies to obtain a PhD from Cornell University, Ithaca, USA, in 1975, with a major in General Linguistics and minor in South Asian Linguistics. She worked as professor of linguistics at Centre for Linguistics, School of Language, Literature and Culture Studies. She currently lives in New Delhi.

== Legacy ==
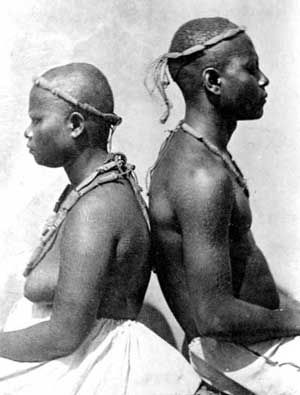
Great Andamanese couple - an 1876 photograph

Anvita Abbi is credited with extensive research on the six language families in India and the languages and culture of the Great Andamanese which she did as a part of the Endangered Languages Documentation Project (ELDP) project on Vanishing Voices of the Great Andamanese (VOGA), SOAS, University of London. Her studies of 2003-2004 have helped in identifying the distinct characteristics of two Great Andamanese languages, Jarawa and Onge which promoted the concept of a sixth language family of India. Later researches on Andamanese people by other scholars have reported to have confirmed Abbi's findings by discovering two distinct haplogroups of the region, viz. M31 and M32.

She resumed her research on the topic in 2006, concentrating on the morpho-syntax and lexicon of three dying languages of Andaman Islands and unearthed evidence proving that Great Andamanese belongs to a linguistically different language family. She has also compiled an English-Great Andamanese-Hindi Dictionary. Her current project covers the grammar and the evolution of Great Andamanese languages and its people.

A teacher at the JNU, Abbi has assisted 20 PhD and 29 MPhil students in their researches.

== Positions ==
Abbi has held many positions of importance, both at administrative and academic levels. Current position: Director, Center of Oral and Tribal Literature Sahtiya Akademi, New Delhi India. Adjunct Professor, Simon Fraser University, British Columbia, Vancouver, Canada and the President of the Linguistic society of India. She has served as an advisor to institutions such as UNESCO (since 2002) and Sahitya Akademi. He is a / She is a life member of the Linguistic Society of India at their Dravidian Linguistics Association wing and has also sat on the editorial board of two journals, Indian Linguistics (1991–95) and the International Journal of Dravidian Linguistics (1992–96).

The list of academic and organizational responsibilities Professor Anvita Abbi has carried out may be listed as:

- Chairperson, Centre of Linguistics and English, Jawaharlal Nehru University, New Delhi - 1995-97 and since 2007
- Proctor - Jawaharlal Nehru University
- Member of the University Grants Commission (UGC) Review Committee- 1996
- Member - Advisory Committee - Central Institute of Indian Languages, Mysore - Ministry of Human Resource Development, India - 1996 & 1999
- Member - Advisory Board - Sahitya Akademi for Bhasha Samman awards in Tribal and Lesser known languages - since 2002
- Advisor - Linguapax Institute, UNESCO, since 2000
- Member - Board of Directors - Terralingua, Washington DC, US - 1998, 2001-2004 and 2004–2006.
- Member - Review Committee - Dravidian University, Kuppam, Andhra Pradesh - 2006
- External member - Centre of German Studies - Jawaharlal Nehru University - 1990–2002
- External member - Centre of East Asian Studies - Jawaharlal Nehru University - 1990–2002
- External member - Centre of French studies - Jawaharlal Nehru University - 1990–2002
- Member - Governing body - Daulat Ram College - 1995–2001
- Member - Advisory Board - International University of Hindi, Wardha - 1998–2000
- External Member - Faculty of Arts, University of Delhi, Delhi - 1995–2000
- Member - Bifurcation Committee - Centre of Afro-Asian Studies
- Member - Academic Council - Jawaharlal Nehru University - 1995–1997
- Member - Telecommunication Committee - Jawaharlal Nehru University - 1995–1996
- Member - Equivalence Committee - Jawaharlal Nehru University - 1986–1988
- President - Music Society - Jawaharlal Nehru University - 1982–1986
- Advisor - Konkani Survey - Konkani Academy, Goa - 1991–1992
- Advisor - Post Graduate Hindi Linguistics Courses - University of Delhi - 1991–1992
- Director - South Asia Media Centre - Kansas State University, Kansas - 1975–76
- Member - Advisory Board - Sahitya Akademi for (Classical Language selection)

== Professional assignments and memberships ==
Abbi has been invited by several universities around the world as visiting professor. She has taught at the following universities:

- Kansas State University - 1986
- Advanced Centre of Linguistics, Osmania University, Hyderabad - 1990
- South Asia Institute, University of Heidelberg, Heidelberg - 1998
- United Nations Educational, Scientific and Cultural Organization (UNESCO), the Basque country, Spain - 2000
- Cornell University
- Syracuse University
- University of Illinois
- University of Texas
- University of California, Berkeley campus
- University of California, Santa Barbara campus
- Ohio State University, Columbus
- Rutgers University, New Jersey
- Stuttgart University
- Max Planck Institute
- University of Heidelberg, Germany
- University of Toulouse, France
- University of Vitoria Gasteiz, The Basque Country, Spain
- Universitas Bung Hatta, Padang, Indonesia
- Kobe University, Japan

Anvita Abbi, an honorary life member of the Linguistic Society of America and the Dravidian Linguistics Association, sits on the advisory board of Terralingua and the UNESCO. She has also served as a Director Board member of Terralingua during 1998–2008.

== Lectures ==
Anvita Abbi has presented papers and delivered keynote addresses at various platforms and at many institutions of repute. A selection of her lectures are:

Venue	Date	Topic	Country
Cairns Institute, James Cook University	8 November 2010	The endangered languages of the Andaman Islands: Reconstructing the knowledge-base of the Pre Neolithic tribes of India	Australia
Cairns Institute, James Cook University	11 January 2011	Semantics of inalienability and grammaticalization of body part terms in Great Andamanese	Australia
Max Planck Institute of Evolutionary Anthropology	18 September 2010	In search of language contact between Jarawa and Aka-Bea: the languages of South Andaman	Germany
University of Würzburg	1 July 2010	Contact language in Northeast India	Germany
University of Oslo	23 September 2010	Hindi as a contact language of India	Norway

== Publications ==
Anvita Abbi is credited with 19 books, authored, coauthored and edited. Her writings cover the typology, structures and ethnolinguistic aspects of languages and their documentation. Her work has spanned the entire Indian subcontinent and the most known among her works is her project, Vanishing Voices of the Great Andamanese.

- Endangered Languages of the Andaman Islands
- A Manual of Linguistic Fieldwork and Structures of Indian Languages
- Language Structure and Language Dynamics in South Asia (Select papers from the SALA XVIII)
- Languages of Tribal and Indigenous Peoples of India. The Ethnic Space
- Language and The State. Perspectives on the Eighth Schedule
- Semantic Universals in Indian Languages
- India as a Linguistic Area Revisited
- Reduplication in South Asian Languages. An Areal, Topological and Historical Study
- Studies in Bilingualism
- Semantic Theories and Language Teaching
- Semantic Grammar of Hindi. A Study of Reduplication
- A Dictionary of the Great Andamanese Language: English-Great Andamanese-Hindi
- A Grammar of the Great Andamanese Language. An Ethnolinguistic Study. 2013. Brill Publications. Leiden. ISBN 978-90-04-23527-4 (hardback); 978-90-04-24612-6
- Unwritten Languages of India (edited) 2017. Sahitya Akademi Publications, Delhi. ISBN 978-81-260-5266-0

Her Hindi short story anthology, Mutthhi Bhar Pahcaan, was published in 1969.

- Mutthhi Bhar Pahcaan (A Handful of Recognition). A collection of short stories 1969. Radhakrishan Prakashan, Delhi.

Anvita Abbi has also published over 80 articles in national and international peer-reviewed journals. Some of her notable articles are:

- Vanishing Voices of the Great Andamanese (VOGA)
- Universal Grammar, Language Evolution, and Documenting an Ancient Language. Language Documentation and Linguistic Theory
- Is Great Andamanese genealogically and typologically distinct from Onge and Jarawa?

== Awards and recognitions ==
Anvita Abbi has been honoured by several institutions and establishments. She has held the position of the Visiting Scientist at the Max Planck Institute of Evolutionary Anthropology, Leipzig, Germany for three years, 200, 2003 and 2010. She was a Leverhume Professor at the SOAS, University of London in 2011 and a fellow of Humanities and Social Sciences at the Cornell University, New York, US in 1990 and a visiting fellow of the La Trobe University, Melbourne in 2003. Abbi was a visiting professor at the Cairns Institute, James Cook University, Australia during 2010–2011. Some of the other honours she has received are:

- Kenneth Hale Award by the Linguistic Society of America. 'For outstanding lifetime contributions to the documentation and description of languages of India, with particular note of her extraordinary contributions to the documentation of the Great Andamanese language, a moribund language that is a key isolate in understanding the peopling of Asia and Oceania.' 2015.
- Rashtriya Lok Bhasha Sammaan - Gandhi Hindustani Sahitya Sabha - 2003
- Fellowship - All India Institute of Advanced Study, Shimla - 2001
- Gold Medal - Delhi University - 1970

In 2013, the Government of India honoured Anvita Abbi by awarding her the civilian award of Padma Shri.

== See also ==
- Great Andamanese people
- Jarawa language (Andaman Islands)
- Önge language
- Lists of endangered languages
