= Triloknath Pandit =

Indian anthropologist

- Born: 1934 (age 91–92); Srinagar, Jammu and Kashmir, British India
- Other name: T.N. Pandit
- Education: University of Kashmir (BS); University of Delhi (MS)
- Occupation: Anthropologist
- Known for: North Sentinel Island survey

Triloknath Pandit (born 1934) is an Indian anthropologist. He was the first professional anthropologist to land on North Sentinel Island in 1967, leading to the first friendly contact with the Sentinelese on 4 January 1991.

== Early life and education ==
Trilok Nath Pandit was born in 1934 in Srinagar, in the princely state of Jammu and Kashmir in British India into a Kashmiri Pandit family. His father was a professor at the University of Kashmir. He studied science at the University of Kashmir and earned a Master of Science degree in Anthropology at the University of Delhi.

== Career ==
In 1967, Pandit was given the task to lead an expedition to North Sentinel Island by the governor of the Andaman and Nicobar Islands. The expeditions were initially met with a hostile response: the Sentinelese hid in the jungle and shot arrows at him and his crew on later trips. For 24 years, Pandit and his team brought a variety of gifts and offerings that eventually led to the first friendly contact in 1991. He was head of the Andaman & Nicobar Regional Centre of the Anthropological Survey of India.

== Works ==
- Pandit, T. N. (1985). The Tribal and Non-Tribal in Andaman Islands: A historical perspective. Journal of the Indian Anthropological Society 20:111-131.
- Pandit, T. N. (1990). The Sentinelese. Kolkata: Seagull Books.
- Pandit, T. N. & Chattopadhyay, M. (1989). Meeting the Sentinel Islanders: The Least Known of the Andaman Hunter-Gatherers. Journal of the Indian Anthropological Society 24:169-178.
