= Ongan languages =

Family of two Andamanese languages

Ongan
- Jarawa–Onge
- Geographic distribution: Andaman Islands
- Linguistic classification: One of the world's primary language families
- Proto-language: Proto-Ongan
- Subdivisions: Önge; Jarawa; ?Jangil †; ?Sentinelese

Language codes
- Glottolog: jara1244
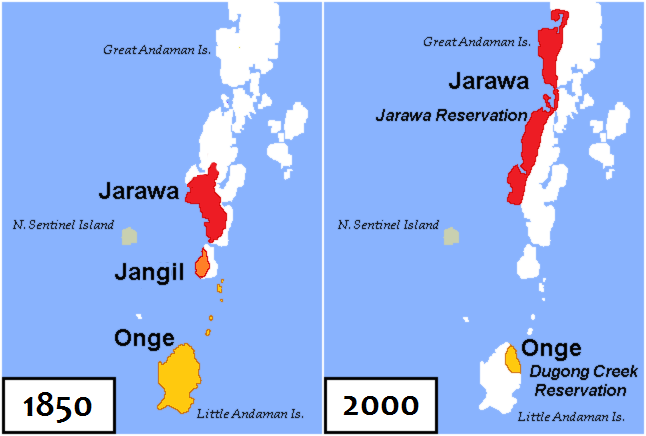
- Distribution of the Ongan languages prior to 1850 (Fig. 1) and in 2005 (Fig. 2)

Ongan, also called Angan, Jarawa–Onge, or ambiguously South Andamanese, is a language family which comprises two attested Andamanese languages spoken in the southern Andaman Islands.

The two known extant languages are:

- Önge or Onge (⟨ö⟩ transcribes /ə/); 96 speakers (Onge) in 1997, mostly monolingual
- Jarawa or Järawa; estimated at 200 speakers (Jarawa) in 1997, monolingual

The extinct language of the Jangil and that of the uncontacted Sentinelese may be Ongan, but there is no linguistic information for either of them.

The label 'Southern Andamanese languages' is also used for the closely related southern pair of the Great Andamanese languages.

== External relationships ==
The attested Andamanese languages fall into two clear families, Great Andamanese and Ongan.

The similarities between Great Andamanese and Ongan are mainly of a typological and morphological nature, with little demonstrated common vocabulary. Linguists, including long-range researchers such as Joseph Greenberg, have expressed doubts as to the validity of Andamanese as a family.

It has since been proposed (by Juliette Blevins 2007) that Ongan (but not Great Andamanese) is distantly related to Austronesian in a family called Austronesian–Ongan. However, the proposal of a genealogical connection between Austronesian and Ongan has not been well-received by other linguists. George Van Driem (2011) considers Blevins' evidence as "not compelling", although he leaves the possibility open that some resemblances could be the result of contact/borrowing, a position also held by Hoogervorst (2012). Robert Blust (2014) argues that Blevins' conclusions are not supported by her data, and that of her first 25 reconstructions, none are reproducible using the comparative method. Blust concludes that the grammatical comparison does not hold up, and also cites non-linguistic (such as cultural, archaeological, and biological) evidence against Blevins' hypothesis.

== Reconstruction ==
Proto-Ongan
- Reconstruction of: Ongan languages

The two attested Ongan languages are relatively close, and the historical sound reconstruction mostly straightforward:

Proto-Ongan consonant correspondences
Proto-Ongan	*p	*b	*t	*d	*kʷ	*k	*ɡ	*j	*w	*c	*ɟ	*m	*n	*ɲ	*ŋ	*l	*r
Jarawa	p, b	b	t	d	hʷ, h	h	ɡ, j	j	w	c	ɟ	m	n	ɲ	ŋ	l	r
Onge	b	b	t, d	d, r	kʷ, h	k, ɡ	ɡ, Ø	j	w	c, ɟ	ɟ	m	n	ɲ	ŋ	l, j	r/j/l, Ø

Proto-Ongan vowel correspondences in open nonfinal syllables
Proto-Ongan	*i	*u	*a	*e	*o	(*ə)
Jarawa	i	u	a	e, ə, o	o	(ə)
Onge	i	u	a	e, ə, o	o	(ə)

*ə appears to be allophonic for *e before a nasal coda.

== Grammar ==
The Ongan languages are agglutinative, with an extensive prefix and suffix system. They have a noun class system based largely on body parts, in which every noun and adjective may take a prefix according to which body part it is associated with (on the basis of shape, or functional association). Another peculiarity of terms for body parts is that they are inalienably possessed, requiring a possessive adjective prefix to complete them, so one cannot say "head" alone, but only "my, or his, or your, etc. head".

The Ongan pronouns are here represented by Önge:

I, my	m-	we, our	et-, ot-
thou, thy	ŋ-	you, your	n-
he, his, she, her, it, its	g-	they, their	ekw-, ek-, ok-

There is also an indefinite prefix ən-, on- "someone's". Jarawa does not have the plural series, but the singular is very close: m-, ŋ- or n-, w-, ən-. From this, Blevins reconstructs Proto-Ongan *m-, *ŋ-, *gw-, *en-.

Judging from the available sources, the Andamanese languages have only two cardinal numbers: one and two and their entire numerical lexicon is one, two, one more, some more, and all.

== See also ==
- List of Proto-Ongan reconstructions (Wiktionary)
