= Jarawa language (Andaman Islands) =

Language of India

Jarawa
- Aong ॳङ्
- Pronunciation: [əŋ]
- Native to: India
- Region: Andaman Islands; interior and south central Rutland island, central interior and south interior of South Andaman island, Middle Andaman island, west coast, 70 square km reserve.
- Ethnicity: Jarawa
- Native speakers: (266, 70% of ethnic population cited 2001–2002)
- Language family: Ongan: Jangil–Jarawa?; Jarawa
- Writing system: Unwritten, sometimes transcribed with Devanagari.

Language codes
- ISO 639-3: anq
- Glottolog: jara1245
- ELP: Jarawa

Järawa (or Jarwa, natively Aong ॳङ् IPA: [əŋ]) is one of the Ongan languages. It is spoken by the Jarawa people inhabiting the interior and south central Rutland Island, central interior, and south interior South Andaman Island, and the west coast of Middle Andaman Island.

Järawa meant "foreigners" in Aka-Bea, the now-extinct language of their traditional enemies. Like many peoples of the world, they call themselves "people" in their language, aong.

The Jarawa language of the Andaman Islands is considered vulnerable.

== History ==
Jarawa is a language used mainly by hunter-gatherer communities who live along the western coast of the Andaman Islands.

Other than having a history as traditional hunter-forager-fishermen, they also had reputations as warriors and uncompromising defenders of their territory. The Jarawas managed to survive as a tribal entity despite suffering massive population loss from outside infectious diseases to which they had no immunity.

Jarawas currently have a population of 270 remaining. Their primary threat is a highway, Andaman Trunk Road, running through their territory and reserve of 1,028 square kilometers of dense evergreen forests.

The ancestors of the Jarawa are thought to have been part of the first successful human migrations out of Africa. Today, the Andaman Islands remain diverse, and several hundred thousand Indian settlers now reside on the islands.

The language descends from a parent language known as Proto-Ongan. From within this wide range, Little Andamanese also evolved. Onge, Jarawa, and presumably Sentinelese all branched off Little Andamanese, thus sharing similar characteristics in culture and language.

== Geographic distribution ==
Jarawa is not an official language. No dialects or varieties are known to have stemmed or derived from the Jarawa language. There are two varieties of Jarawa languages. One is spoken in the northern Middle Andaman and southern Middle Andaman.

== Sounds and phonology ==
Jarawa has 41 sounds: 28 consonants and 13 vowels.

=== Vowels ===
	Front	Central	Back
Close	i		u
Close-mid	e	ɘ	o
Mid		ə	
Open		a	

The Jarawa language uses close (high), mid, and open to distinguish between the height of the vowels. For the tongue position, they characterize vowels as front, central, and back. For the position of lips, vowels are characterized as rounded or unrounded. Vowels in the language can be classified into three groups:

1. Two front vowels - [i] and [e]
2. Two back vowels - [u] and [o]
3. Three central vowels - [ɘ], [ə], and [a]

There are also 2 mid-low vowels, [ɛ] and [ɔ], but their phonemic status is not deciphered yet. Because their occurrences are very limited, it is unclear how often they are used and their status.

Length is very important in this language as they have short and long vowels.

=== Consonants ===
		Labial	Dental	Alveolar	Retroflex	Palatal	Velar		Glottal	
		Labial	Dental	Alveolar	Retroflex	Palatal	plain	lab.	plain	lab.
Nasal		m	n̪			ɲ	ŋ			
Plosive	voiceless	p	t̪		ʈ	c	k			
Plosive	voiced	b	d̪		ɖ	ɟ	ɡ			
Plosive	aspirated		t̪ʰ		ʈʰ	cʰ	kʰ	kʷʰ		
Fricative		ɸ				ʃ			h	hʷ
Trill/Flap				r	ɽ					
Approximant		w		l	(ɭ)	j				

=== Characteristics ===
Among all the 28 consonants, voiced and voiceless plosives are present along with voiceless aspirated plosives. Nasals, trills, retroflex flap, lateral and retroflex laterals all occur in this language.

There are also two approximants in the Jarawa language, these being labial and palatal, along with a few fricatives like the pharyngeal fricative and the bilabial fricative. Two labialised consonants also exist, such as the pharyngeal fricative and voiceless aspirated velar plosive.

Word-initial contrast between /p/ and /b/ is disappearing, with /p/ becoming /b/ (note that in Onge /p/ is not phonemically present).

Jarawa words are at least monosyllabic, and content words are at least bimoraic. Maximal syllables are CVC.

/c/ voices intervocalically in derived environments, /ə/ syncopates when followed by another vowel across a morpheme boundary, /ə/ becomes [o] when the next syllable has a round vowel, and whole syllables may be deleted in fast speech.

The following examples show minimal pairs.

These signify the contrast between the vowels /i/ and /u/:

- /hiɽu/ = 'black'
- /innə-gə cew/ = 'smells good'
- /hulu/ = 'hot'
- /unnə/ = 'return home'

These signify the contrast between vowel /e/ and /o/:

- /tape/ = 'moon'
- /tapo/ = 'good'

These signify the contrast between /o/ and /a/:

- /topo/ = 'snake'
- /tapo/ = 'good'

These signify the contrast between vowel /a/ and /ə/:

- /hʷawə/ = 'watercourse'
- /hʷəwə/ = 'wild boar'

== Grammar ==
=== Morphology ===
In terms of affixation, Jarawa has simple morphology as it takes prefixes and suffixes. The two kinds of prefixes are:

- One which is pronominal which attaches to verbs, adjectives, and nouns
- One which indicates definiteness or referentiality, and attaches only to verbs.

Suffixes are aimed to convey plurality when attached to nouns or express mood, modality, and evidentiality when attached to verbs. When attaching to adjectives, they may denote either state or evidentiality as well.

In Jarawa, a morpheme can be a free root which exists independently such as in the case of /napo/ meaning 'fish'. It can also be a bounded root which occurs with obligatory prefixes as in /ən-oɖə/ meaning 'hair'. Verbs such as /ən-ətəhə/ meaning 'sit' can be a bound root. In both cases, either the nominal root for 'hair' or verbal root for 'sit', cannot occur independently if they refer to human beings. A bound root must be prefixed with some morpheme.

Jarawa has been discovered to have six kinds of word classes:

- Nouns
- Verbs
- Pronouns
- Adjectives
- Adverbs
- Postposition

Nouns, verbs, adjectives and adverbs are open classes where nouns and verbs are abundant and adjectives and adverbs are few in number. Postpositions and pronouns are closed classes with a small number of lexemes. The order of number of words in each class in increasing order are as follows: postposition, pronoun, adverb, adjective, verb, and noun.

There are three kinds of pronouns: personal pronouns (pronominals), demonstrative pronouns, and interrogative pronouns. First person form of personal pronouns are 'mi', second person form is 'ŋi ~ ni ~ ən', and third person form is 'hi ~ əhi'.

=== Syntax ===
Jarawa uses two different types of clausal structures: verbless clauses where nominals or adjectives function as head of the predicate and verbal clauses where verbs are the head of the predicate, with core arguments. Both types of clauses have different morphological and syntactic structures.

In yes or no questions, all questions start with ka. The schema is presented as: ka + [subject] + [object] + [verb].

/Onəhə-le/ can either mean 'what is being done' or 'why', /ŋi onəhə-le/ means 'What are you doing?' and /ŋi onəhə-le ɖ-ic^{h}e/ means 'Why did you do that?'

== Writing system ==
The Jarawas have no system of writing. In observed designs, wavy lines would represent the sea and therefore only drawings or pictures would be drawn to communicate. CIIL, Mysore has introduced revised Devanagari and Latin scripts for the Jarawa language. The literacy rate in L1 for Jarawas is below 1%.

== Everyday usage examples ==
The following examples show common phrases and kinship terms.

=== Common phrases ===
- /mi bəɘʈʰe-jə/ : I/We are going.
- /mi omohə/ : I/We sleep.
- /mi ŋ-əjojəba/ : I saw you.

=== Kinship terms ===
- Father: /ummə/
- Mother: /kaja/
- Husband: /a:gi/
- Wife: /əŋa:p/
- Elder Sister: /a:mi/
- Elder Brother: /a:pə/
- Son/Daughter: /ajə/
- Younger brother/sister: /aikʰwaʈə/

== Bibliography ==
- Abbi, Anvita (2013). A Grammar of the Great Andamanese Language. Brill's Studies in South and Southwest Asian Languages. Vol. 4. Leiden: Brill. ISBN 978-90-04-23527-4.
- "Jarawa" (PDF). Database for Indigenous Cultural Evolution. University of Missouri.
- Kumar, Pramod (2012). Descriptive and typological study of Jarawa (PhD thesis). Jawaharlal Nehru University. S2CID 60302041.
- Sreenathan, M.; Rao, V. R.; Bednarik, R. G. (2008). "Palaeolithic Cognitive Inheritance in Aesthetic Behavior of the Jarawas of the Andaman Islands". Anthropos. 103 (2): 367–392. doi:10.5771/0257-9774-2008-2-367. JSTOR 40467418.
- Zide, Norman; Pandya, Vishvajit (October 1989). "A Bibliographical Introduction to Andamanese Linguistics". Journal of the American Oriental Society. 109 (4): 639–651. doi:10.2307/604090. JSTOR 604090.
