= Rutland Island =

Island

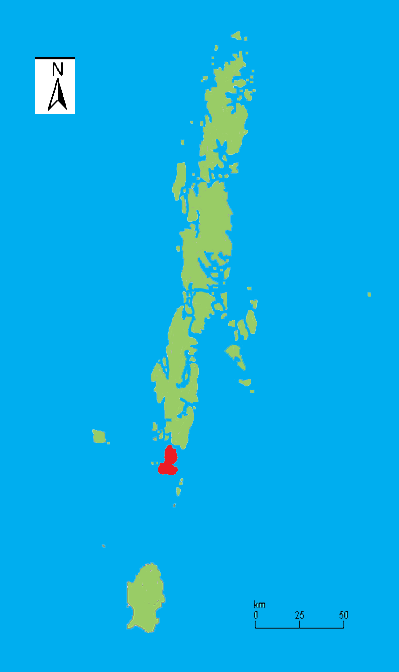
- Outline map of the Andaman Islands, with the location of Rutland Island highlighted

- Location within Andaman and Nicobar Islands

Geography
- Location: Bay of Bengal
- Coordinates: 11.42°N 92.64°E
- Archipelago: Andaman Islands
- Adjacent to: Indian Ocean
- Total islands: 1
- Major islands: Rutland
- Area: 121.5 km^{2} (46.9 sq mi)
- Length: 18 km (11.2 mi)
- Width: 11 km (6.8 mi)
- Coastline: 69 km (42.9 mi)
- Highest elevation: 433 m (1421 ft)
- Highest point: Mount Ford

Administration
- India
- District: South Andaman
- Island group: Andaman Islands
- Island sub-group: Rutland Archipelago
- Tehsil: Port Blair Tehsil
- Largest settlement: Bada Khari (pop. 169)

Demographics
- Population: 347 (2016)
- Pop. density: 2.85/km^{2} (7.38/sq mi)
- Ethnic groups: Hindu, Andamanese

Additional information
- Time zone: IST (UTC+5:30)
- PIN: 744105
- Telephone code: 031927
- ISO code: IN-AN-00
- Official website: www.and.nic.in
- Literacy: 64%
- Avg. summer temperature: 30.2 °C (86.4 °F)
- Avg. winter temperature: 23.0 °C (73.4 °F)
- Sex ratio: 1.48♂/♀
- Census Code: 35.639.0004
- Official Languages: Hindi, English

Rutland Island is an island of the Andaman Islands. It belongs to the South Andaman administrative district, part of the Indian union territory of Andaman and Nicobar Islands. The island is located 20 km (12 mi) south from Port Blair.

== History ==
The island used to be home to the Jangil, one of the indigenous Andamanese groups. The Jangil (also called "Rutland Jarawa" since they were thought to have been related to the Jarawa of South Andaman) occupied much of the interior of the island according to mid-19th century British accounts; however, their interactions with outsiders were few and far between. Up to the early 20th century there are only a handful of documented encounters with Jangil individuals. The last documented encounter was in 1907, and when in the 1920s a more extensive expedition to the island's interior was conducted, no traces of their active habitation were found; the Jangil had become extinct.

From time to time other indigenous Andamanese, such as the Onge from Little Andaman Island to the south and Great Andamanese tribes to the north had also set up fishing communities on Rutland. However, with the great reduction in numbers of these peoples, and their (enforced) relocation to more restricted areas, the island no longer has any permanent indigenous settlement. There is a lighthouse at the slopes of the hill on the north of the island, about 2 km from the landing point.

== Geography ==
The island belongs to the Rutland Archipelago and is located across the Macpherson Strait from South Andaman Island. It is separated from Little Andaman by the Duncan Passage, and from North Clinque Island by Manner Strait. Mount Ford, 433m high, lies in the N part of the island; Mount Mayo, 227m high, lies in the S part.

== Administration ==
Politically, Rutland Island, along neighboring Rutland Archipelago, are part of Port Blair Taluk.

== Demographics ==
There are 6 villages on the island: Rutland village, R.M.Point village, Bamboo Nallaha, Kichad Nallaha, Bada Khari and Dani Nallah.

According to the 2011 census of India, the island has 119 households, with 347 inhabitants, speaking Hindi, Bengali, Tamil. The effective literacy rate is 64%.

Demographics (2011 Census)
	Total	Male	Female
Population	347	207	140
Children aged below 6 years	30	11	19
Scheduled caste	0	0	0
Scheduled tribe	2	2	0
Literates	221	144	77
Workers (all)	217	167	50
Main workers (total)	195	152	43

The island has 53 hectares of cultivated land, 237 cattle heads, 157 goats.

== Flora and fauna ==
Rutland Island is rich in marine life with the shallow waters near the island having a good representation of smaller fish and coral.The vegetation of Rutland Island is similar to that of North Sentinel Island with dry sandy soils. Although hilly, the island is overgrown with fairly open jungle and brush.

== Tourism ==
Rutland Island offers an ideal base for training open water divers. Prominent tourist spots on the island include Jahaji Beach, Bada Balu, Manner Strait, Photo Nallah and Dani Nallah.

== Rutland Water Project ==
As of 2012, the Andaman Public Works Department was planning to bring water from Rutland Island to Port Blair by underwater pipeline across Mac Pherson Strait, from R. M. Point to Phongibalu in South Andaman. The pipeline would be about 1.2 km long; the maximum depth of the strait at the planned location is 55 m. The pipeline was estimated to cost about 140 million rupees.
