= Jarawas (Andaman Islands) =

Indigenous Andamanese people in India

Aong

Total population
- ≈ 380 (2011, census)

Regions with significant populations
- Western side of South Andaman and Middle Andaman Islands, India

Languages
- Jarawa, one of the Ongan languages

Religion
- Traditional religion

Related ethnic groups
- Other indigenous Andamanese peoples, particularly Onge

The Jarawas (Jarawa: Aong, pronounced [əŋ]) are an indigenous people of the Andaman Islands in India. They live in parts of South Andaman and Middle Andaman Islands, and their present numbers are estimated at between 250 and 400 individuals. They have largely shunned interaction with outsiders, and many particulars of their society, culture and traditions are poorly understood. Since the 1990s, contacts between Jarawa groups and outsiders has grown increasingly frequent. By the 2000s, some Jarawas had become regular visitors at settlements, where they trade, interact with tourists, get medical aid, and even send their children to school.

The Jarawas are recognised as an Adivasi group in India. Along with other indigenous Andamanese peoples, they have inhabited the islands for several thousand years. The Andaman Islands have been known to outsiders since antiquity; however, until quite recent times they were infrequently visited, and such contacts were predominantly sporadic and temporary. For the greater portion of their history their only significant contact has been with other Andamanese groups.

There is some indication that the Jarawa regarded the now-extinct Jangil tribe as a parent tribe from which they split centuries or millennia ago, even though the Jarawa outnumbered (and eventually out-survived) the Jangil. The Jangil (also called the Rutland Island Aka Bea) were presumed extinct by 1931.

The Jarawa are a designated Scheduled Tribe in India.

== Origin ==
The Jarawas are believed to be descendants of the Jangil tribe and it is estimated that they have been in the Andaman Islands for over two millennia. The Jarawas were both linguistically and culturally distinguished from the Greater Andamanese, who today number 59 individuals living on Strait Island. The early colonisations by the Jarawas showed evidence that there was an early movement of humans through southern Asia and indicate that phenotypic similarities with African groups are convergent. They are also believed to be the first successful tribe to move out of Africa. Any form of evidence on the Jarawas—social, cultural, historical, archaeological, linguistic, phenotypic, and genetic—support the conclusion that the Andaman Islanders have been isolated for a substantial period of time, which suggests why they have been able to survive despite modernization.

The Jarawas are one of the four surviving tribes in the area, the others being Great Andamanese, Sentinelese and Onge. This triad is connected with the Greater Andamanese language clade on a typological—rather than a cognatic—basis, suggesting a historical separation of considerable depth.

== Contact, settlements and dislocation ==
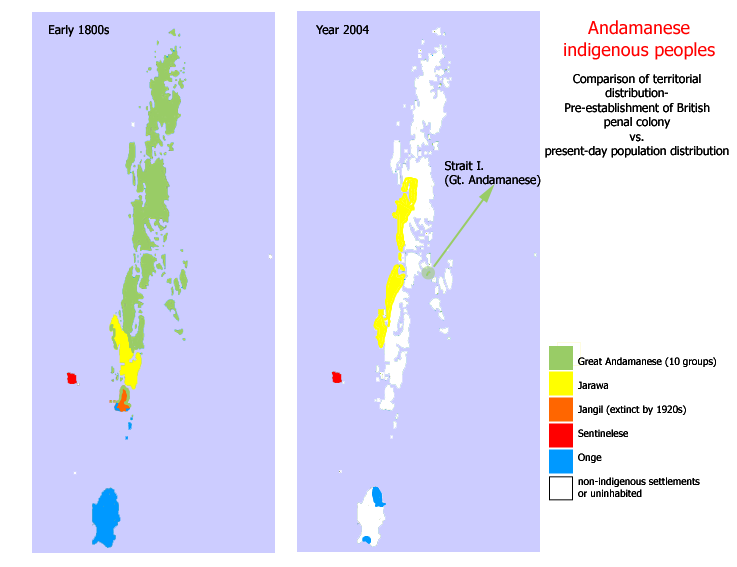
Comparative map showing distributions of various Andamanese tribes in the Andaman Islands – early 1800s versus present-day (2004). Notables: 1. Rapid depopulation of the original southeastern Jarawa homeland in the 1789–1793 period; 2. Onge and Great Andamanese shrinkage to isolated settlements; 3. Complete Jangil extinction by 1931; 4. Jarawa move to occupy depopulated former west coast homeland of the Great Andamanese; 5. Only the Sentinelese zone is somewhat intact

The Jarawas have a history as traditional hunter-forager-fishermen, and have also had reputations as warriors and uncompromising defenders of their territory. Before the 19th century, the Jarawa homelands were located in the southeast part of South Andaman Island and nearby islets. After the establishment of a British colonial presence in 1789 by the Bengal Presidency, the Jarawas experienced a massive population decline due to the introduction of outside infectious diseases to which they had no immunity. The Great Andamanese tribes were similarly depopulated by their overuse of alcohol and opium (which were introduced to them by colonial officials) after their introduction, leaving open the western areas which the Jarawa gradually made their new homeland. The immigration of mainland Indian and Karen (Burmese) settlers, beginning about two centuries ago, accelerated this process.

Despite the disease epidemics during the colonial era and the chaos of the Second World War (during which they were attacked by imperial Japanese forces), the Jarawas managed to remain intact as a tribe. From the 1970s, the controversial Great Andaman Trunk Road was built through their western forest homeland. As a result, contacts between the Jarawas and outsiders began to increase, resulting in occasional trading but also the outbreak of diseases. Most Jarawas vigorously maintained their independence and distance, however, and actively discouraged most incursions and attempts at contact. Regardless, they became accessible to some Indian linguists. From 1997, Jarawas began to initiate contacts with settled populations instead of being coaxed to show themselves. Meetings with outsiders, especially with tourists, remained extremely dangerous to the Jarawas due to the risk of disease. In spite of these risks, the Jarawas increasingly assumed an active role, learning more about the settled population, taking up opportunities to trade more frequently, and informing themselves about their own special status as protected people. In the process, Jarawas learned other languages, sought medical aid, and began to ask tourists for money if they wanted to take photos.

Today, several Jarawa groups are in regular contact with the outside world through settlements on the fringes of their Reserve, through daily contact with outsiders along the Andaman Trunk Road and at jetties, marketplaces and hospitals near the road and at settlements near the reserve, with some children even showing up at mainstream schools and asking to be educated along with settler children. Jarawas currently have a population of 270 remaining.

=== Hunting and diet ===
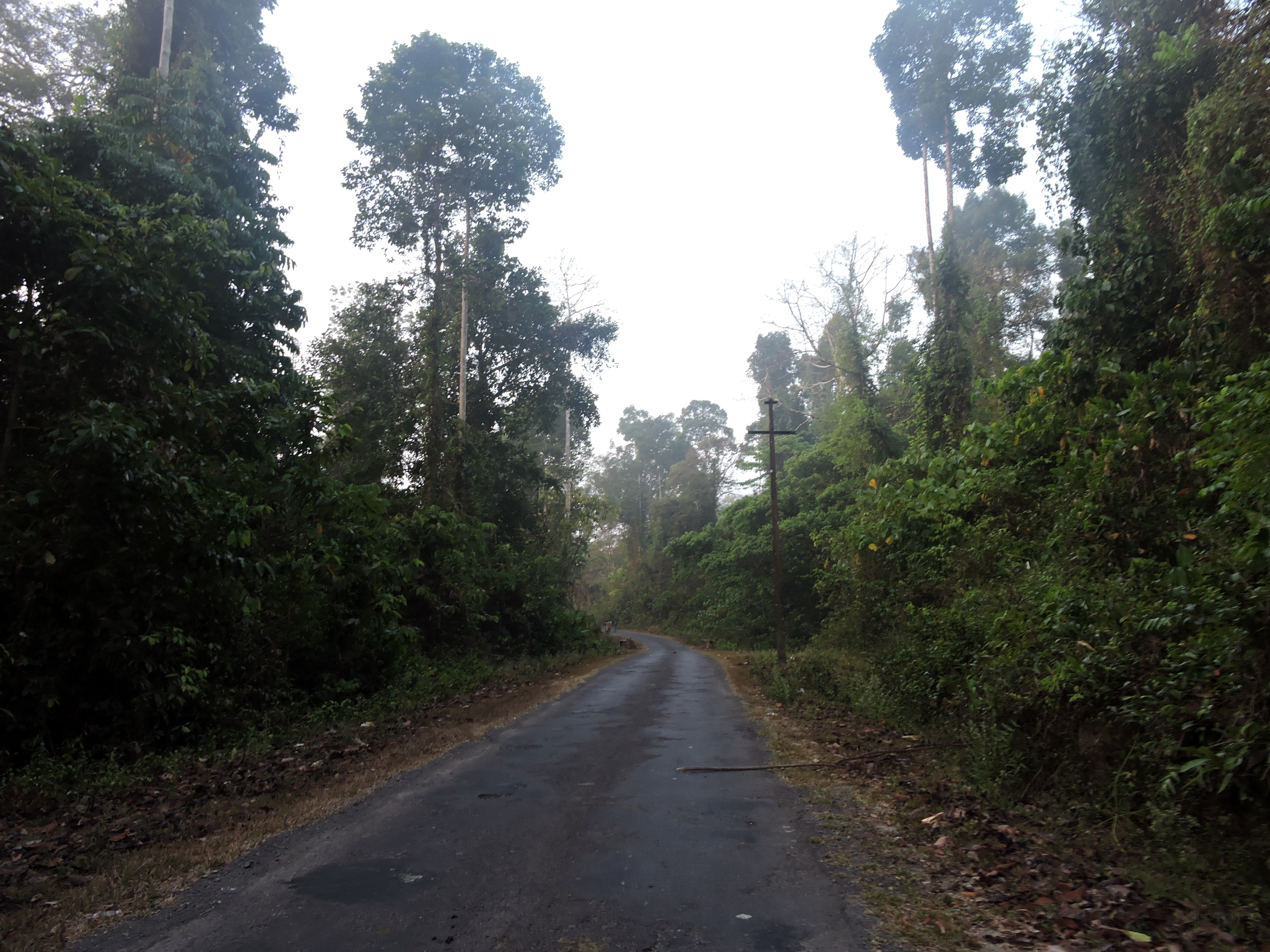
Forest in the Jarwa reserve

As the Jarawas are a nomadic tribe, they hunt endemic wild pigs, monitor lizards and other quarry with bows and arrows. They have recently begun keeping dogs to help with hunting, as the Onges and Andamanese do.

Since this is an island tribe, food sources in the ocean are highly important to them. Men fish with bows and arrows in shallow water. Women catch fish with baskets.

Mollusks, dugongs and turtles are a major part of the Jarawa diet. Besides meat and seafood, Jarawas collect fruit, tubers and honey from the forest. In order to get honey from bees, they use a plant extract to calm the bees.

The Jarawa bow, made of chuiood (Sageraea elliptica), is known as "aao" in their own language. The arrow is called "patho". The wooden head of the arrow is made of Areca wood. To make the iron head arrow, called "aetaho" in their language, they use iron and Areca wood or bamboo. When they go hunting or on raids, they wear a chest guard called "kekad".

Food preparation is mainly done by roasting, baking and boiling. However, the Jarawas also consume food raw. The Jarawas have well balanced diets, and since they exploit both terrestrial as well as aquatic resources, they can easily supplement one type of food with another in case of a shortage.

The Jarawas also have support from the Indian government. They receive monthly allowances from the government and also receive wages for taking care of citrus fruit plantations. The Jarawas have a strong dependence on gathering different items, such as turtle eggs, honey, yams, larvae, jackfruit and wild citrus fruits and wild berries.

== Impact of the Great Andaman Trunk Road ==
The biggest threat to the Jarawa in recent years came from the building of the Great Andaman Trunk Road through their newer western forest homeland in the 1970s. In late 1997, some Jarawa started coming out of their forest to visit nearby settlements for the first time. Within months a serious measles epidemic broke out. In 1999 and 2006 the Jarawa suffered another outbreak of measles. No deaths were reported.

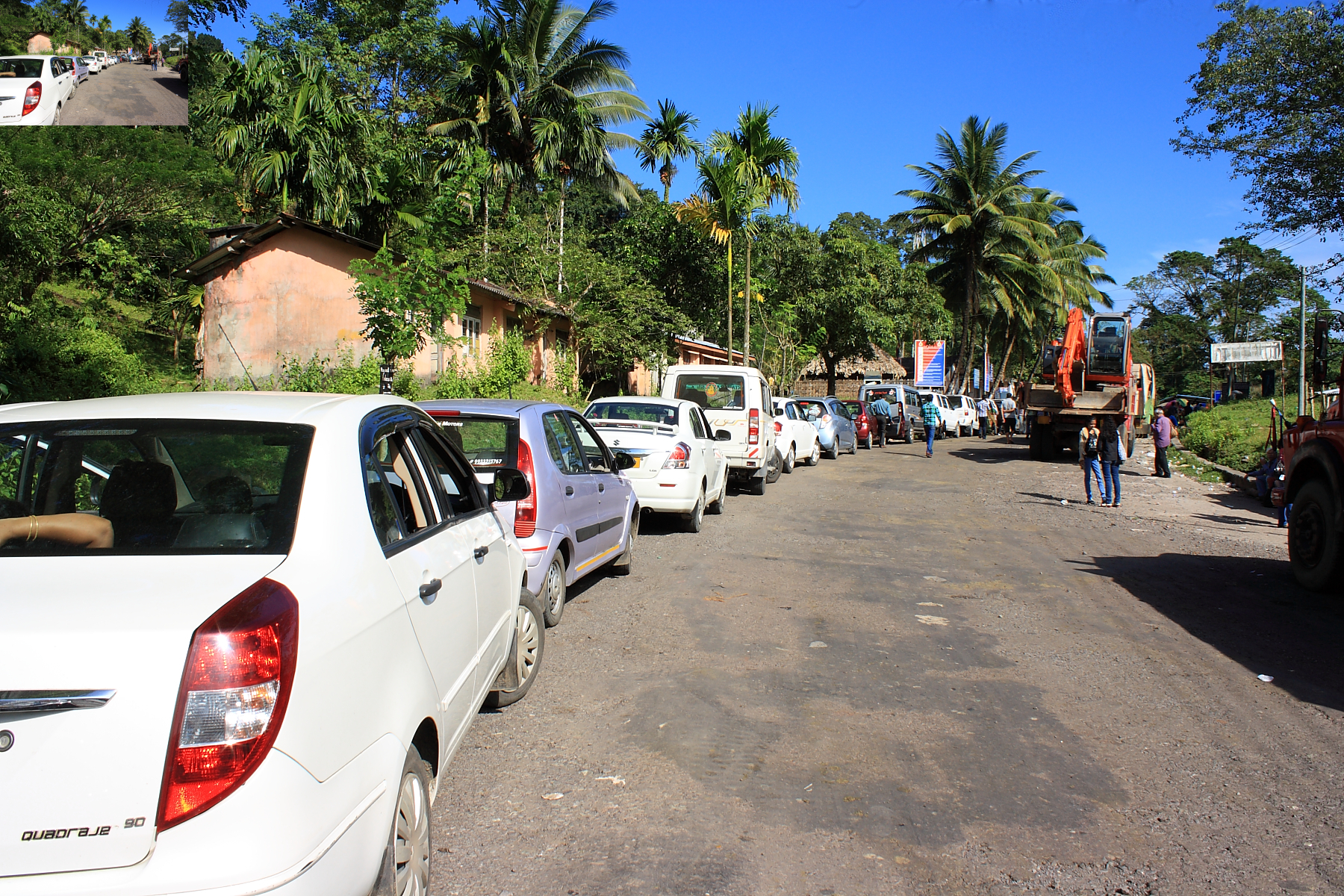
Line of vehicles waiting to enter the Andaman Trunk Road passing through the Jarawa Tribal Reserve (Jirkhatang, South Andaman)

The impact of the highway, in addition to widespread encroachment, poaching and commercial exploitation of Jarawa lands, caused a lawsuit to be filed with the Calcutta High Court, which has jurisdiction over the islands. The case escalated to the Supreme Court of India as a Public Interest Litigation (PIL). The Society for Andaman and Nicobar Ecology, the Bombay Natural History Society and Pune-based Kalpavriksh joined in the petition, resulting in a landmark High Court judgment in 2001, directing the administration to take steps to protect the Jarawa from encroachment and contact, as well as preemptively ruling out any program that involved relocating the Jarawa to a new reservation. Planned extensions of the highway were also prohibited by the court. However, the Light of Andamans editorialised that the changes to the Jarawa were likely irreversible and should have been assessed more thoroughly before the road was built.

== Impact of tourism ==
A major problem is the volume of sightseeing tours that are operated by private companies, where tourists view, photograph or otherwise attempt interactions with Jarawas, who are often begging by the highway. These are illegal under Indian law, and in March 2008, the Tourism Department of the Andaman and Nicobar administration issued a fresh warning to tour operators that attempting contact with Jarawas, photographing them, stopping vehicles while transiting through their land or offering them rides were prohibited under the Protection of Aboriginal Tribes Regulation, 1956 and would be prosecuted under a strict interpretation of the statute. It has been alleged, however, that these rules are being flouted with over 500 tourists being taken to view Jarawas daily by private tour operators, while being shown as transiting to legitimate destinations and resulting in continuing daily interaction between the Jarawa and day tourists inside the reserve area.

In 2006, the Indian travel company Barefoot established a resort 3 km distant from the Jarawa reserve. The development was the subject of a recent court case brought by a small section of Andaman authorities who wanted to stop the resort, and appealed against a Calcutta High Court ruling allowing it to continue. Barefoot won that case.

Some Indian tourism companies bring tourists close to their secluded areas where the natives are tossed food from the caravans. In 2012, a video shot by a tourist showed women encouraged to dance by an off-camera policeman.

On 21 January 2013 a Bench of Justices G.S. Singhvi and H.L. Gokhale passed an interim order banning tourists from taking the trunk road passing through Jarawa areas. As a response to this interim order, a petition was filed on behalf of local inhabitants which stated that the Andaman Trunk Road is a vital road and connects more than 350 villages. The Supreme Court therefore, on 5 March 2013 reversed its interim order, allowing the road to be fully re-opened, but with vehicles only being allowed to travel in large convoys four times a day.

== See also ==
- Jangil
- Negrito
- Andaman Islands
- Onge
- Great Andamanese
