= Anthropological Survey of India =

Indian anthropological organisation

- Emblem of AnSI

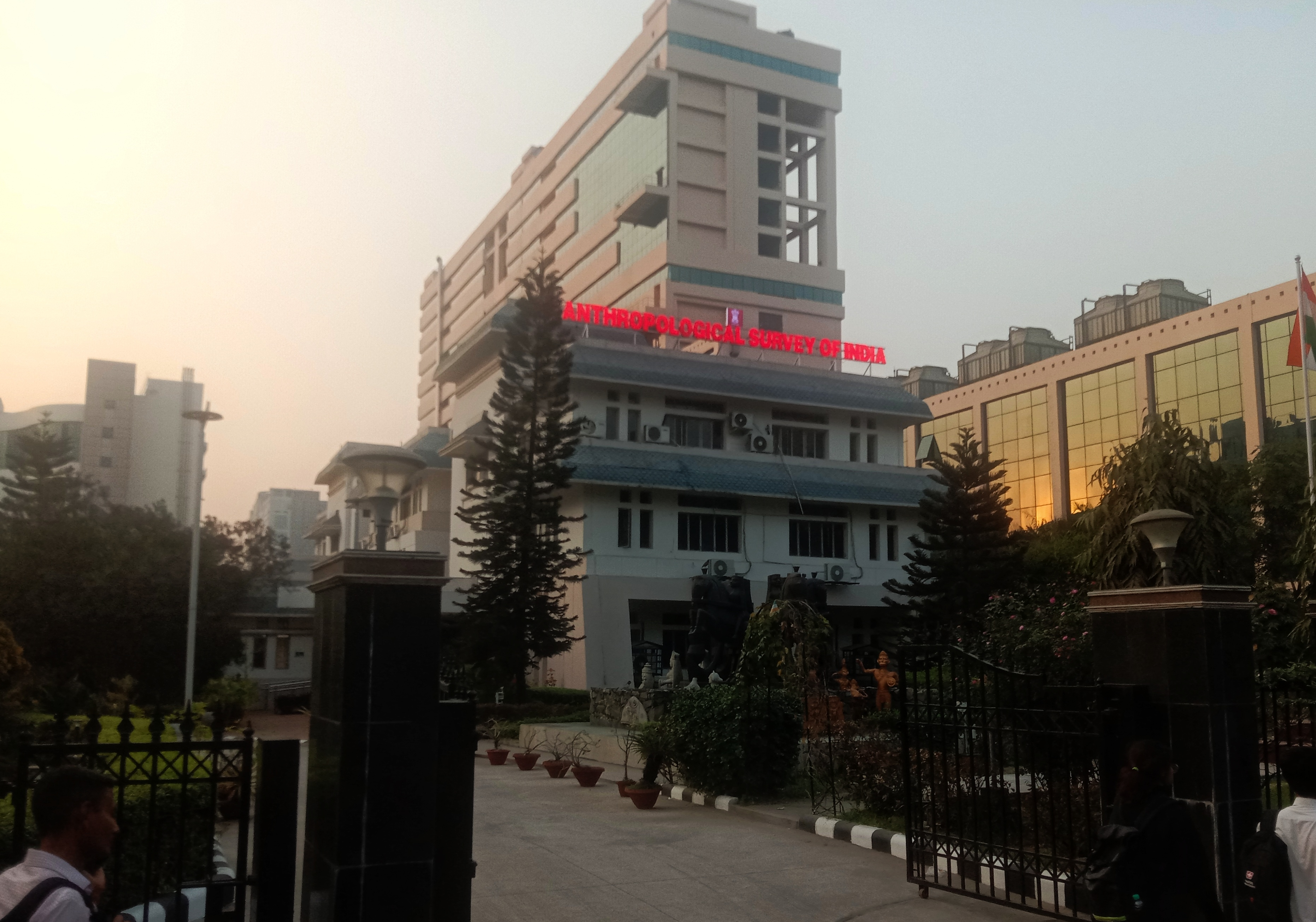
- Anthropological Survey of India building at EN Block, Sector V, Bidhannagar, Kolkata, West Bengal–700091.
- Abbreviation: AnSI
- Formation: 1945; 81 years ago
- Headquarters: Kolkata
- Director: Prof. (Dr.) Bhallamudi V. Sharma
- Parent organisation: Ministry of Culture, Govt. of India
- Website: ansi.gov.in

The Anthropological Survey of India (AnSI) is an Indian government organisation involved in anthropological studies and field data research, primarily engaged in physical anthropology and cultural anthropology, while maintaining a strong focus on indigenous populations. It also attempts to document the cultures of other communities and religious groups.

== History ==
The Anthropological Survey of India was founded in 1945 at Varanasi and shifted to the Indian Museum at Calcutta in 1948.

In 1916, the Zoological and Anthropological sections of the Museum together became a new entity the Zoological Survey of India. Later, in 1945, the Anthropology section formed into an independent body, the Anthropological Survey of India (AnSI), with Biraja Sankar Guha as the initial director and Verrier Elwin, as Deputy Director.

Operating under the Ministry of Culture, Government of India, it is headquartered in Kolkata and has regional centres in Sri Vijaya Puram (Andaman and Nicobar) (Andaman & Nicobar Islands Regional Centre), Shillong (North-East Regional Centre), Dehra Dun (North-West Regional Centre), Udaipur (Western Regional Centre), Nagpur (with Central Library of AnSI) (Central Regional Centre), and Mysore (Southern Regional Centre) (established in 1960), along with sub-regional centers like Jagdalpur.
