= Akabea =

Extinct language spoken in the Andaman Strait

Bea
- Bojigyab, Bôjingîjîda
- Aka-Bea
- Native to: India
- Region: Andaman Islands
- Ethnicity: Bea
- Extinct: 1920s
- Language family: Great Andamanese: Southern; Bea

Language codes
- ISO 639-3: abj
- Glottolog: akab1249
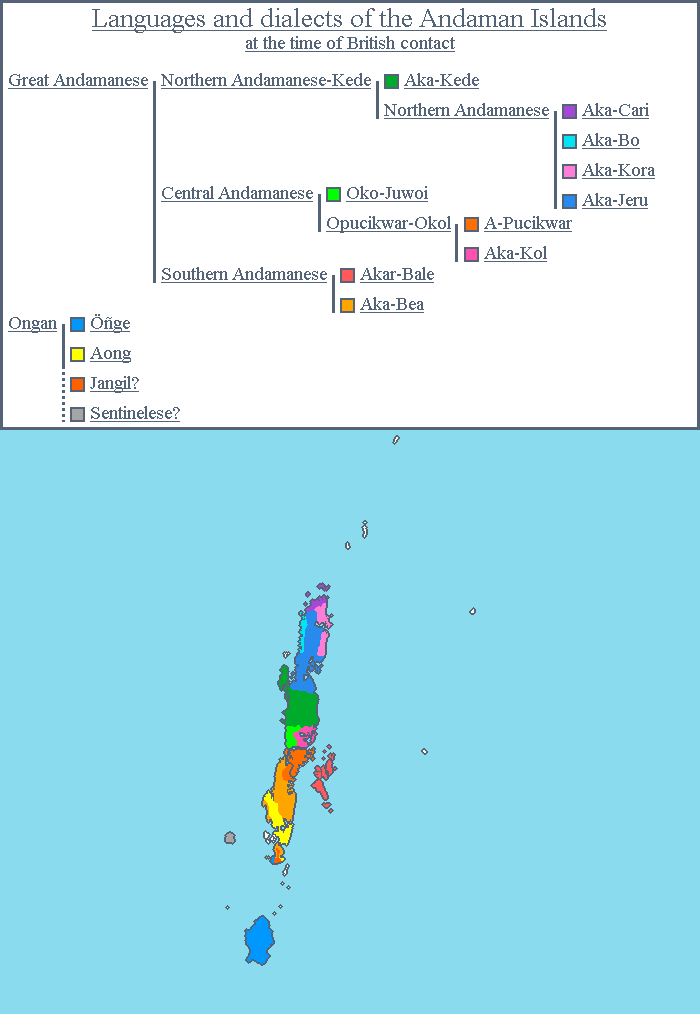
- Aka-Bea

The Bea language, Aka-Bea, also called Bojigyab, is an extinct Great Andamanese language of the Southern group. It was spoken around the western Andaman Strait and around the northern and western coast of South Andaman. It was well documented in the late 19th century, but died out in the 1920s. The term Aka-Bea was used both to name the language and the people who spoke it, derived from the prefix aka-, used to name objects related to the tongue, and bea, meaning 'spring-water'.

== History ==
The Bea were one of the indigenous peoples of the Andaman Islands, one of the ten or so Great Andamanese tribes identified by British colonials in the 1860s. Their language was closely related to the other Great Andamanese languages. They were extinct as a distinct people between 1921 and 1931.

== Phonology ==
=== Consonants ===
| | | Labial | Dental | Alveolar | Retroflex | Palatal | Velar |
|---|---|---|---|---|---|---|---|
| Plosive | voiceless | p | t | | ʈ | | k |
| Plosive | aspirated | | tʰ | | | | |
| Plosive | voiced | b | d | | ɖ | | ɡ |
| Affricate | voiceless | | | | | tʃ (Note: [s] occurs as an optional and idiosyncratic realization of word-final /tʃ/, as well as in non-final positions.) | |
| Affricate | voiced | | | | | dʒ | |
| Nasal | | m | | n | | ɲ | ŋ ŋʲ |
| Fricative | | | | | | | |
| Rhotic | | | | r | ɽ | | |
| Approximant | | w | | l | | j | |

=== Vowels ===
| | Front | Central | Back |
|---|---|---|---|
| Close | i iː | | u uː |
| Close-mid | e eː | | o oː |
| Open-mid | ɛ ɛː | | ɔ ɔː |
| Open | | a aː | |

== Grammar ==
The Great Andamanese languages, including Aka-Bea, are agglutinative languages, with an extensive prefix and suffix system. They have a distinctive noun class system based largely on body parts, in which every noun and adjective may take a prefix according to which body part it is associated with (on the basis of shape, or functional association). Thus, for instance, the *aka- at the beginning of the language names is a prefix for objects related to the tongue. An adjectival example can be given by the various forms of yop, "pliable, soft:

- A cushion or sponge is ot-yop "round-soft", from the prefix attached to words relating to the head or heart.
- A cane is ôto-yop, "pliable", from a prefix for long things.
- A stick or pencil is aka-yop, "pointed", from the tongue prefix.
- A fallen tree is ar-yop, "rotten", from the prefix for limbs or upright things.

Similarly, beri-nga "good" yields:

- un-bēri-ŋa "clever" (hand-good).
- ig-bēri-ŋa "sharp-sighted" (eye-good).
- aka-bēri-ŋa "good at languages" (tongue-good.)
- ot-bēri-ŋa "virtuous" (head/heart-good)

The prefixes are,

| | Bea | Bojigyab |
|---|---|---|
| head/heart | ot- | ote- |
| hand/foot | ong- | ong- |
| mouth/tongue | âkà- | o- |
| torso (shoulder to shins) | ab- | ab- |
| eye/face/arm/breast | i-, ig- | ir- |
| back/leg/butt | ar- | ar- |
| waist | ôto- | |

Body parts are inalienably possessed, requiring a possessive adjective prefix to complete them, so one cannot say "head" alone, but only "my, or his, or your, etc. head".

The basic pronouns are almost identical throughout the Great Andamanese languages; with the Aka-Bea forms given below:

| I, my | d- | we, our | m- |
| thou, thy | ŋ- | you, your | ŋ- |
| he, his, she, her, it, its | a | they, their | l- |

'This' and 'that' are distinguished as k- and t-.

=== Numerals ===
Judging from the available sources, the Andamanese languages have only two cardinal numbers — one and two — and their entire numerical lexicon is one, two, one more, some more, and all. Akabea has been analyzed as an anumeric language, where words analyzed as numerals actually do not refer to specific quantities.

== Sample texts ==
The following poem in Aka-Bea was written by a chief, Jambu, after he was freed from a six-month jail term for manslaughter.

ngô:do kûk l'àrtâ:lagî:ka,
mō:ro el:ma kâ igbâ:dàla
mō:ro el:mo lê aden:yarà
pō:-tōt läh.
Chorus: aden:yarà pō:-tōt läh.

Literally:

thou heart-sad art,
sky-surface to there looking while,
sky-surface of ripple to looking while,

bamboo spear on lean-dost.

Translation:

Thou art sad at heart,
gazing there at the sky's surface,
gazing at the ripple on the sky's surface,

leaning on the bamboo spear.

Note, however, that, as seems to be typical of Andamanese poetry, the words and sentence structure have been somewhat abbreviated or inverted in order to obtain the desired rhythmical effect.

== See also ==
- Andamanese languages
