= List of extinct languages of Asia =

Asian extinct languages

Language Endangerment Status by UNESCO Atlas of the World's Languages in Danger category

Extinct (EX)
- Extinct (EX): (lists)

Endangered
- Critically Endangered (CR); Severely Endangered (SE); Definitely Endangered (DE); Vulnerable (VU): (list); (list); (list); (list)

Safe
- Safe (NE): no list
- Other categories
- Revived (RE); Constructed (CL): (list); (list)
- Related topics: Atlas of the World's Languages in Danger; Endangered Languages Project; Ethnologue; Unclassified language; List of languages by total number of speakers
- UNESCO Atlas of the World's; Languages in Danger categories

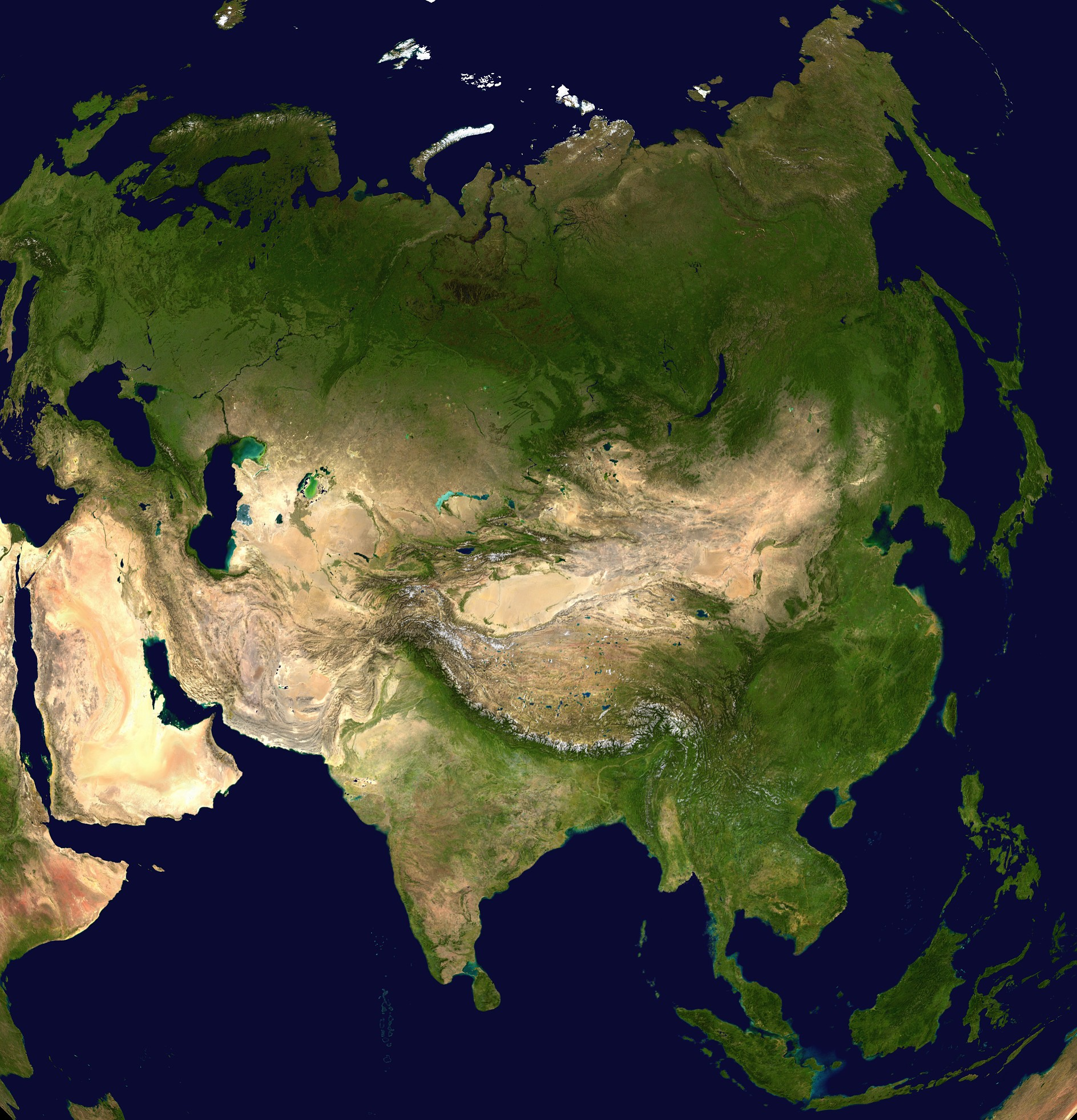

This article is a list of languages and dialects that have no native speakers, no spoken descendants, and that diverged from their parent language in Asia.

There are 253 languages listed. 22 from Central Asia, 51 from East Asia, 22 from South Asia, 44 from Southeast Asia, 28 from Siberia and 86 from West Asia.

== Central Asia ==
Language/dialect	Family	Date of extinction	Ethnic group(s)	Native to	Notes
Avestan	Indo-European	800s BC	Avestan people	Central Asia	Used as scriptural language of Zoroastrianism
Bactrian	Indo-European	1000s AD	Bactrians	Bactria	
Bulgar	Turkic	1200s AD	Bulgars	Pontic–Caspian steppe	
Cuman	Turkic	1770 AD	Cumans	Cumania	
Fergana Kipchak	Turkic	1920s	Fergana Kipchak speakers	Fergana Valley	
Gorgani	Indo-European	1500–1700s AD	Semnani	Gorgan	
Hunnic	unclassified	400s AD	Huns	Eurasian Steppe	
Inku	Indo-European	1990s	Jalali, Pikraj, Shadibaz, Vangawala	Afghanistan	
Kambojan	Indo-European	[data missing]	Kambojas	Kamboja Kingdom	
Khazar	Turkic	1100s AD	Khazars	Khazar Khaganate	
Khwarezmian	Turkic	1000s AD	Khwarezmians	Khwarazm	
Moghol	Mongolic	2013	Moghols	Herat	
Nam	Sino-Tibetan	[data missing]	Nam speakers	Central Asia	
Ongkor Solon	Tungusic	since the 1950s	Ongkor Solons	Xinjiang and Ili Kazakh Autonomous Prefecture	
Pahlavani	Indo-European	[data missing]	Pahlavani people	Chakhansur District	
Parthian	Indo-European	1000s AD	Parthians	Parthia	
Pontic Scythian	Indo-European	0s BC	Scythians	Pontic–Caspian steppe	
Sarghulami	Indo-European	by 2014	Sarghulami	Badakhshan	
Tirahi	Indo-European	by 2025	Tirahi	Nangarhar	
Vanji	Indo-European	after 1925	Vanj people	Emirate of Bukhara	
Wotapuri-Katarqalai	Indo-European	1960	Wotapuri-Katarqalai speakers	Afghanistan	
Yueban	unclassified	after 490 AD	Yueban	Jetisu	

== East Asia ==
Language/dialect	Family	Date of extinction	Ethnic group(s)	Native to	Notes
Alchuka	Tungusic	1980s	Alchuka	Heilongjiang	
Babuza	Austronesian	by 1977	Babuza and Taokas	western coast of Taiwan	
Baekje	Koreanic	600s AD	Baekje	Baekje	
Bailang	Sino-Tibetan	300s AD	Bailang speakers	Sichuan	
Bala	Koreanic	1982 AD	Bala	Zhangguangcai Range	
Balhae	unclassified	[data missing]	Balhae speakers	Balhae	
Basay	Austronesian	1940–1960s	Qauqaut and Basay	Northern Taiwan	
Buyeo	Koreanic	500s AD	Yemaek	Manchuria	
Di	unclassified	after 500s AD	Di	western China	
Dingling	unclassified	after 600s AD	Dingling	northern China	
Duan	Para-Mongolic?	after 356 AD	Duan tribe	Liaoxi Commandery	
Emishi	Ainu languages?	[data missing]	Emishi people	northern Japan	
Favorlang	Austronesian	1740–1760s	Babuza	Taiwan	
Gaya	Koreanic	600s AD	Kara tribal confederation	Gaya confederacy	
Goguryeo	Koreanic	700s AD	Goguryeo people	Manchuria and Korea	
Hokkaido Ainu	Ainu	by 2021	Ainu people	Hokkaido	
Jie	either Yeniseian or Turkic	after 350 AD	Jie people	Northern China	
Kiautschou German pidgin	German-based pidgin	1900–1920s	German-educated Chinese	Kiautschou Bay Leased Territory	
Khitan	Para-Mongolic?	1125 AD	Khitan people	northeastern China, southeastern Mongolia and eastern Siberia	
Khoton	Turkic	1800s AD	Khotons	Inner Mongolia and Mongolia	
Kulon	Austronesian	[data missing]	Kulon speakers	Taiwan	
Kyakala	Tungusic	1980s	Kyakala	Northeastern China	
Lewu	Sino-Tibetan	1985	Yao	Yunnan	
Longjia	Sino-Tibetan	possibly by 2011	Longjia	Guizhou	
Luilang	Austronesian	by 1977	Ketagalan	Banqiao District	
Luren	Sino-Tibetan	1960s	Luren	Guizhou	
Mahan	Koreanic?	600s AD	Mahan people	Mahan confederacy	
Matagi	Japonic	2021 AD	Matagi	Akita and Aomori	
Mulao	Kra–Dai	2010s	Mulao	Guizhou	
Okjeo	Koreanic?	500s AD	Okjeo people	Okjeo	
Old Yue	unclassified	0s AD	Nanyue	Southern China	
Papora-Hoanya	Austronesian	by 2009	Papora and Hoanya	Taiwan	
Pazeh	Austronesian	2010	Kazabu and Pazeh people	Taiwan	12 speakers of Kaxabu dialect
Qifu	Para-Mongolic?	400s AD	Xianbei	Western Qin	
Rouran	Mongolic	after 620 AD	Rouran	Rouran Khaganate (Mongolia and Northern China)	
Saka	Indo-European	1000s AD	Saka	Tarim Basin	
Siraya	Austronesian	1800s AD	Siraya	Taiwan	
Taivoan	Austronesian	1870–1890s AD	Taivoan people	Taiwan	
Tamna	Japonic?	1400s AD	Tamnans	Tamna	
Tangut	Sino-Tibetan	1500s AD	Tangut	Northwestern China	
Tocharian A	Indo-European	850 AD	Tocharians	Tarim Basin	
Tocharian B	Indo-European	850 AD	Tocharians	Kucha	
Tocharian C	Indo-European	850 AD	Tocharians	Tarim Basin	
Tuyuhun	Para-Mongolic?	500s AD	Tuyuhun people	Tuyuhun	
Tuoba	Para-Mongolic?	400s AD	Tuoba	Northern China and Mongolia	
Wuhuan	Para-Mongolic?	200s AD	Wuhuan	Inner Mongolia	
Wusun	Indo-European	after 5th century AD	Wusun	Qilian Mountains and Dunhuang	
Xiongnu	unclassified	100s AD	Xiongnu	Xiongnu Empire	
Xianbei	Para-Mongolic?	200s AD	Xianbei	Xianbei state	
Ye-Maek	Koreanic	500s AD	Yemaek	Manchuria and Southern Korea	
Yokohamese	Japanese based pidgin	1870–1890s	Western and Chinese traders	Yokohama	
Zhang-Zhung	Sino-Tibetan	900s AD	Zhangzhung people	western Tibet	

== South Asia ==
Language/dialect	Family	Date of extinction	Ethnic group(s)	Native to	Notes
Aariya	unclassified	after 1964	Aariya	Madhya Pradesh	
Ahom	Kra–Dai	1800s	Ahoms	Assam	
Angami Naga Sign Language	language isolate	after 1921	Angami Nagas	Nagaland	
Ashokan Prakrit	Indo-European	232 BC	Ashoka	Maurya Empire	
Bengali Portuguese Creole	Portuguese creole	early 20th century	Bengali Portuguese Creole speakers	India and Bangladesh	
Bombay Portuguese Creole	Portuguese creole	[data missing]	Bombay Portuguese Creole speakers	Mumbai	
Chairel	Sino-Tibetan	after 1859	Chairel speakers	Manipur	
Chakpa	Sino-Tibetan	since the 1950s	Chakpa speakers	Manipur	
Cochin Portuguese Creole	Portuguese creole	20 August 2010	Cochin Portuguese Creole speakers	Kochi	
Dura	Sino-Tibetan	August 2008	Dura	Nepal	
Gandhari	Indo-European	200s AD	Gandhari people	Gandhara	
Harappan	unclassified	1900s BC	Harappan people	Indus River	
Judeo-Urdu	Indo-European	1700s	Baghdadi Jews	Mumbai and Kolkata	
Lubanki	Indo-European	[data missing]	Labana	Punjab	
Malaryan	Dravidian	by 1996	Malaryan speakers	Kerala	
Moran	Sino-Tibetan	by 1931	Morans	Assam	
Nagarchal	Dravidian	1981	Nagarchi	Central India	
Paishachi	Indo-European	900s AD	Paishachi people	North India	
Rangas	Sino-Tibetan	after 1900–1920s	Rangkas people	Uttarakhand	
Shauraseni Prakrit	Indo-European	1000s AD	Medieval Indians	Medieval India	
Tolcha	Sino-Tibetan	since the 1950s	Tolcchas	Niti Valley	Dialect of Rongpo
Ullatan	Dravidian	1991	Ulladan	India	

== Southeast Asia ==
Language/dialect	Family	Date of extinction	Ethnic group(s)	Native to	Notes
Ampanang	Austronesian	after 1905	Ampanang speakers	Kenohan, Kutai Kartanegara Regency	
Bale	Andamanese	1930–1950s	Bale	Ritchie's Archipelago, Havelock Island and Neil Island	
Bea	Andamanese	1931	Bea	western Andaman Strait and the northern and western coast of South Andaman	
Bo	Andamanese	January 26, 2010	Bo	west central coast of the North Andaman and on the North Reef Island	Dialect of Northern Andamanese
Cari	Andamanese	April 4, 2020	Cari	north coast of North Andaman and on Landfall Island	Dialect of Northern Andamanese
Dicamay Agta	Austronesian	1957–1974	Aeta	Luzon	
Hoti	Austronesian	by 2007 AD	Hoti speakers	Maluku Islands	
Hpon	Sino-Tibetan	1990s	Hpon speakers	Myanmar	
Hukumina	Austronesian	by 2024	Hukumina speakers	northwest Buru	
Jangil	Andamanese	by 1920s	Jangil	Rutland Island	Unattested
Judeo-Malay	Austronesian	[data missing]	Malaysian Jews	Penang	
Juwoi	Andamanese	1931	Juwoi	west central and southwest interior of Middle Andaman	
Kamarian	Austronesian	2001–2007	Kamarian	west Seram Island	
Katabangan	Austronesian	by 2006	Agta	Bondoc Peninsula	
Kayeli	Austronesian	1989	Kayeli people	Buru	
Kede	Andamanese	1930–1950s	Aka-Kede	Southeast Middle Andaman	
Kenaboi	unclassified	after 1890s	Kenaboi	Negeri Sembilan	
Kol	Andamanese	1921	Kol	Northern section of Middle Andaman	
Kora	Andamanese	November 2009	Kora	northeast and north central coasts of North Andaman and Smith Island	Dialect of Northern Andamanese
Lelak	Austronesian	1970s	Lelak people	Sarawak	
Loun	Austronesian	[data missing]	Loun people	Maluku Islands	
Luhu	Austronesian	by 2024	Luhu speakers	Seram Island	
Makuva	Trans–New Guinea?	1950s	Makuva people	East Timor	
Mardijker	Portuguese creole	2012	Mardijker people	Jakarta	
Mixed Great Andamanese	Mixed Khora–Bo–Jeru–Sare on a Jeru base	2009	Jeru	Strait Island	
Moksela	unclassified	1974	Moksela people	Buru Island	
Mount Iraya Agta	Austronesian	by 2013	Aeta	east of Lake Buhi	
Nakaʼela	Austronesian	1990s	Nakaʼela speakers	Maluku Islands	
Nila	Austronesian	1999	Nila speakers	Nila Island and Seram Island	
Pucikwar	Andamanese	1930–1950s	Pucikwar	south coast of Middle Andaman, northeast coast of South Andaman and Baratang Island	
Palumata	Austronesian?	by 2024	Palumata speakers	Buru	
Phalok	Austroasiatic	since 1950s	Phalok people	Chiang Mai	Dialect of Eastern Lawa
Portugis	Portuguese creole	by 2024	Christians of mixed Portuguese and Malay ancestry	Indonesia	
Pyu	Sino-Tibetan	1100s AD	Pyu people	Myanmar	
Rusenu	Trans–New Guinea?	after 2007	Rusenu speakers	eastern East Timor	
Sabüm	Austroasiatic	1976	[data missing]	Malaysia	
Seru	Austronesian	since 1950s	Seru people	Sarawak	
Serua	Austronesian	by 2024	Seruans	Seram Island	
Taman	Sino-Tibetan	1990s	Shan	Tamanthi	
Tambora	Papuan	April 1815	Tambora culture	Sumbawa	
Tây Bồi	French pidgin	after 1954	Vietnamese people	Vietnam	
Teun	Austronesian	2013	Teun speakers	Seram Island	
Timor Pidgin	Portuguese creole	1960s	Portuguese settlers	Dili	
Wila'	Austroasiatic	1800s–1820s	Wila' speaking people	Malaysia	

== Siberia ==
Language/dialect	Family	Date of extinction	Ethnic group(s)	Native to	Notes
Arin	Yeniseian	late 1730s	Arins	Yenisey between Yeniseysk and Krasnoyarsk	
Arman	Tungusic	1970s	Evens	Arman river	Dialect of Even
Assan	Yeniseian	1790	Asan people	Krasnoyarsk Krai	
Bering Aleut	Eskaleut	March 2021	Aleuts	Kamchatka Krai, Russia	Dialect of Aleut
Chuvan	Yukaghir	1700s	Chuvans	Anadyr river basin of Chukotka	
Eastern Itelmen	Chukotko-Kamchatkan	1930s	Itelmens	Kamchatka Peninsula	
Eastern Mansi	Uralic	2018	Mansi	Khanty-Mansi	
Govorka	Russian based creole	by 2005	Nganasan	Taymyr Peninsula	
Kamas	Uralic	1989	Kamasins	north of the Sayan Mountains	
Kamas Turk	Turkic	since 1950s	Koibals and Kamasins	Khakassia	Dialect of Khakas
Kerek	Chukotko-Kamchatkan	2005	Kereks	Chukotka	
Kott	Yeniseian	1800s	Kotts	Mana	
Kuril Ainu	Ainu	1850–1890s	Kuril Ainu	Kuril Islands, Kamchatka and Hokkaido	
Kyakhta	Russian-Chinese pidgin	1920–1940s	Russian and Chinese traders	Kyakhta	
Lower Chulym	Turkic	2011	Chulyms	Siberia	Dialect of Chulym
Mator	Uralic	1840 AD	Koibal	Sayan Mountains	
Mednyj Aleut	Mixed Aleut–Russian	October 2022	Alaskan Creoles on Medny Island	Commander Islands, Russia	
Omok	Yukaghir	1700s	Omoks	Yakutia and Magadan	
Oroch	Tungusic	2008	Orochs	Khabarovsk Krai	119 speakers reported in 2021
Pumpokol	Yeniseian	1740s	Pumpokols	Yenisey	
Sakhalin Ainu	Ainu	1994	Sakhalin Ainu	Sakhalin and Hokkaido	
Sireniki	Eskaleut	1997	Sirenik Eskimos	Bering Strait region	
Southern Itelmen	Chukotko-Kamchatkan	1900s	Itelmens	Kamchatka Peninsula	
Southern Khanty	Uralic	1940s–1960s	Khanty	lower Irtysh	56 speakers reported in 2010
Southern Mansi	Uralic	1930–1970s	Mansi	Sverdlovsk	
Western Mansi	Uralic	1970–1990s	Mansi	Sverdlovsk	
Yugh	Yeniseian	by 1972	Yug	Yenisey	
Yurats	Uralic	1800s	Yurats	west of the Yenisey	

== West Asia ==
Language/dialect	Family	Date of extinction	Ethnic group(s)	Native to	Notes
Adhari	Indo-European	1600s AD	Azaris	Iranian Azerbaijan	
Akkadian	Afroasiatic	100s AD	Akkadians	Mesopotamia	
Ammonite	Afroasiatic	500s BC	Ammonites	northwestern Jordan	
Amorite	Afroasiatic	2nd millennium BC	Amorites	Levant	
Ancient Cappadocian	unclassified	500s AD	Ancient Cappadocian speakers	Anatolia	
Armazic	Afroasiatic	100s AD	Aramaic Caucasians	South Caucasus	Dialect of Aramaic
Ashurian	Afroasiatic	after 1300s AD	People of Assur	Upper Mesopotamia	
Carian	Indo-European	200s BC	Carians	Caria	
Challa Neo-Aramaic	Afroasiatic	[data missing]	Tyari	Çukurca	
Christian Palestinian Aramaic	Afroasiatic	1200s AD	Melkite Christians	Palestine, Transjordan and Sinai	
Cimmerian	Indo-European	620–580s BC	Cimmerians	West Asia	
Dadanitic	Afroasiatic	second half of the first millennium BC	Lihyanites	Lihyan	
Daylami	Indo-European	1300s AD	Daylamites	South Caspian Sea	
Dilmunite	Afroasiatic	First half of the second millennium BC	Arabs	Dilmun	
Dumaitic	Afroasiatic	600s BC	Lihyanites	Lihyan	
Eblaite	Afroasiatic	3rd millennium BC	Eblabites	Ebla	
Edomite	Afroasiatic	early half of 1st millennium BC	Edomites	southwest Jordan and southern Israel	
Elamite	language isolate	700s BC	Elamites	Elam	
Eteocypriot	unclassified	300s BC	Eteocypriots	Cyprus	
Galatian	Indo-European	500s AD	Galatians	Galatia	
Garachi	Indo-European	[data missing]	Garachi	Azerbaijan	Dialect of Domari
Gutian	unclassified	[data missing]	Guti	Zagros Mountains?	
Hadramautic	Afroasiatic	600s AD	Hadramites	Yemen, Oman and Saudi Arabia	
Hasaitic	Afroasiatic	100s AD	Arabs	Al-Ahsa Oasis	
Hatran	Afroasiatic	240 AD	People of Hatra	Upper Mesopotamia	
Hattian	unclassified	2nd millennium BC	Hattians	Anatolia	
Himyaritic	Afroasiatic	by 1000s AD	Himyarite tribal confederacy	Yemen	
Hismaic	Afroasiatic	300s AD	Arabs	Ḥismā	
Hittite	Indo-European	1180s BC	Hittites	Anatolia	
Hurrian	Hurro-Urartian	1st millennium BC	Hurrians	Mitanni	
Isaurian	Indo-European	500s AD	Isaurians	Isauria	
Jewish Babylonian Aramaic	Afroasiatic	1200 AD	Babylonian Jews	Babylon	
Jewish Palestinian Aramaic	Afroasiatic	1200 AD	Jews	Judea and Levant	
Judeo-Golpaygani	Indo-European	[data missing]	Persian Jews	Golpayegan	
Kalasmaic	Indo-European	1200s BC	Luwic people	Anatolia	
Karamanli Turkish	Turkic	1800s	Turkey	Karamanlides	Dialect of Turkish
Karapapakh	Turkic	1900s	Karapapakhs	South Caucasus	
Kaskian	unclassified	700s BC	Kaskians	Northeastern Anatolia and Colchis	
Kassite	Hurro-Urartian ?	300s BC	Kassites	Babylon	
Kilit	Indo-European	after 1950s	Talysh of Kilit	Nakhchivan	
Lebanese Aramaic	Afroasiatic	1800s	Arameans	Mount Lebanon	
Lullubian	Hurro-Urartian ?	600s BC	Lullubi	Lullubi Kingdom	
Luwian	Indo-European	1st millennium BC	Luwians	Anatolia and northern Syria	
Lycaonian	unclassified	after 50 AD	Lycaonians	Lycaonia	
Lycian	Indo-European	200s BC	Lycians	Lycia and Lycaonia	
Lydian	Indo-European	200s BC	Lydians	Lydia	
Malatia	Indo-European	[data missing]	Armenians	Adıyaman	Dialect of Armenian
Mamluk-Kipchak	Turkic	after 1516 AD	Mamluk	Syria	
Mannaean	Hurro-Urartian ?	600s BC	Mannaeans	Mannaea	
Median	Indo-European	100s AD	Medes	Persia	
Milyan	Indo-European	1st millennium BC	Milyans	Milyas	
Minaean	Afroasiatic	600s AD	Minaeans	Yemen	
Minoan	unclassified	1450s BC	Minoans	Crete and Ugarit	
Mitanni Indo-Aryan	Indo-European	after 1300s BC	Indo-Aryan peoples	Mitanni	
Mlaḥsô	Afroasiatic	1999	Syriac Orthodox Christians	Mlahsô and Qamishli	
Moabite	Afroasiatic	early half of 1st millennium BC	Moabites	Moab	
Mysian	Indo-European	0s BC	Mysians	Mysia	
Nabataean Arabic	Afroasiatic	0s AD	Nabataeans	Levant, Sinai Peninsula and northwest Arabia	
Nabataean Aramaic	Afroasiatic	455/6 AD	Nabataeans	Arabia Petraea	
Old Kazeruni	Indo-European	[data missing]	Kazeruni people	Kazerun	
Palaic	Indo-European	2nd millennium BC	Palaic peoples	Pala	
Palmyrene Aramaic	Afroasiatic	after 274 AD	Palmyrenes	Syrian Desert, primarily in Palmyra	
Philistine Canaanite	Afroasiatic	700s BC	Philistines	Philistia	
Philistine Indo-European	unclassified, probably Indo-European	900s BC	Philistines	Philistia	
Phoenician	Afroasiatic	1st millennium BC	Phoenicians	Canaan and Cyprus	
Phrygian	Indo-European	after 400 AD	Phrygians	Central Anatolia	
Pisidic	Indo-European	200s BC	Pisidians	Pisidia	
Propontis Tsakonian	Indo-European	1970	Tsakonians	Vatika and Havoutsi	Dialect of Tsakonian
Qatabanian	Afroasiatic	600s AD	People of Qataban	Yemen	
Qatrayith	Afroasiatic	900s AD	Qatrayith speakers	Eastern Arabia	
Razi	Indo-European	[data missing]	Ray people	Ray	
Sabaic	Afroasiatic	600s AD	Sabaeans	Yemen	
Sabir	Romance-based pidgin	1800s AD	Medieval traders and Crusaders	Mediterranean Basin	
Safaitic	Afroasiatic	200s AD	Northern Arabs	Syria	
Samalian	Afroasiatic	730s BC	People of Samʾal	Samʾal	
Shirvani Arabic	Afroasiatic	1850–1890s AD	Shirvan	Caucasian Arabs	
Sidetic	Indo-European	200s BC	People of Side	Side	
South Gileadite	Afroasiatic	770s BC	People of Deir Alla	Deir Alla	
Subarian	Hurro-Urartian ?	3rd–2nd millenium BC	Subarians	Subartu	
Sumerian	language isolate	0s AD	Sumerians	Sumer and Akkad	
Sutean	Afroasiatic	1100s BC	Suteans	Levant and Mesopotamia	
Taymanitic	Afroasiatic	500s BC	Ancient North Arabian Arabs	Tayma	
Thamudic	Afroasiatic	after 267 AD	Thamud	Kingdom of Thamud	
Trojan	unclassified	1300 BC	Trojans	Troy	
Ubykh	Northwest Caucasian	7 October 1992 AD	Ubykh	Ubykhia	
Ugaritic	Afroasiatic	1300s BC	People of Ugarit	Levant	
Urartian	Hurro-Urartian	early 500s BC	Urarteans	Urartu	

== See also ==
- List of languages by time of extinction
- List of extinct languages and dialects of Europe
- Languages of Asia
- List of endangered languages in Asia

== Bibliography ==
- Christopher Moseley; Alexandre Nicolas (2010), "Atlas of the world's languages in danger", UNESCO
