= Great Andamanese languages =

Nearly extinct language family of the Andaman Islands

Great Andamanese
- Geographic distribution: Formerly on Great Andaman Island
- Ethnicity: Great Andamanese people
- Linguistic classification: One of the world's primary language families
- Subdivisions: Northern – Kede; Central †; Southern †

Language codes
- Glottolog: grea1241
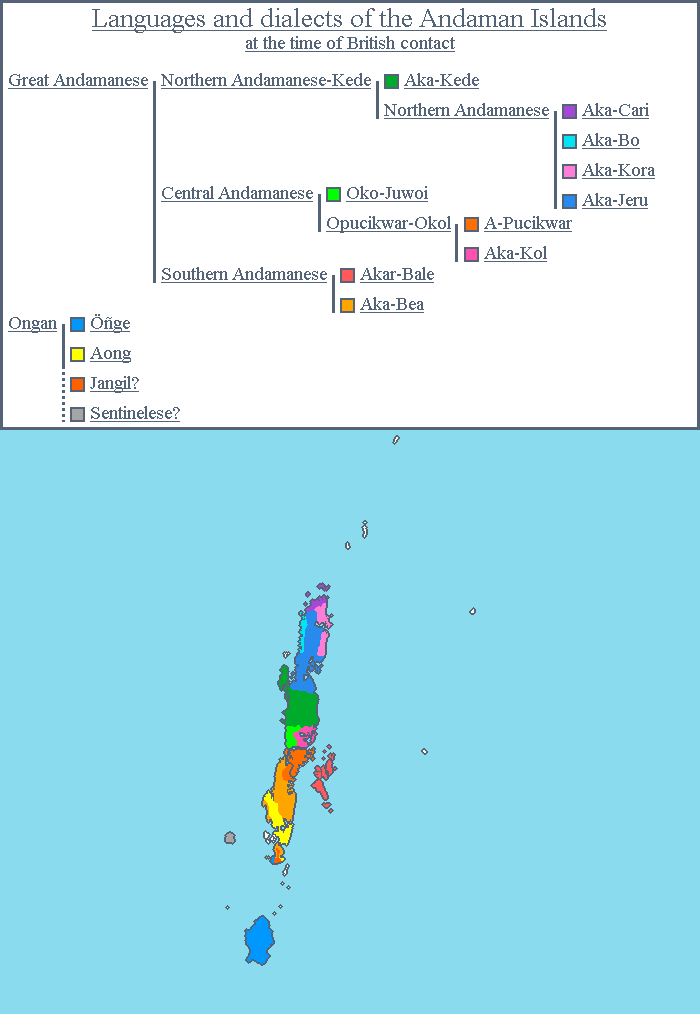
- Ethnolinguistic map of the precolonial Andaman Islands. The languages with prefixes (which mean "language") are Great Andamanese. Note that on southernmost islands, Jarawa, Onge, Jangil^{†} and possibly Sentinelese form the unrelated Ongan languages family).

- Great andamanese [sic] is classified as Critically Endangered according to the UNESCO Atlas of the World's Languages in Danger

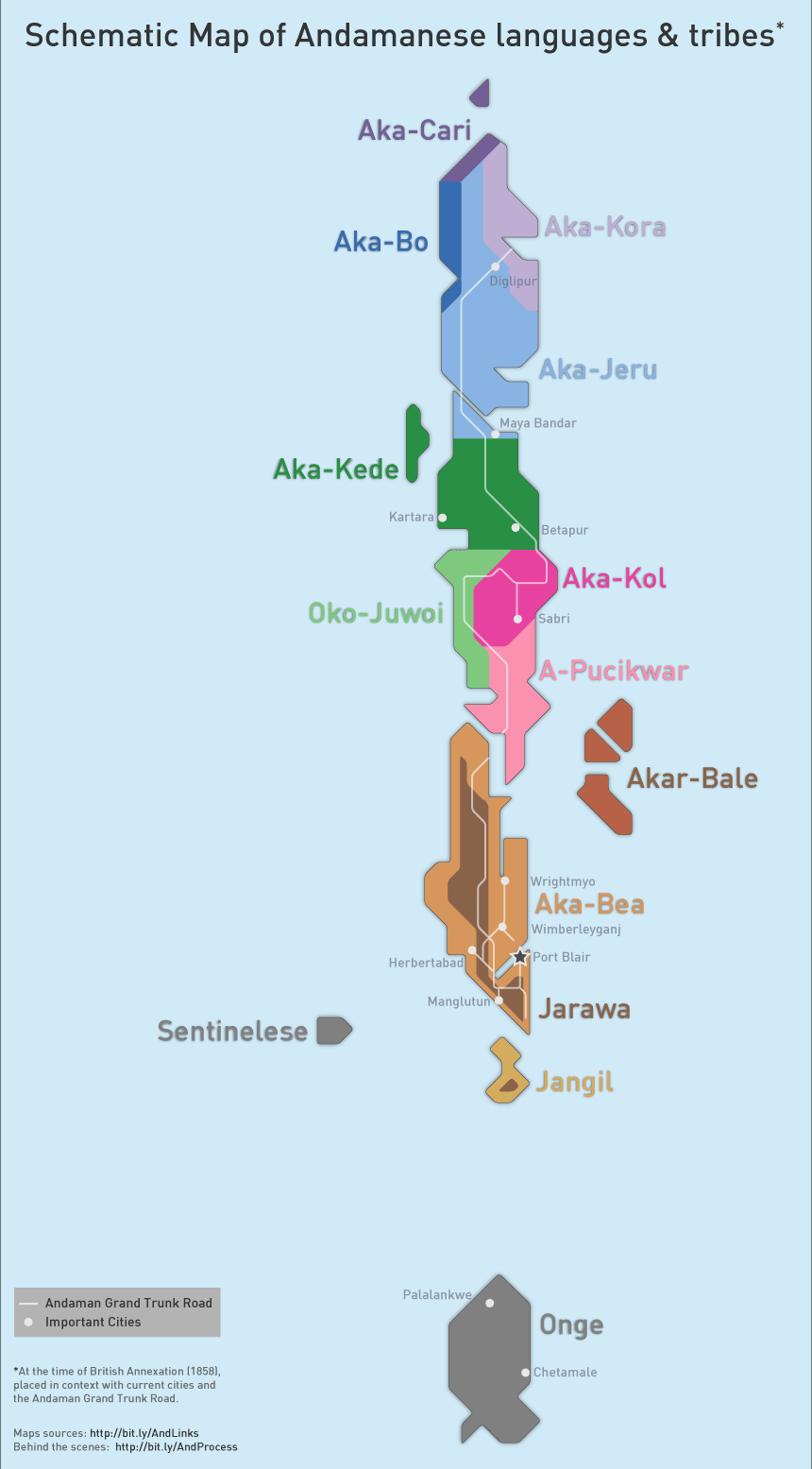
Schematic map of Andamanese languages

The Great Andamanese languages are a nearly extinct language family of half a dozen languages once spoken by the Great Andamanese peoples of the northern and central Andaman Islands in the Indian Ocean, and part of the Andamanese sprachbund.

== History ==
By the late 18th century, when the British first established a colonial presence on the Andaman islands, there were an estimated 5,000 Great Andamanese living on Great Andaman and surrounding islands, comprising 10 distinct tribes with distinct but closely related languages. From the 1860s onwards, the British established a penal colony on the islands, which led to the subsequent arrival of mainland settlers and indentured labourers, mainly from the Indian subcontinent. This coincided with the massive population reduction of the Andamanese due to outside diseases, to a low of 19 individuals in 1961.

Since then their numbers have rebounded somewhat, reaching 52 by 2010. However, by 1994 there were no rememberers of any but the northern lects, and divisions among the surviving tribes (Jeru, Kora, Bo and Cari) had effectively ceased to exist due to intermarriage and resettlement to a much smaller territory on Strait Island. Some of them also intermarried with Karen (Burmese) and Indian settlers. Hindustani serves as their primary language. Some of the population spoke a koine based mainly on the Jeru dialect, but even this is only partially remembered and no longer a language of daily use.

Akakhora became fully extinct in November 2009, when its last rememberer, Boro Sr, died. The last semi-fluent speaker of the koine, Nao Jr., also died in 2009. The last rememberer of Akabo died in 2010 at age 85. The last rememberer of Akachari, a woman called Licho, died from chronic tuberculosis in April 2020 in Shadipur, Port Blair. As of reports published in 2020, there remained three heritage speakers of Akajeru.

== Languages and classification ==
The languages spoken in the Andaman islands fall into two clear families, Great Andamanese and Ongan, plus one unattested language, Sentinelese. The similarities between Great Andamanese and Ongan are mainly of a typological-morphological nature, with little demonstrated common vocabulary. Specialists such as Abbi (2008) consider the surviving Great Andamanese language to be an isolate, and even long-range researchers such as Joseph Greenberg have expressed doubts as to the validity of Andamanese as a family.

The Great Andaman languages fall into 3 clear clusters. Several of the varieties traditionally listed as languages are dialects, such as the four spoken on North Andaman Island:

- Great Andamanese
  - Southern Andamanese
    - Akabea or Bea †
    - Akabale or Bale †
  - Central Andamanese
    - Okojuwoi or Juwoi †
    - Opucikwar–Okol language
      - Opucikwar or Pucikwar dialect †
      - Okol or Kol dialect †
  - Northern Andamanese – Kede
    - Akakede or Kede †
    - Northern Andamanese
      - Akachari or Cari dialect †
      - Akakhora or Kora dialect †
      - Akabo or Bo dialect †
      - Akajeru or Jeru dialect

Joseph Greenberg proposed that Great Andamanese is related to western Papuan languages as members of a larger phylum he called Indo-Pacific, but this is not generally accepted by other linguists. Stephen Wurm states that the lexical similarities between Great Andamanese and the West Papuan and certain languages of Timor "are quite striking and amount to virtual formal identity [...] in a number of instances", and claims that "there seems to be some evidence in support of the possibility that the Andaman languages may have some link, perhaps relational, with languages of one or several of the more archaic Papuan phylic groups [...] though the distance between them is still considerable".

== Grammar ==
The Great Andamanese languages are agglutinative languages, with an extensive prefix and suffix system. They have a distinctive noun class system based largely on body parts, in which every noun and adjective may take a prefix according to which body part it is associated with (on the basis of shape, or functional association). Thus, for instance, the *aka- at the beginning of the language names is a prefix for objects related to the tongue. An adjectival example can be given by the various forms of yop, "pliable, soft", in Akabea:

- A cushion or sponge is ot-yop "round-soft", from the prefix attached to words relating to the head or heart.
- A cane is ôto-yop, "pliable", from a prefix for long things.
- A stick or pencil is aka-yop, "pointed", from the tongue prefix.
- A fallen tree is ar-yop, "rotten", from the prefix for limbs or upright things.

Similarly, beri-nga "good" yields:

- un-bēri-ŋa "clever" (hand-good).
- ig-bēri-ŋa "sharp-sighted" (eye-good).
- aka-bēri-ŋa "good at languages" (tongue-good).
- ot-bēri-ŋa "virtuous" (head/heart-good).

The prefixes are:

	Bea	Balawa	Bojigyab	Juwoi	Kol
head/heart	ot-	ôt-	ote-	ôto-	ôto-
hand/foot	ong-	ong-	ong-	ôn-	ôn-
mouth/tongue	âkà-	aka-	o-	ókô-	o-
torso (shoulder to shins)	ab-	ab-	ab-	a-	o-
eye/face/arm/breast	i-, ig-	id-	ir-	re-	er-
back/leg/butt	ar-	ar-	ar-	ra-	a-
waist	ôto-				

Abbi (2013: 80) lists the following body part prefixes in Great Andamanese.

Class	Partonomy of the human body	Body class marker
1	mouth and its semantic extensions	a=
2	major external body parts	ɛr=
3	extreme ends of the body (e.g., toes and fingernails)	oŋ=
4	bodily products and part-whole relationships	ut=
5	organs inside the body	e=
6	parts designating round shape or sexual organs	ara=
7	parts for legs and related terms	o= ~ ɔ=

Body parts are inalienably possessed, requiring a possessive adjective prefix to complete them, so one cannot say "head" alone, but only "my, or his, or your, etc. head".

The basic pronouns are almost identical throughout the Great Andamanese languages; Akabea will serve as a representative example (pronouns given in their basic prefixal forms):

I, my	d-	we, our	m-
thou, thy	ŋ-	you, your	ŋ-
he, his, she, her, it, its	a	they, their	l-

'This' and 'that' are distinguished as k- and t-.

Judging from the available sources, the Andamanese languages have only two cardinal numbers — one and two — and their entire numerical lexicon is one, two, one more, some more, and all.

=== Phonology ===
The following is the sound system of the present-day Great Andamanese (PGA):

Vowels
	Front	Central	Back
Close	i		u
Close-mid	e		o
Open-mid	ɛ		ɔ
Open		ɑ	

Consonants
		Labial	Dental	Alveolar	Retroflex	Palatal	Velar
Nasal		m		n		ɲ	ŋ
Plosive	plain	p	t		ʈ	c	k
Plosive	voiced	b	d		ɖ	ɟ	
Plosive	aspirated	pʰ	tʰ		ʈʰ	cʰ	kʰ
Fricative		ɸ ~ β ~ f		s		ʃ	x
Lateral				l ~ lʷ		ʎ	
Rhotic				ɾ ~ r	ɽ		
Semivowel		w				j	

It is noted that a few sounds would have changed among more recent speakers, perhaps due to the influence of Hindi. Older speakers tended to have different pronunciations than among the more younger speakers. The consonant sounds of /pʰ, kʰ, l/ were common among older speakers to pronounce them as [ɸ~f~β, x, lʷ]. The lateral /l/ sound may have also been pronounced as [ʎ]. Sounds such as a labio-velar approximant /w/, only occur within words or can be a word-final, and cannot occur as a word-initial consonant. The sounds [ɽ, β] can occur as allophones of [r, b].

== Samples ==
The following poem in Akabea was written by a chief, Jambu, after he was freed from a six-month jail term for manslaughter.

ngô:do kûk l'àrtâ:lagî:ka,
mō:ro el:ma kâ igbâ:dàla
mō:ro el:mo lê aden:yarà

pō:-tōt läh.

Chorus: aden:yarà pō:-tōt läh.

Literally:

thou heart-sad art,
sky-surface to there looking while,
sky-surface of ripple to looking while,

bamboo spear on lean-dost.

Translation:

Thou art sad at heart,
gazing there at the sky's surface,
gazing at the ripple on the sky's surface,

leaning on the bamboo spear.

Note, however, that, as seems to be typical of Andamanese poetry, the words and sentence structure have been somewhat abbreviated or inverted in order to obtain the desired rhythmical effect.

As another example, we give part of a creation myth in Oko-Juwoi, reminiscent of Prometheus:

Kuro-t'on-mik-a Mom Mirit-la, Bilik l'ôkô-ema-t, peakar at-lo top-chike at laiche Lech-lin a, kotik a ôko-kodak-chine at-lo Karat-tatak-emi-in.
Kuro-t'on-mik-in Mr. Pigeon, God ?-slep-t, wood fire-with stealing-was fire the.late Lech-to he, then he ?-fire-make-did fire-with Karat-tatak-emi-at."
(Translated by Portman) Mr. Pigeon stole a firebrand at Kuro-t'on-mika, while God was sleeping. He gave the brand to the late Lech, who then made fires at Karat-tatak-emi.

== Bibliography ==
- Abbi, Anvita (2011). Dictionary of the Great Andamanese language. Delhi: Ratna Sagar. ISBN 9789350361252.
- Abbi, Anvita (2013). A Grammar of the Great Andamanese Language. Brill's Studies in South and Southwest Asian Languages. Vol. 4. Leiden: Brill. ISBN 978-90-04-23527-4.
- Yadav, Yogendra (1985). "Great Andamanese: A preliminary study". In Bradley, David (ed.). Papers in South-East Asian linguistics no. 9: Language policy, language planning and sociolinguistics in South-East Asia. Pacific Linguistics. Vol. A-67. Canberra: The Australian National University. pp. 185–214. doi:10.15144/PL-A67.185.
- Notes on the languages of the South Andaman Group of Tribes by M. V. Portman (1898)
- A Dictionary of the South Andaman (Aka-Bea) Language. by: Man, Edward Horace (1923)
