= Mixed Great Andamanese =

Koine language of Northern Andamanese

- Great Andamanese koiné
- Native to: India
- Region: Strait Island
- Ethnicity: 60 (2020)
- Extinct: 2009, with the death of Nao Jr., the last semi-fluent speaker
- Language family: Mixed Khora–Bo–Jeru–Sare on a Jeru base

Language codes
- ISO 639-3: gac
- Glottolog: mixe1288
- ELP: Mixed Great Andamanese

Mixed Great Andamanese is a koiné language of the Northern Andamanese language based primarily on the Jeru dialect, with lexical and grammatical influence from other Northern Andamanese dialects (Bo, Kora and Cari).

== Phonology ==
=== Vowels ===
The Great Andamanese koiné has a seven-vowel system.

Vowels
	Front	Central	Back
Close	i		u
Close-mid	e		o
Open-mid	ɛ		ɔ
Open		a	

=== Consonants ===
Consonants
		Labial	Dental /Alveolar	Retroflex	Palatal	Velar
Nasal		m	n		ɲ	ŋ
Plosive	voiceless	p	t	ʈ	tʃ	k
Plosive	voiceless aspirated	pʰ	tʰ	ʈʰ		kʰ
Plosive	voiced	b	d	ɖ	dʒ	
Fricative			s		ʃ	
Tap			ɾ			
Approximant		w	l		j	

== Grammar ==
It is a head-marking polysynthetic and agglutinative language with a SOV pattern. It has a very elaborate system for marking inalienability, with seven possessive markers reflecting different body-divisions. These markers appear as proclitics that classify a large number of nouns as dependent categories.

== Vocabulary ==
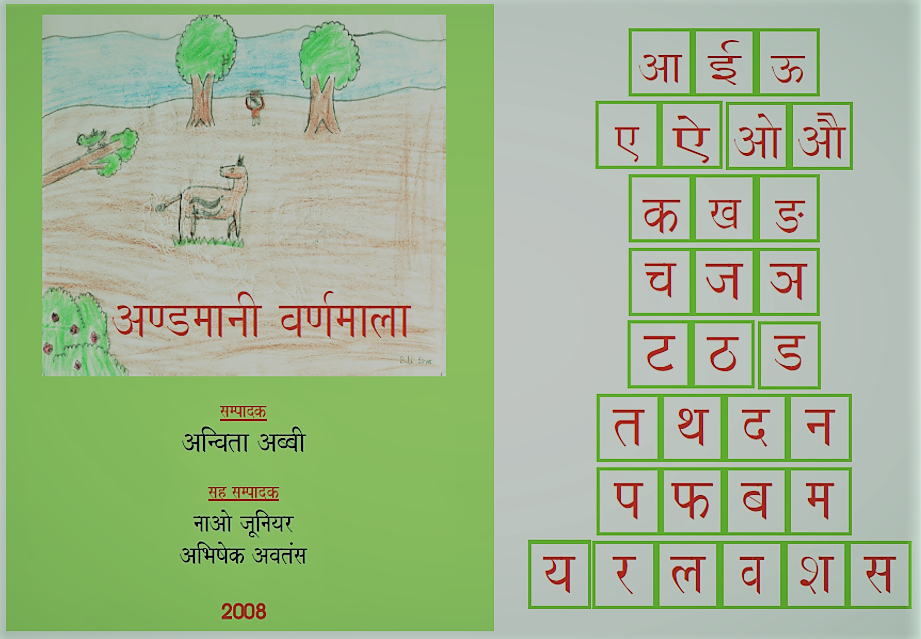
Northern Andamanese literacy material

Koiné vocabulary:

Gloss	Great Andamanese	Devanagari
nest	aaracha	आराचा
housefly	ijibu	ईजीबू
snake (king cobra)	ulukhu	ऊलूखू
chilli	ekajira	एकाजीरा
deer	airen	ऐरेन
fishing net	ocho	ओचो
axe	aulo	औलो
snail	kalatop	कालाटौप
dugong	kauroing	कौरौईञ
coconut	khider	खीदेर
road	ngorto	ङौरतौ
betelnut	chaum	चौम
dolphin	choa	चोआ
bat	jibet	जीबेट
fish	nyure	ञूरे
heron	taka	टाका
tongue	thatat	ठातात
sunset	diu	डीऊ
black pig	dirim raa	डीरीम राऽ
leaf	taich	तौच
dew	thun	थून
scorpion	dikiraseni	दीकीरासेनी
mosquito	nipho	नीफो
mushroom	pata	पाता
crow	phatkaa	फाटका
frog	phorube	फोरूबे
rope	pharako	फाराको
green turtle	belotauro	बेलोटौरौ
grey pigeon	mirit	मीरीत
rooster	maucho	मौचौ
strewn leaves	yephaay taich	येफाऽय तैच
bamboo	rat	रैट
tusked male pig	ratairlauto	रातैरलौतो
smoke	lep	लेप
fire	luro, wuro	लूरो, वूरो
waist jewellery	shirbele	शीरबेले
snake	shubi	शूबी
crocodile	sarekateyo	सारेकातेयो
White-bellied Sea-Eagle	karatchom	करटचोम
Pacific Golden Plover	chelele	चैलेले
Oriental Honey Buzzard	taulom-tut-bio	टौलोम-तूत-बीओ
Whimbrel	chautot	चौटोट

- Column in yellow denotes loanword derived from Hindi

== Place names ==
Vocabulary:

Contemporary name	Present Great Andamanese name
Andaman Islands	Marakele
South Andaman Island	Sorobul
Little Andaman	Ilimu Tauro
Strait Island	Khringkosho
Havelock Island (Swaraj Island)	Thi Lar Siro
Interview Island	Bilikhu Tara Phong
Neill Island (Shaheed Island)	Tebi Shiro
Baratang Island	Boa
Bluff Island	Lurua
Landfall Island	Mauntenga
Long Island	Bol Phong
Inglis Island	Jirikta Phong
Port Blair	Laotara Nyo
Diglipur	Thitaumul
Mayabunder	Ret Phor
Saddle Peak	Puluga Chang
