= Pucikwar =

Indigenous people of Andaman Islands

The Pucikwar were one of the indigenous peoples of the Andaman Islands, one of the ten or so Great Andamanese tribes identified by the British colonizers in the 1860s. They spoke the Opucikwar dialect (also 'A-Pucikwar') which was closely related to the Okol dialect. The tribe disappeared as a distinct group sometime after 1931.

As the numbers of Great Andamanese progressively declined over the succeeding decades, the various Great Andamanese tribes either disappeared altogether or became amalgamated through intermarriage. By the 1901 census, the Pucikwar were reduced to 50, but distinctions between tribal groups and subgroups had become considerably blurred (and some intermarriage had also occurred with Indian and Karen (Burmese) settlers). By 1994, the 38 remaining Great Andamanese who could trace their ancestry and culture back to the original tribes belonged to only three of them (Jeru, Bo, and Cari).
