= Boa Sr =

Last fluent speaker of Aka-Bo (c. 1925 – 2010)

- Born: c. 1925; Andaman and Nicobar Islands, British India
- Died: 26 January 2010 (aged 84–85); Port Blair, Andaman and Nicobar Islands, India

Boa Sr (c. 1925 – 26 January 2010) was an Indian Great Andamanese elder. She was the last person fluent in the Aka-Bo language.

Boa Sr is not to be confused with another Great Andamanese tribal member, Boa Jr; the two women were not directly related. Boa Jr's late mother, Boro (who was also the last speaker of her language, Aka-Kora) was Boa Sr's best friend and named her daughter in her honor.

== Biography ==
Boa was born around 1925. Her mother, To, belonged to the Bo people and her father, Renge, belonged to the Jeru people. Boa's early life was spent in Mayabunder, a town on Middle Andaman Island. She was married at a young age to Nao Jer, another member of her father's people, although he predeceased her. She regarded the Jeru language as her mother tongue.

Boa Sr. lived through the epidemic brought by the British to the Andaman and Nicobar Islands, which devastated the Great Andamanese population, and also through the Japanese occupation of the Andaman Islands during World War II. In the 1970s, she and other Great Andamanese were forcibly relocated by the government of India to Strait Island, a small tribal reserve east of Baratang Island.

Boa Sr. worked with Anvita Abbi, a professor of linguistics at Jawaharlal Nehru University in Delhi, since 2005. Abbi studied and recorded Boa's language and songs. Other members of the Great Andamanese speech community had difficulty understanding the songs and narratives which she knew in Bo. She also spoke the Andamanese dialect of Hindi, as well as Great Andamanese creole, a mix of the ten indigenous languages of Andamans.

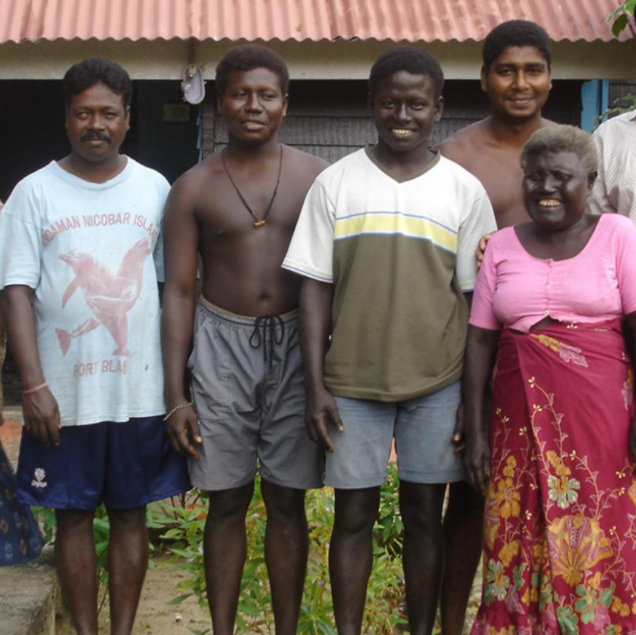
Boa Sr (right) with other Great Andamanese in 2006

Boa Sr. survived the 2004 Indian Ocean earthquake by climbing a tree. She later explained her escape: "We were all there when the earthquake came. The eldest told us the Earth would part, don't run away or move".

Boa Sr. and Nao Jer had no children. She suffered from some vision loss during her later life, but was considered to be in good health until shortly before her death in 2010.

Boa Sr. died at a hospital in Port Blair on 26 January 2010. She was the oldest living member of the Great Andamanese tribes at the time. Boa Sr.'s death left just 52 surviving Great Andamanese people in the world, none of whom could speak any Bo. Their population has fallen greatly from the estimated 5,000 Great Andamanese on the Andaman archipelago when the British arrived in 1858.

== Legacy ==
Stephen Corry, director of the British-based NGO Survival International, issued a statement saying, "With the death of Boa Sr. and the extinction of the Bo language, a unique part of human society is now just a memory. Boa's loss is a bleak reminder that we must not allow this to happen to the other tribes of the Andaman Islands". Linguist Narayan Choudhary also explained what the loss of Boa Sr. meant in both academic and personal terms, "Her loss is not just the loss of the Great Andamanese community, it is a loss of several disciplines of studies put together, including anthropology, linguistics, history, psychology, and biology. To me, Boa Sr. epitomised a totality of humanity in all its hues and with a richness that is not to be found anywhere else".
