= AKJ =

AKJ may refer to:

- Akajeru, a dialect of the Northern Andamanese language
- Akasa Air, an Indian airline
- Akhand Kirtani Jatha, a sect of Sikhism
- Asahikawa Airport, in Hokkaido, Japan
