= Kora language =

Kora language may refer to:

- the Korana language of South Africa
- the Aka-Kora language of the Andaman Islands
- The Koda language of eastern India, sometimes called Kora
