= Akabo dialect =

Extinct Great Andamanese language

Bo
- Aka-Bo
- Native to: India
- Region: Andaman Islands; east central coast of North Andaman island, North Reef island.
- Ethnicity: Bo people
- Extinct: 26 January 2010, with the death of Boa Sr.
- Language family: Great Andamanese: Northern Andamanese – Kede; Northern Andamanese; Bo

Language codes
- ISO 639-3: akm
- Glottolog: akab1248
- ELP: Aka-Bo
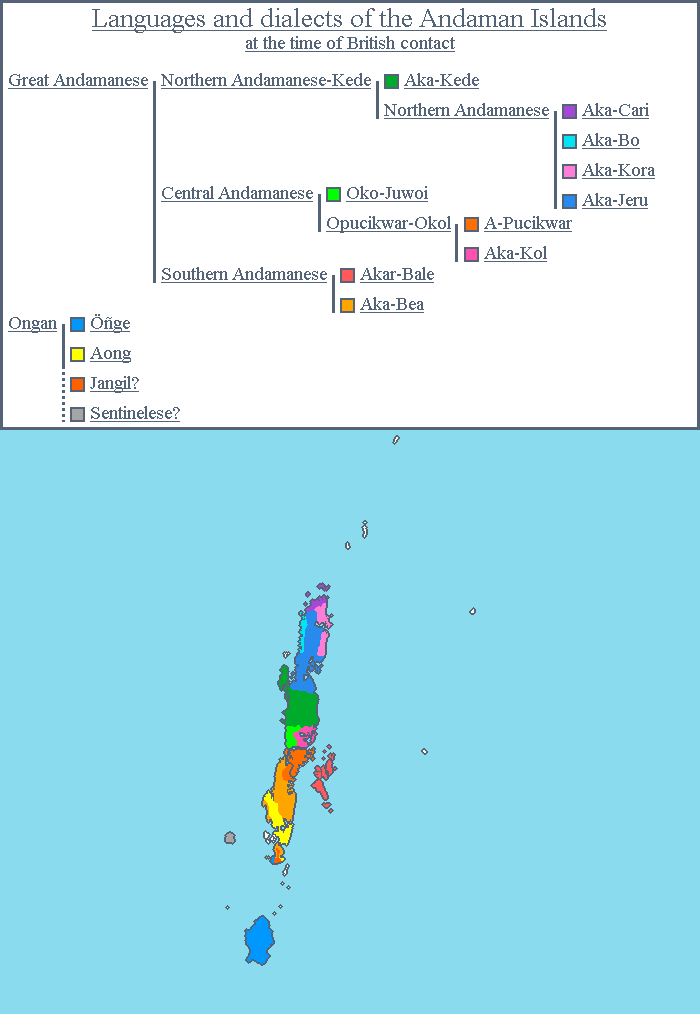
- Aka-Bo

Akabo or Bo (also known as Ba) is an extinct dialect of the Northern Andamanese language. It was spoken on the west central coast of North Andaman and on North Reef Island of the Andaman Islands in India. It was recorded as being mutually intelligible with Aka-Jeru, and the vocabularies are very similar.

== Name ==
The Aka- at the beginning of the language name is a common Great Andamanese prefix for words related to the tongue, which includes language.

== History ==
The population size of the Bo tribe in 1858 has been estimated at 200 individuals. However, they were discovered by the colonial authorities only later, in the work leading to the 1901 census. Like other Andamanese peoples, the Bo were decimated during colonial and post-colonial times, by diseases, alcohol, opium and loss of territory. The census of 1901 recorded only 48 individuals. Census takers were told that an epidemic had come from the neighboring Kari and Kora tribes, and the Bo had resorted to killing all of their own who showed symptoms. Their number was up to 62 in 1911, but then decreased to 16 in 1921 and only 6 in 1931.

In 1949, any remaining Bo were relocated, with all other surviving Great Andamanese, to a reservation on Bluff Island. In 1969 they were moved again to a reservation on Strait Island. By 1980 only three out of the 23 surviving Great Andamanese claimed to belong to the Bo tribe. By 1994 their numbers had grown to 15 (out of 40).

However, tribal identities became largely symbolic in the wake of the relocations. By 2006 the cultural and linguistic identity of the tribe had all but disappeared, due to intermarriage and other factors. The last speaker of the Bo language, a woman named Boa Sr, died at age 85 in late January, 2010.

=== Extinction ===
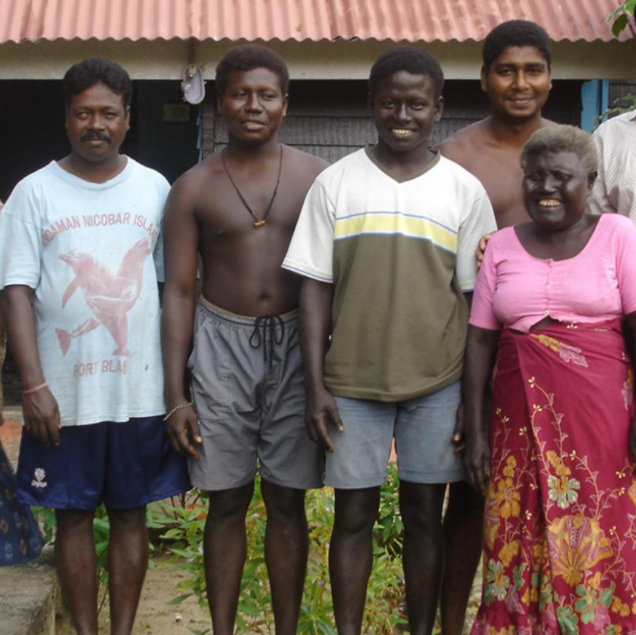
Boa Sr (right) with other Great Andamanese in 2006

Boa Sr., the last person who remembered any Bo, died on 26 January 2010, at the age of approximately 85.

Boa Sr.'s mother, who died approximately forty years before her daughter, was the only living speaker of Bo for a long time. Other members of the Great Andamanese speech community had difficulty understanding the songs and narratives which she knew in Bo. She also spoke the Andamanese dialect of Hindi, as well as Great Andamanese, a mix of the ten indigenous languages of Andamans.

Boa Sr. worked with Anvita Abbi, a professor of linguistics at Jawaharlal Nehru University in Delhi, since 2005. Abbi studied and recorded Boa's language and songs.

Boa Sr. died at a hospital in Port Blair on 26 January 2010. Boa Sr., who was approximately 85 years old, was the oldest living member of the Great Andamanese tribes at the time. Boa Sr.'s death left just 52 surviving Great Andamanese people in the world, none of whom remember any Bo. Their population is greatly reduced from the estimated 5,000 Great Andamanese living in the Andaman Islands at the time of the arrival of the British in 1858.

Stephen Corry, director of the British-based NGO Survival International, issued a statement saying, "With the death of Boa Sr. and the extinction of the Bo language, a unique part of human society is now just a memory. Boa's loss is a bleak reminder that we must not allow this to happen to the other tribes of the Andaman Islands." Linguist Narayan Choudhary also explained what the loss of Boa Sr. meant in both academic and personal terms, "Her loss is not just the loss of the Great Andamanese community, it is a loss of several disciplines of studies put together, including anthropology, linguistics, history, psychology, and biology. To me, Boa Sr. epitomised a totality of humanity in all its hues and with a richness that is not to be found anywhere else."

== Grammar ==
The Great Andamanese languages are agglutinative languages, with an extensive prefix and suffix system. They have a distinctive noun class system based largely on body parts, in which every noun and adjective may take a prefix according to which body part it is associated with (on the basis of shape, or functional association). Thus, for instance, the *aka- at the beginning of the language names is a prefix for objects related to the tongue.

Body parts are inalienably possessed, requiring a possessive adjective prefix to complete them, so one cannot say "head" alone, but only "my, or his, or your, etc. head".

Judging from the available sources, the Andamanese languages have only two cardinal numbers — one and two — and their entire numerical lexicon is one, two, one more, some more, and all.
