= Koiné language =

Contact language from mutually intelligible dialects of the same language

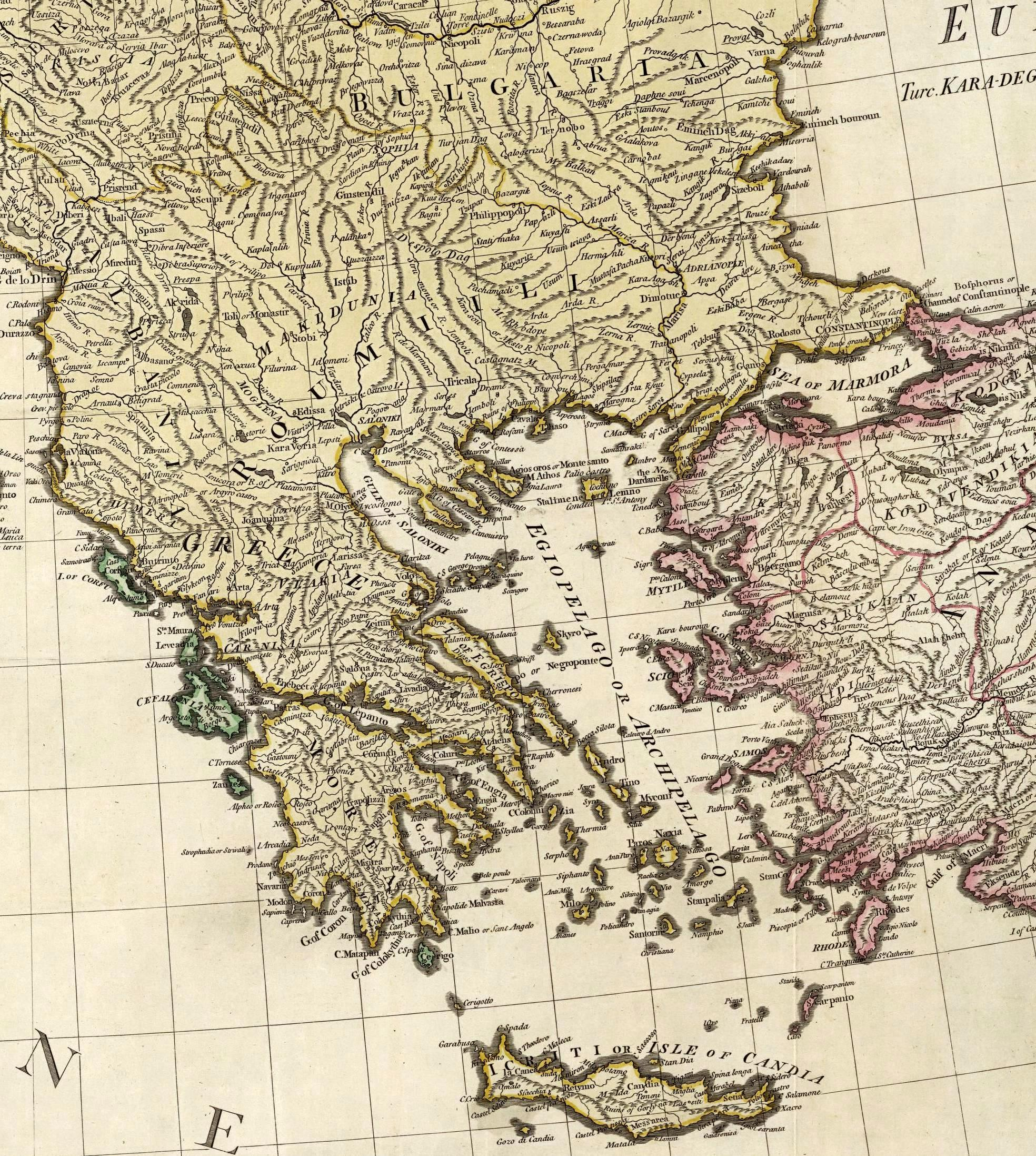
Despite their different dialects, koineization in ancient Greece enabled the various Greek political entities to maintain commercial and diplomatic relations.

In linguistics, a koine or koiné language or dialect (pronounced /ˈkɔɪ.neɪ/, KOY-nay; from Ancient Greek κοινή 'common') is a standard or common dialect that has arisen as a result of the contact, mixing, and often simplification of two or more mutually intelligible varieties of the same language.

As speakers already understood one another before the advent of the koiné, the process of koineization is not as drastic as pidginization and creolization. Unlike pidginization and creolization, there is often no prestige dialect target involved in koineization.

The normal influence between neighbouring dialects is not regarded as koineization. A koiné variety emerges as a new spoken variety in addition to the originating dialects. It does not change any existing dialect, which distinguishes koineization from the normal evolution of dialects.

While similar to zonal auxiliary languages, koiné languages arise naturally, rather than being constructed.

== Background ==
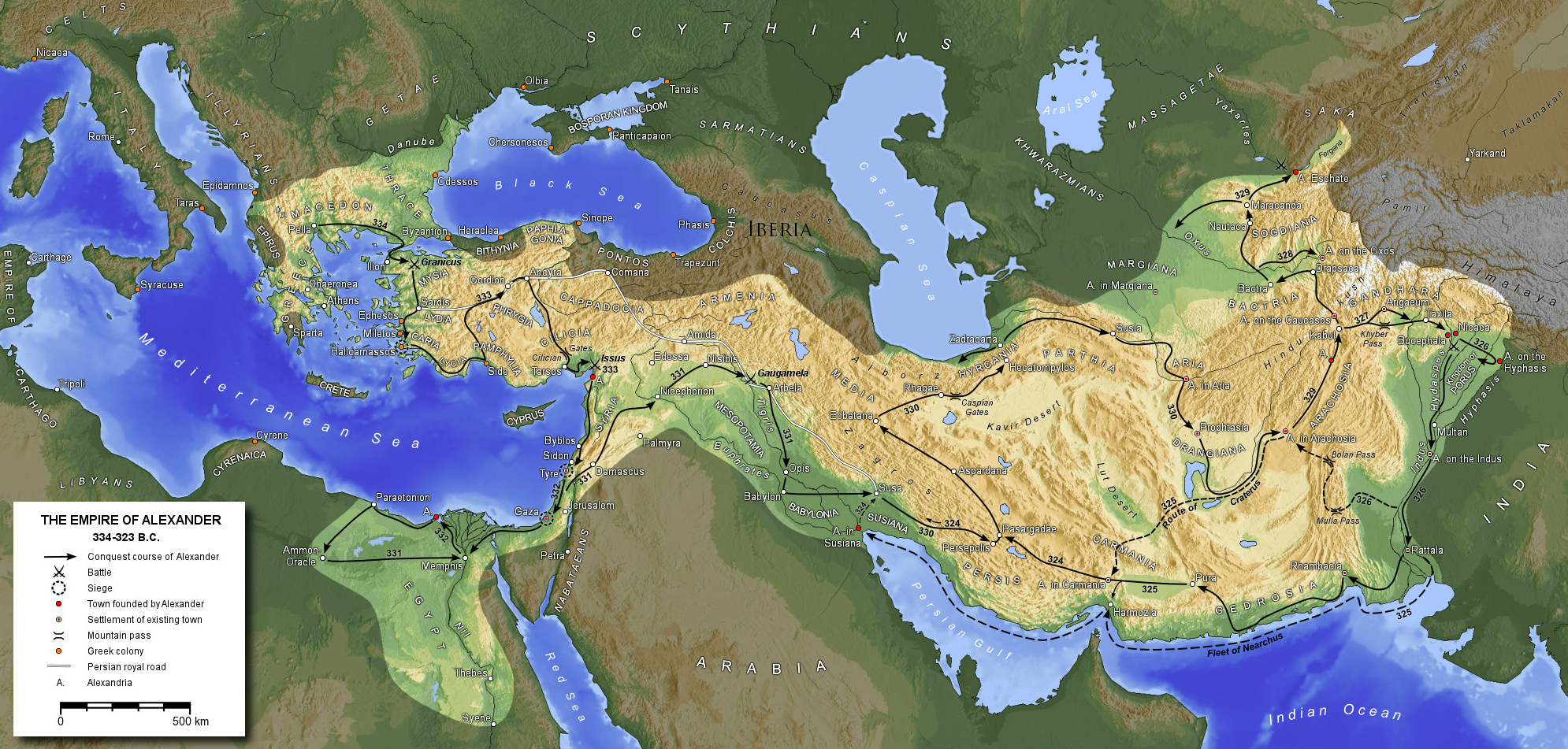
Koiné Greek became the language of the Macedonian Empire; it was widely used as a second language.

The term koine, meaning "common" in Greek, was first used to refer to the form of Greek used as a lingua franca during the Hellenistic and Roman periods. It arose as a mixed vernacular among ordinary people in the Peiraieus, the seaport of Athens, which was inhabited by Greeks from different parts of the Mediterranean.

Koineization brings new dialect varieties about as a result of contact between speakers of mutually intelligible varieties of that language. Koineization is a particular case of dialect contact, and it typically occurs in new settlements, to which people have migrated from different parts of a single language area. Koineization typically takes two or three generations to complete, but it can be achievable within the first generation.

Language variation is systematic in that it can be related to social divisions within a community, such as class and gender. Change can be shown to originate with particular social groups based on those divisions. However, a number of linguists have recently argued that language change lies with the individual.

=== Types ===
Linguist Paul Kerswill identifies two types of koinés, namely, regional and immigrant:

- A regional koiné is formed when a strong regional dialect comes into contact with dialects of speakers who move into the region. Often, the use of the koiné spreads beyond the region in which it was formed. The original koiné, of the regional variety, was based on the Attic Greek dialect that underwent a koineization process when it came into contact with other Greek dialects spoken in the Athenian seaport Piraeus. It ultimately became the lingua franca of the Hellenistic world.
- An immigrant koiné is a new dialect that forms in a community settled by immigrants speaking two or more mutually intelligible dialects of the same language. In the late 19th and the early 20th centuries, speakers of a variety of Hindi dialects were conscripted to serve as indentured labourers throughout the colonial world. Speakers of the dialects came together in varying proportions under different conditions and developed distinctive Hindi koinés. Those Hindi/Bhojpuri dialects are found in Fiji, Guyana, Mauritius, South Africa, Suriname, and Trinidad and Tobago.

== Koineization ==
Kerswill also examined the Norwegian dialects that emerged in two towns around smelters built at the head of the Sørfjord branch of the Hardangerfjord in the mid-20th century. Both towns, Odda and Tyssedal, drew migrants from different parts of Norway. The workers in Odda came predominantly (86%) from western Norway. In Tyssedal, only about one third came from western Norway, another third came from eastern Norway and the other third from other parts of the country. The dialects that evolved in both towns were thus very different from each other.

Peter Trudgill sees three processes in operation during what Mesthrie calls the accommodation period: mixing, levelling and simplification. The processes of levelling and simplification are both dependent on a wide range of factors, including the relative prestige of the contributing dialects, socio-political contexts in which the new dialect develops, and individual networks of adults involved in the accommodation process. Additionally, both Trudgill and Mesthrie also comment on the process of reallocation in which features that have been retained from contributing dialects take on new meanings or functions within the new dialect.

Trudgill posits a multigenerational model of the development of a koine. During the first (immigrant) generation, the speakers of the contributing dialects mix, and there is some levelling. The first native-born generation of speakers continues the leveling process. However, in the instances that Trudgill was able to document (such as first-generation speakers of Tyssedal and Odda dialects of Norwegian), the speech of that generation still reflected considerable variability in use of marked forms, both between speakers and in the repertoire of individual speakers.

It is the third generation that focuses the variations and stabilizes the dialect. Trudgill admits cases in which the focusing takes place in the first generation of native-born speakers and also instances that might be only in the fourth or even later generations. The dialect in its emerging state, a state marked by the heterogeneity of forms, is called by Trudgill an interdialect and is often called an interlanguage in other dialect studies.

== Examples of Koiné dialects and languages ==
=== Koiné dialects ===
- Australian English, a dialect that initially emerged as a mixture of 18th-century Cockney English and Irish English, and was subsequently influenced to some degree by Received Pronunciation in the 19th century.
- Central Asian Korean (Koryo-mar), based on Yukjin dialect and multiple other varieties of Northeastern Korean.
- Iraqi Koine, a variety of Suret language based on the various mountain dialects in Turkey and northern Iraq (i.e. Tyari, Jilu, Nochiya etc.) under the influence of the standard Urmežnaya variety (in Iran). In layman's terms, the dialect is a compromise between the thicker "low-class" accents of the mountains (Tyari) and the prestigious "posh" dialect of Urmia. Iraqi Koine was developed in the urban areas of Iraq (Baghdad, Basra, Habbaniya, and Kirkuk), where the Assyrians immigrated to.

=== Koiné languages ===
- Fiji Hindi
- Caribbean Hindustani
- Dano-Norwegian, the basis of Norway's most widely-used written standard, Bokmål.
- Hutterite German
- Koiné Greek, the language that has given name to the general phenomenon.
- Modern Hebrew, which is unique in being a temporal koine of different stages of the Hebrew language.
- Musi, also known as Palembang Malay, spoken in South Sumatra.
- N'Ko, which is both a script and an emerging literary version of the Manding languages.
- Great Andamanese koine, mixed Khora–Bo–Jeru–Sare on a Jeru base
- Amoy Hokkien and Taiwanese Hokkien, both mutually intelligible and sometimes known as "Standard Hokkien", had developed from a mixture of Quanzhou dialects and Zhangzhou dialects into a Koine of the Hokkien language.
- Guanhua was spoken within the royal courts of the Ming and Qing dynasties, based on multiple northern Mandarin dialects, later evolving into Modern Standard Mandarin. The result of dialect mixing is irregular readings of many characters, especially those with previous checked tones.

== See also ==
- Dialect continuum
- Dialect levelling
- Language shift
- Lingua franca
- Mixed language
- Mutual intelligibility
- Naturalistic planned language
- Post-creole speech continuum
- Standard language

== Sources ==
- Britain, D; Trudgill, Peter (1999), "Migration, new-dialect formation and sociolinguistic refunctionalisation: Reallocation as an outcome of dialect contact.", Transactions of the Philological Society, 97 (2): 245–256, doi:10.1111/1467-968x.00050
- Kerswill, P., "Koineization and Accommodation" (PDF), in Trudgill, Peter; Schilling-Estes, N (eds.), The handbook of language variation and change, Oxford: Blackwell Publishing, pp. 669–702
- McWhorter, John H. (1998), "Identifying the creole prototype: Vindicating a typological class", Language, 74 (4): 788–818, doi:10.2307/417003, JSTOR 417003
- Mesthrie, R. (2001), "Koinés", in Mesthrie, R. (ed.), Concise encyclopedia of sociolinguistics, Amsterdam: Elsevier, pp. 485–489
- Siegel, Jeff (1985), "Koines and koineization.", Language in Society, 14 (3): 357–378, doi:10.1017/s0047404500011313, S2CID 12830293
- Trudgill, Peter (1986), Dialects in contact, Oxford: Blackwell Publishing
- Weinreich, Uriel (1953). Languages in Contact: Findings and Problems. ISBN 9783110802177.
