= Bo people (Andaman) =

Great Andamanese tribe

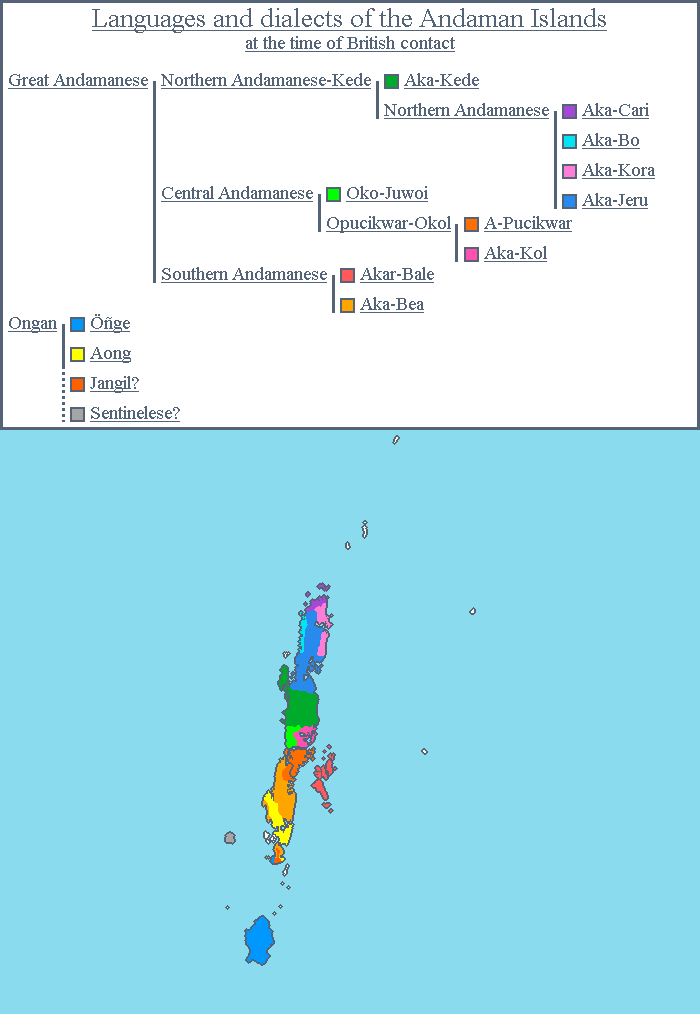
Territory of the Bo (Aka-Bo) and other Andamanese peoples at the time of British contact.

The Bo were one of the ten indigenous tribes of the Great Andamanese people, originally living on the western coast of North Andaman Island in the Indian Ocean.

The tribe spoke the Akabo dialect, closely related to other dialects of the Northern Andamanese language. The native name for the language was Akabo ( Aka- being a prefix for "tongue"); and this name is often used for the tribe itself. They were mostly forest-dwellers (eremtaga) with a smaller number of shore-dwellers (aryoto). They are a designated Scheduled Tribe.

There are still a handful of people who identify themselves as members of the tribe living on a reservation on Strait Island, but none can speak the original language.

== History ==
The original size of the Bo tribe, by 1858, has been estimated at 200 individuals. However, they were discovered by the British only later, in the work leading to the 1901 census. Like other Andamanese peoples, the Bo were decimated during colonial and post-colonial times, by diseases, alcohol, colonial warfare, and loss of territory. The census of 1901 recorded only 48 individuals. Census takers were told that an epidemic had come from the neighboring Kari and Kora tribes, and the Bo had resorted to killing all of their own who showed symptoms. Their number was up to 62 in 1911, then decreased to 16 in 1921 and only 6 in 1931.

In 1949, any remaining Bo was relocated, with all other surviving Great Andamanese, to a reservation on Bluff Island. In 1969 they were moved again to a reservation on Strait Island. By 1980 only three out of the 23 surviving Great Andamanese claimed to belong to the Bo tribe. By 1994 their numbers had grown to 15 (out of 40).

However, tribal identities became largely symbolic in the wake of the relocations. By 2006 the cultural and linguistic identity of the tribe had all but disappeared, due to intermarriage and other factors. The last speaker of the Bo language, a woman named Boa Sr, died at age 85 in late January 2010.
