= Badra =

Badra may refer to:

- Badra, Germany, a city in Germany
- Badra, India, a city in India
- Badra, Iran, a city in western Iran
- Badra, Iraq, a city in eastern Iraq
