= Indo-Portuguese Creole of Bombay =

Dead creole language of India

The Indo-Portuguese Creole of Bombay was a creole language based on Portuguese, which grew out of the long contact between the Portuguese and local languages such as Konkani, Marathi & Gujarati. Currently this language is extinct. It was spoken in Bombay (Mumbai), India: Which broadly includes Bassein (Vasai), Salsette, Taana (Trombay), Chevai, Mahim, Tecelaria, Dadar, Parel, Cavel, Bandora-Badra, Govai, Marol, Andheri, Versova, Malvan, Manori, Mazagaon. This language was, after the Ceylon creole dialect of Indo-Portuguese, the most important. In 1906 there were still close to 5,000 people who spoke Portuguese creole as their mother tongue, 2,000 in Mumbai and Mahim, 1000 in Bandora, 500 in Thana, 100 in Curla (Kurla), 50 in Bassein (Vasai) and 1,000 in other towns. There were, at that time, schools that taught the creole and the rich classes, which were replaced by the English language.

== See also ==
- Portuguese-based creole languages
- Indo-Portuguese creoles
