= Kora people =

Tribe of Andaman Islands, India

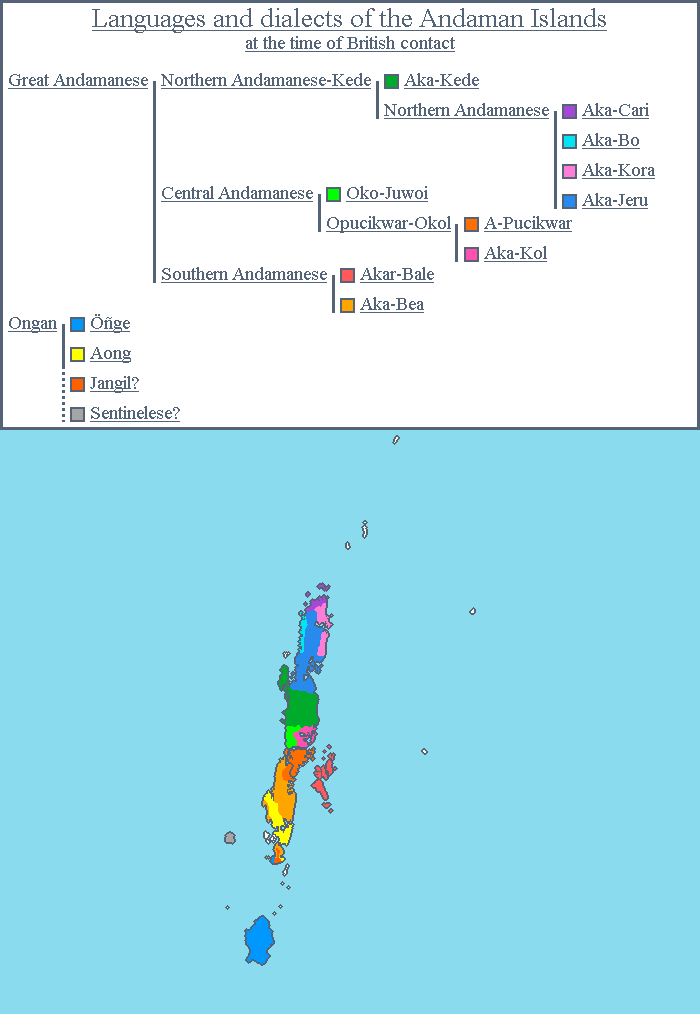
Territory of the Kora (Aka-Kora) and other Andamanese peoples at the time of British contact.

The Kora, Khora or Cora were one of the ten Indigenous tribes of the Great Andamanese people, originally living on the eastern part of North Andaman Island in the Indian Ocean. The tribe is now extinct, although some of the remaining Great Andamanese on Strait Island claim to have Kora ancestors.

The tribe spoke the Akakhora dialect, closely related to other dialects of the Northern Andamanese language. The native name for the language was Aka-Kora, also spelled Aka-Khora or Aka-Cora (Aka- being a prefix for "tongue"); and this name is often used for the tribe itself. They were divided between shore-dwellers (aryoto) and forest-dwellers (eremtaga) subtribes.

== History ==
By the time of the first permanent British settlement at Port Blair (1858), the estimated size of the Kora tribe was about 500 individuals, out of perhaps 3500 Great Andamanese. However the tribe was discovered only much later, in the work leading to the 1901 census. Like other Andamanese peoples, the Kora were decimated during colonial and post-colonial times, by diseases, alcohol, colonial warfare and loss of territory. The census of 1901 recorded 96 individuals, which decreased to 71 in 1911, 48 in 1921, and 24 in 1931.

In 1949, any remaining Kora were relocated, with all other surviving Great Andamanese, to a reservation on Bluff island. In 1969 they were relocated again to a reservation on Strait Island.

By 1980 only one person claimed to be a Kora member, and 1994 the Kora tribe no longer existed as a separate unit. Although descendants of the Kora were still living in the Great Andamanese reservation of Strait Island as of 2006, they identified themselves as members of other tribes, mainly Jeru. The last known speaker of the Kora language died in November 2009. They were a designated Scheduled Tribe.
