= Hukumina language =

Extinct Austronesian language

Hukumina
- Bambaa
- Native to: Indonesia
- Region: Buru Island, Moluccas
- Extinct: after 1989
- Language family: Austronesian: Malayo-Polynesian; Central–Eastern; Central Maluku; Sula–Buru; Buru; Hukumina
- Dialects: Bara; Palumata †

Language codes
- ISO 639-3: huw
- Glottolog: huku1237
- ELP: Hukumina

Hukumina (also called Bambaa) is an extinct Austronesian language recently spoken in the northwest of Buru Island in the Maluku Islands of eastern Indonesia. It had one native speaker in 1989.
