= Ongkor Solon =

Language

- Onkor Solon, Jungarian, Sinkiang Solon, Turkestan Solon, Xinjian Solon
- Native to: China
- Region: Dzungaria, Xinjiang
- Ethnicity: Ongkor Solons
- Extinct: 1990s
- Language family: Tungusic: Northern; Ewenic; Evenki group; Evenki; Manchurian Evenki; Solon; Ongkor Solon

Language codes
- ISO 639-3: –
- Glottolog: ongk1234
- ELP: Ongkor Solon
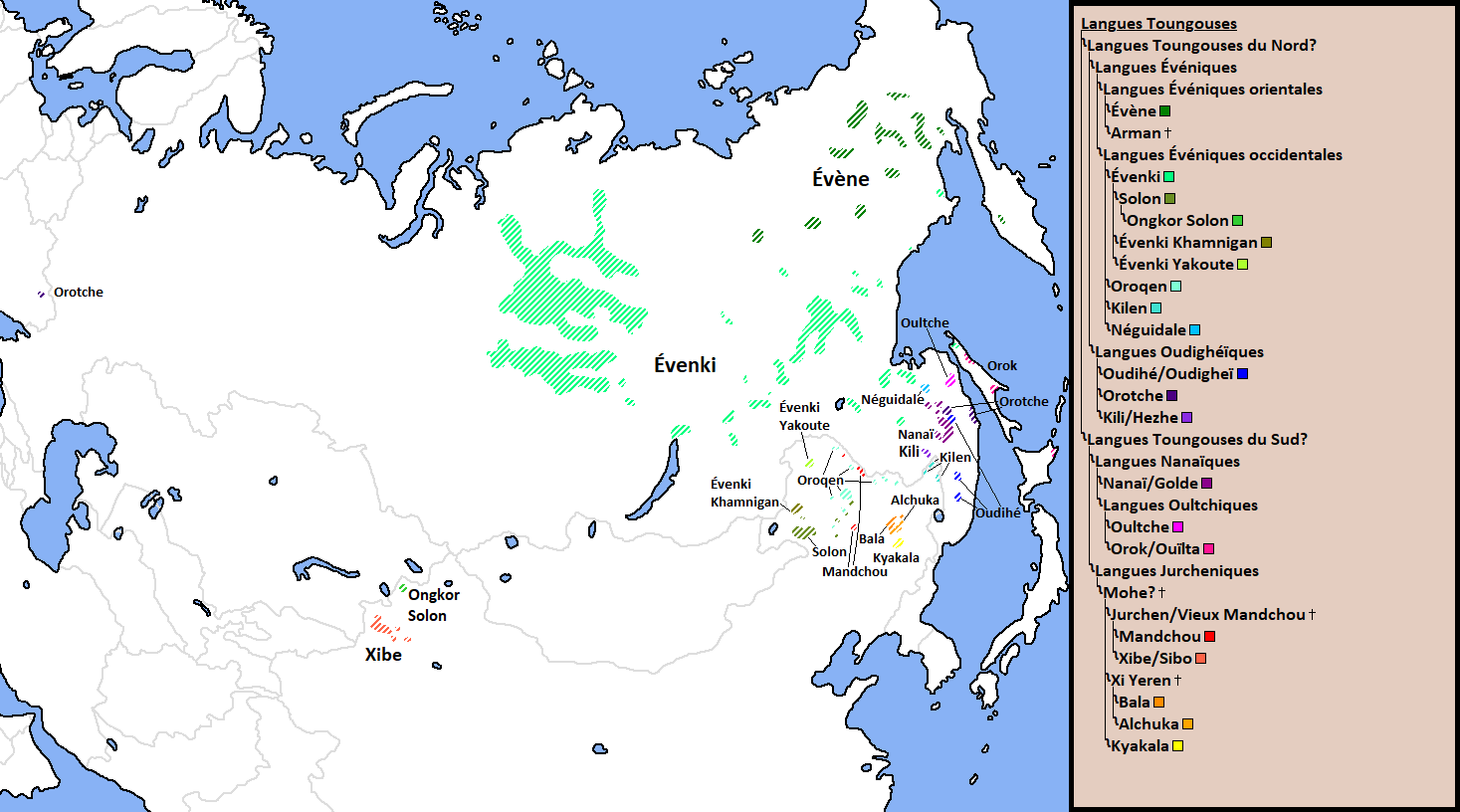
- Map of the Tungusic languages. Ongkor Solon

- Ongkor Solon is classified as Extinct by the UNESCO Atlas of the World's Languages in Danger.

Ongkor Solon (also known as Jungarian, and Turkestan Solon) is an extinct Solon dialect or Tungusic language spoken in Ili Kazakh Autonomous Prefecture, Xinjiang, China. The dialect was primarily used in private settings. According to the UNESCO Atlas of the World's Languages in Danger Ongkor Solon has gone extinct.

== Classification ==
Ongkor Solon is a language or dialect derived from Solon which it separated from in 1763 as a diaspora group. Solon itself is a language or dialect of Manchurian Evenki, which is a dialect group of the Evenki language. The latter is also a language of the Ewenic group of Tungusic languages.

Turkestan Solon has been considered a separate dialect of Solon from Ongkor Solon, but likely are identical dialects.

== Status ==
According to the Glottolog, the dialect is critically endangered and nearly extinct. There are fewer than 20 Ongkor Solon speakers, who also speak other dialects, such as Dagur, Kazakh, Uyghur and Mandarin.

At 1990, only one native speaker has remained, with another native speaker passing away at the age of 79. At the time, the dialect was not taught in schools. The last speaker of Ongkor Solon was a 79-year-old man as of 1990. In addition to this speaker, other people have some knowledge of the dialect.

== Loanwords ==
=== Dagur ===
The following are Dagur loanwords that were used inside both Ongkor Solon and Turkestan Solon with English and regular Solon words by Peter Sauli Piispanen.

| English | Solon | Dagur | Ongkor Solon | Turkestan Solon |
|---|---|---|---|---|
| ox | e̮ggē̮l | ergel | e̮rge̮l | ergel |
| to close, to lock, to shut | axu- ~ ahu- | haagu | axume | axu- |
| to move slowly | gɯrge̮lbɯ̄ | hurbelgu | gu̇rgu̇lıme | gurgule- |
| to shave | xandā- ~ handā- | xandaa- | xandāme | xanda- |
| cattle | | aduus | adǝ̑sūn | adsṇ |
| to meet, to join | ōlži- | (e̮mundur) aold’zime | adǝ̑sūn | auldi- |
| lark | | beldur | bⁱāldur | b’aldur |
| letter, book | bite̮g ~ bitig | biteg ~ bitäg | bitik | b’itix |
| saucer, plate | | d’aas | di̭as | d’ase, d’aze |
| pink | | kauvu | xaṷgu | xaūg ~ xaug |
| to dig | | koŋk’gu | xuŋkīme | xuŋki- |
| to brush, to rub (ink) | | xiŋkijgu ~ xiingkigu | īŋkıme | |
| pipe tobacco | | dangga | dȧmgi | damga ~ damg(i) |
| bug | sɯ̄sɯ̄ ɯ̄ | čeučun | soṷsū | |
| cap, cover | | dajb | dai̭ib | daib |
| window | | čonko ~ čoŋku | soŋkxo | soŋxo ~ soŋkŏ |

=== Other Mongolic ===
The following are Mongolic loanwords that were used inside both Ongkor Solon and Turkestan Solon with English and regular Solon words by Peter Sauli Piispanen.

| English | Solon | Ongkor Solon | Turkestan Solon | Mongolic | Mongolian |
|---|---|---|---|---|---|
| (to grow) rich | bai̭ǯi- ~ bajaǯi- | bai̭ăn | bajan | *bajaǯi | |
| to wish, to want | | dorlame | dorol’a- ~ durul’a- | | durla- |
| gluttonous, greedy, hungry | | xomxŏ | | *komu-kai | |

== Glossary ==
The following are Ongkor Solon and Turkestan Solon words with English words by Peter Sauli Piispanen.

| English | Ongkor Solon | Turkestan Solon |
|---|---|---|
| lizard | iśil | |
| fathom, thread | dār | dar(a) |
| to cut off | d’žigıme | |
| to come | e̮me̮me | eme- ~ emu- |
| to wash | śilkıme | |
| pig | t’ōrki | torki |
| calf | t’uksan | tuxšan |
| to sow | u̇ru̇me | ur’, ure |

== Bibliography ==
- Piispanen, Peter Sauli (2019). Languages in Contact: Solon and Dagur. Stockholm: Academia.edu.
