= Okojuwoi =

Extinct Great Andamanese language of India

Juwoi
- Oko-Juwoi
- Native to: India
- Region: Andaman Islands; west central and southwest interior Middle Andaman Island.
- Ethnicity: Juwoi
- Extinct: by 1931
- Language family: Great Andamanese: Central Andamanese; Juwoi

Language codes
- ISO 639-3: okj
- Glottolog: okoj1239
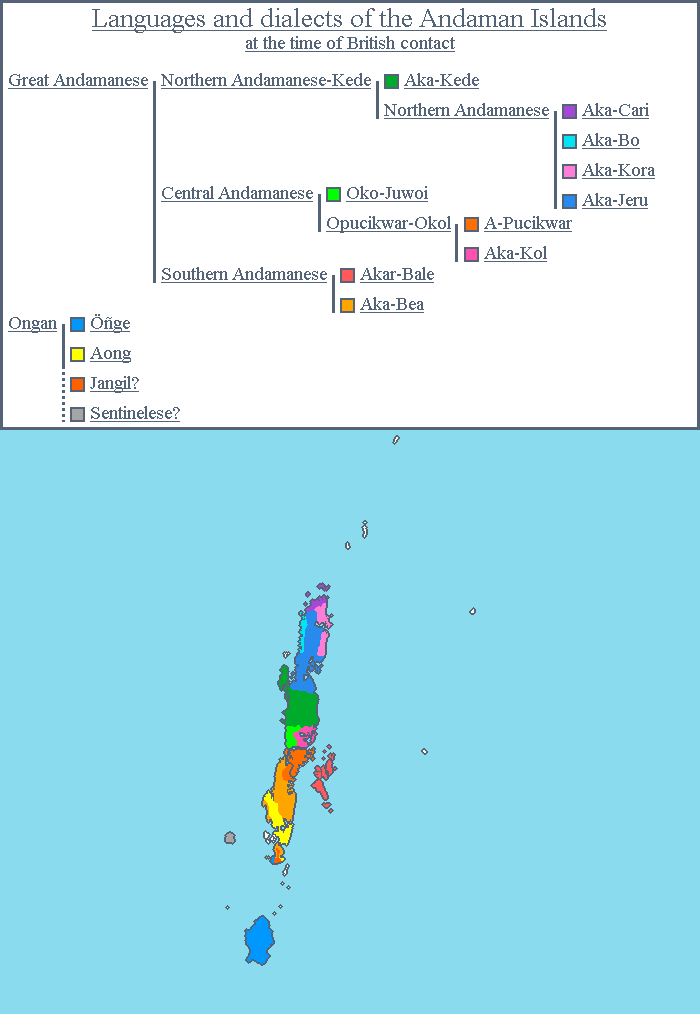
- Oko-Juwoi

The Juwoi language, Oko-Juwoi (also Junoi), is an extinct Great Andamanese language, of the Central group. It was spoken in the west central and southwest interior of Middle Andaman by the Juwoi people.

== History ==
The Juwoi were one of the indigenous peoples of the Andaman Islands, one of the ten or so Great Andamanese tribes identified by British colonials in the 1860s. Their language was closely related to the other Great Andamanese languages. They were extinct as a distinct people by 1931.

== Grammar ==
The Great Andamanese languages are agglutinative languages, with an extensive prefix and suffix system. They have a distinctive noun class system based largely on body parts, in which every noun and adjective may take a prefix according to which body part it is associated with (on the basis of shape, or functional association). Thus, for instance, the *aka- at the beginning of the language names is a prefix for objects related to the tongue.

The prefixes are,

	Juwoi
head/heart	ôto-
hand/foot	ôn-
mouth/tongue	ókô-
torso (shoulder to shins)	a-
eye/face/arm/breast	re-
back/leg/butt	ra-
waist	

Body parts are inalienably possessed, requiring a possessive adjective prefix to complete them, so one cannot say "head" alone, but only "my, or his, or your, etc. head".

The basic pronouns are almost identical throughout the Great Andamanese languages.

'This' and 'that' are distinguished as k- and t-.

Judging from the available sources, the Andamanese languages have only two cardinal numbers — one and two — and their entire numerical lexicon is one, two, one more, some more, and all.

== Sample ==
As an example, we give part of a creation myth in Oko-Juwoi, reminiscent of Prometheus:

Kuro-t'on-mik-a Mom Mirit-la, Bilik l'ôkô-ema-t, peakar at-lo top-chike at laiche Lech-lin a, kotik a ôko-kodak-chine at-lo Karat-tatak-emi-in.
Kuro-t'on-mik-in Mr. Pigeon, God ?-slep-t, wood fire-with stealing-was fire the.late Lech-to he, then he ?-fire-make-did fire-with Karat-tatak-emi-at.
Mr. Pigeon stole a firebrand at Kuro-t'on-mika, while God was sleeping. He gave the brand to the late Lech, who then made fires at Karat-tatak-emi. (Translated by Portman)
