= Akajeru =

Nearly extinct Great Andamanese language

Jeru
- Aka-Jeru
- Native to: India
- Region: Andaman Islands; interior and south North Andaman island, Sound island. Presently Strait Island
- Ethnicity: Jeru
- Native speakers: 3 (2020)
- Language family: Great Andamanese: Northern Andamanese – Kede; Northern Andamanese; Jeru
- Writing system: Devanagari

Language codes
- ISO 639-3: akj
- Glottolog: akaj1239
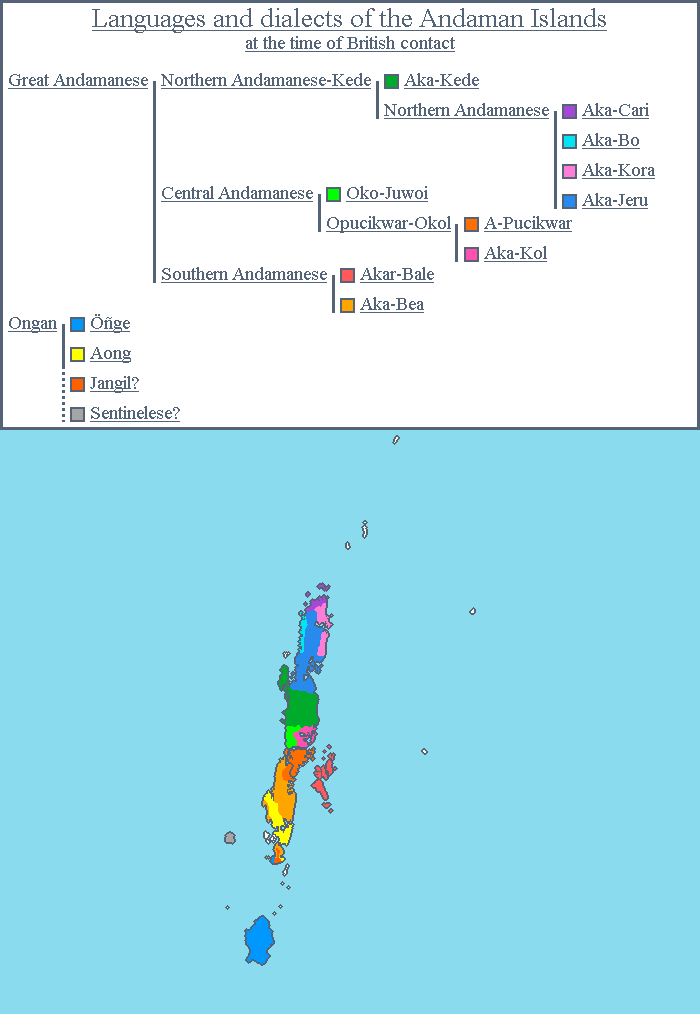
- Aka-Jeru

- Great andamanese [sic] is classified as Critically Endangered according to the UNESCO Atlas of the World's Languages in Danger

Jeru, or Akajeru (also known as Yerawa), is a moribund dialect of the Northern Andamanese language, and the last surviving variety of the Great Andamanese language family. Jeru was spoken in the interior and south coast of North Andaman and on Sound Island. A koiné of the Northern Andamanese dialects, based principally on Akajeru, was once spoken on Strait Island; the last semi-fluent speaker of this, Nao Jr., died in 2009.

Akajeru, Akachari, Akakhora and Akabo were dialects of a singular language, termed Northern Andamanese, with lexical correspondency between Akajeru and Akachari at 93%.

== History ==
As the numbers of Great Andamanese progressively declined over the succeeding decades, the various Great Andamanese tribes either disappeared altogether or became amalgamated through intermarriage. By 1994, the 38 remaining Great Andamanese who could trace their ancestry and culture back to the original tribes belonged to only three of them (Jeru, Bo, and Cari).

The resulting mixture produced a koiné of the dialects of Northern Andamanese, based principally on Jeru. The last fluent speaker, Nao, died in 2009.

== Phonology ==
=== Consonants ===
Aka-Jeru has the following consonants:

		Labial	Dental	Alveolar	Retroflex	Palatal	Velar
Nasal		m		n		ɲ	ŋ
Plosive	voiceless	p	t		ʈ		k
Plosive	voiceless aspirated	pʰ	tʰ		ʈʰ		kʰ
Plosive	voiced	b	d		ɖ		
Affricate	voiceless					tʃ	
Affricate	voiced					dʒ	
Fricative							
Rhotic				r			
Approximant				l		j	

=== Vowels ===
Aka-Jeru has the following vowels:

	Front		Central		Back	
	short	long	short	long	short	long
Close	i	iː			u	uː
Close-mid	e	eː			o	oː
Open-mid	ɛ	ɛː			ɔ	ɔː
Open			a	aː		

== Grammar ==
See Great Andamanese languages for more general grammatical description.

Proclitics based on words for parts of the body pervade the grammatical system of the language, a pattern not attested from any other known language.

Seven basic zones in the partonomy of the body and grammaticalisation process in Akajeru
Classes	Partonomy of human body	Body division markers	Verbs	Adjectives	Adverbs
1	mouth and its semantic extension	a=	mouth-related activity, origin, e.g. a=ɟire 'abuse', a=kopho 'sprout'	mouth-related attributive quality of a person, e.g. a=mu 'mute', a=tutlup 'greedy'	deictic meaning of front or back, anteriority of an action, e.g. a=karap 'behind', a=kaulu 'prior to'
2	major external body parts	ɛr=	activity in which the front part of the body is involved. e.g. er=luk 'weigh'	attribute of size, external beauty, e.g. er=buŋoi 'beautiful'	deictic meaning of adjacency, uncontrollable actions/emotions, e.g. er=betto:ʃo 'adjacent to/near X', er=achil 'surprised'
3	extreme ends of the body like toes and fingernails	oŋ=	hand-related activity, action to do with extremities of body, e.g. oŋ=cho 'stitch', oŋ=tuɟuro 'trembling of hands'	attributes related to limbs, e.g. oŋ=karacay 'lame', 'handicapped', oŋ=toplo 'alone'	Indicating manner, e.g. oŋ=kocil 'fast', 'hurriedly'
4	bodily products and part-whole relationship	ut=	directional, away from the ego, experiential, e.g. ut=cone 'leave', ut=ʈheʈhe-bom 'be hungry'	attributive quality of an X after a part is taken out of it, e.g. ut=lile 'decay', ut=lɔkho 'bare'	emerging out of something, deictic meaning of 'towards X', e.g. ot=le, 'seaward' ot=bo 'backwards'
5	organs inside the body	e=, ɛ=	internalised action, when the effect of an action can be seen on the object, or experienced, e.g. e=lɛco 'suck', ɛ=rino 'tear'	inherent attribute of X, e.g. e=sare 'salty', ɛ=bɛn 'soft'	deictic meaning of 'in the middle of X' e.g. te=khil, e=kotra 'inside'
6	parts designating round shape/sexual organs	ara=	action that involves side or middle portion of the body, e.g. ara=ɖelo 'be pregnant'	attribute of size, 'time' and belly-related, e.g. ara=pheʈkhetɔ 'big bellied', ara=kaʈa 'stout/dwarf'	deixis of immediate vertical or horizontal space, e.g. ara=balo 'behind X', tara=tal 'right under X'
7	parts for legs and related terms	o= ~ ɔ=	action which results in roundish object or in a definite result, e.g. o=cɔrno 'make nest', o=beo 'sting'	external attribute of an X, shape or structure, e.g. o=baloŋ 'round', o=phelala 'slippery'	temporal deixis relating to 'sun rise' or directional deixis, e.g. o=ʈɔ: 'day break', o=kara 'sunset'

== Sample text ==
The following is a sample text in Present Great Andamanese, in Devanagari, the Latin script, and IPA.

कूरोतोनमीका मोम मीरीतलाऽ, बीलीक लौकौएमात, पेआकार आतलो तोपछीके आत लैचे लेछलीन आ, कोतीक आ औकौकोडाऽकछीने आतलो कारातताऽताकेमीऽन।
Kuro-t'on-mika mom miritlaa, bilik laukoemat, peakar aatlo topchhike aat laiche lechhlin aa, kotik aa aukaukodaakchhine aatlo Karat-tatak-emin.
kurot̪onmikɑ mom mirit̪lɑː, bilik lɔkɔemɑt̪, peɑkɑr ɑt̪lo topcʰike ɑt lɑice lecʰlin ɑ, kot̪ik ɑ ɔkɔkodɑːkcʰine ɑt̪lo kɑrɑt̪t̪ɑːt̪ɑkemiːn.
Mr. Pigeon stole a firebrand at Kuro-t'on-mika, while God was sleeping. He gave the brand to the late Lech, who then made fires at Karat-tatak-emin.

== Bibliography ==
- Raoul Zamponi; Bernard Comrie (2021). A Grammar of Akajeru: Fragments of a traditional North Andamanese dialect. London: UCL Press. doi:10.14324/111.9781800080935. ISBN 978-90-04-23527-4.
