= Palumata language =

Unattested extinct language formerly spoken on Buru Island

Palumata
- Balamata, Palamata
- (unattested)
- Native to: Indonesia, Maluku
- Region: Buru Island
- Extinct: (date missing)
- Language family: Austronesian: Malayo-Polynesian; Central–Eastern; Central Maluku; Sula–Buru; Buru; Hukumina; Palumata

Language codes
- ISO 639-3: pmc (retired)
- Glottolog: palu1237

Palumata is an extinct and unattested language. It is believed to have been very closely related to the Austronesian language Hukumina, and perhaps a dialect of it.
