= Akacari =

Extinct Great Andamanese language

Cari
- Sare
- Aka-Cari
- Native to: India
- Region: Andaman Islands; north coast of North Andaman Island, Landfall Island, other nearby small islands.
- Ethnicity: Cariar
- Extinct: 4 April 2020, with the death of Licho
- Language family: Great Andamanese: Northern Andamanese – Kede; Northern Andamanese; Cari

Language codes
- ISO 639-3: aci
- Glottolog: akac1240
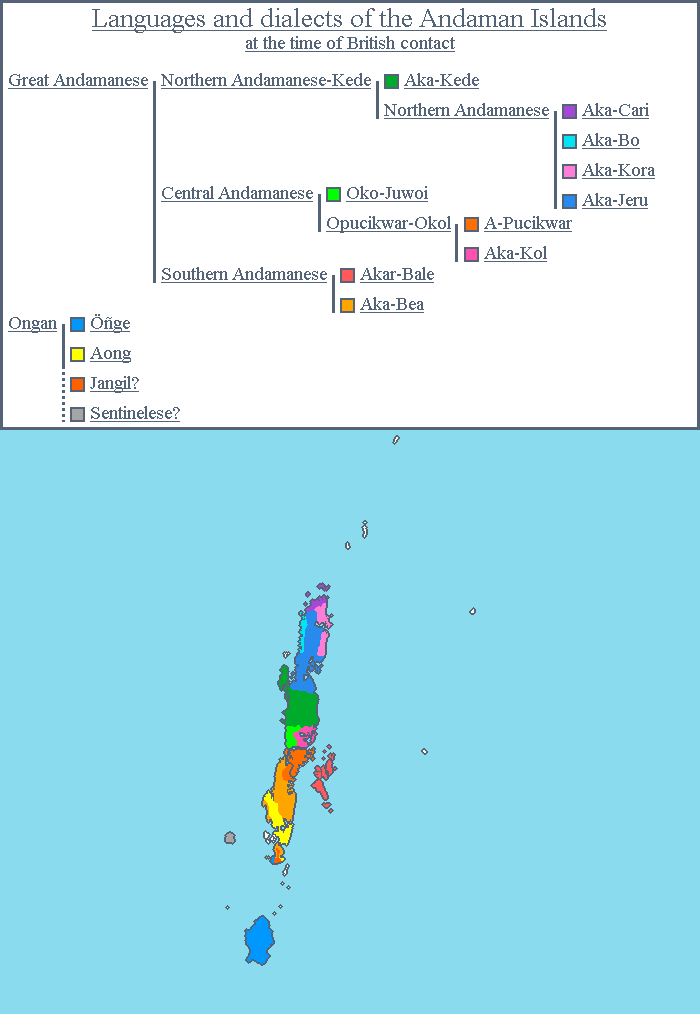
- Aka-Cari

Akachari, or Cari (occasionally 'Kari', 'Chariar' or 'Sare'), is an extinct dialect of the Northern Andamanese language that was spoken by the Cari people, one of the dozen Great Andamanese peoples.

In the 19th century, the Cari lived on the north coast of North Andaman, as well as on Landfall Island and other nearby small islands. By 1994, the population had been reduced to two women aged over 50, living with the other few surviving Great Andamanese on Strait Island. Aka-Cari became extinct with the death of Licho in April 2020.

== History ==
The Cari population at the time of first European contacts (in the 1790s) has been estimated at 100 individuals, out of perhaps 3500 Great Andamanese. Like other Andamanese peoples, the Cari were decimated during colonial and post-colonial times, by diseases, alcohol, colonial warfare and loss of territory. The population was down to 39 individuals in the 1901 census, falling to 36 in 1911, 17 in 1921, and 9 in 1931.

In 1949 any remaining Cari were relocated, together with all other surviving Great Andamanese, to a reservation on Bluff island; and then again in 1969 to a reservation on Strait Island.

By 1994, the tribe was reduced to only two women, aged 57 and 59, and therefore was on its way to extinction. The last speaker, a woman called Licho, died from chronic tuberculosis on 4 April 2020 in Shadipur, Port Blair.

They are a designated Scheduled Tribe.

== Grammar ==
The Great Andamanese languages are agglutinative languages, with an extensive prefix and suffix system. They have a distinctive noun class system based largely on body parts, in which every noun and adjective may take a prefix according to which body part it is associated with (on the basis of shape, or functional association). Thus, for instance, the *aka- at the beginning of the language names is a prefix for objects related to the tongue.

Body parts are inalienably possessed, requiring a possessive adjective prefix to complete them, so one cannot say "head" alone, but only "my, or his, or your, etc. head".

'This' and 'that' are distinguished as k- and t-.

Judging from the available sources, the Andamanese languages have only two cardinal numbers — one and two — and their entire numerical lexicon is one, two, one more, some more, and all.

== See also ==
- Great Andamanese language
