= Great Andamanese peoples =

Indigenous people in the Andaman Islands

Great Andamanese
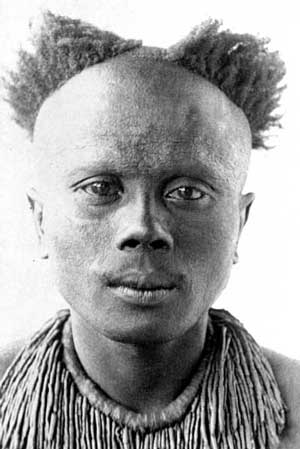
- Riala, an interpreter for the British from the Aka-Kede Tribe of Great Andamanese from Middle Andaman, in 1890

Total population
- 59 (2020)

Regions with significant populations
- India Andaman and Nicobar Islands (Strait Island): 59

Languages
- originally Great Andamanese languages, today mainly Hindi and other Indian languages, Census of India 2001

Related ethnic groups
- Onge, Jarawa, Jangil, Sentinelese

The Great Andamanese are an indigenous people of the Great Andaman archipelago in the Andaman Islands. Historically, the Great Andamanese lived throughout the archipelago, and were divided into ten major tribes. Their distinct but closely related languages comprised the Great Andamanese languages, one of the two identified Andamanese language families.

The Great Andamanese were clearly related to the other Andamanese peoples, but were well separated from them by culture, language and geography. The languages of those other four groups were only distantly related to those of the Great Andamanese and mutually unintelligible; they are classified in a separate family, the Ongan languages.

They were once the most numerous of the five major groups in the Andaman Islands with an estimated population between 2,000 and 6,600, before they were killed or died out due to diseases, alcohol, colonial warfare and loss of hunting territory. Only 52 remained as of February 2010; by August 2020 there were 59. The tribal and linguistic distinctions have largely disappeared, so they may now be considered a single Great Andamanese ethnic group with mixed Burmese, Hindi and aboriginal descent.

== Origin ==
The Great Andamanese are classified by anthropologists as one of the Negrito peoples, which also include the other four aboriginal groups of the Andaman islands (Onge, Jarawa, Jangil and Sentinelese) and five other isolated populations of Southeast Asia. The Andaman Negritos are thought to be the first inhabitants of the islands, having emigrated from the mainland tens of thousands of years ago.

Until the late 18th century, the Andamanese peoples were preserved from outside influences by their fierce rejection of contacts (which included killing any shipwrecked foreigners) and by the remoteness of the islands. Thus, the ten Great Andamanese tribes and the other four indigenous groups are thought to have diverged on their own over the course of millennia.

== Demographics ==
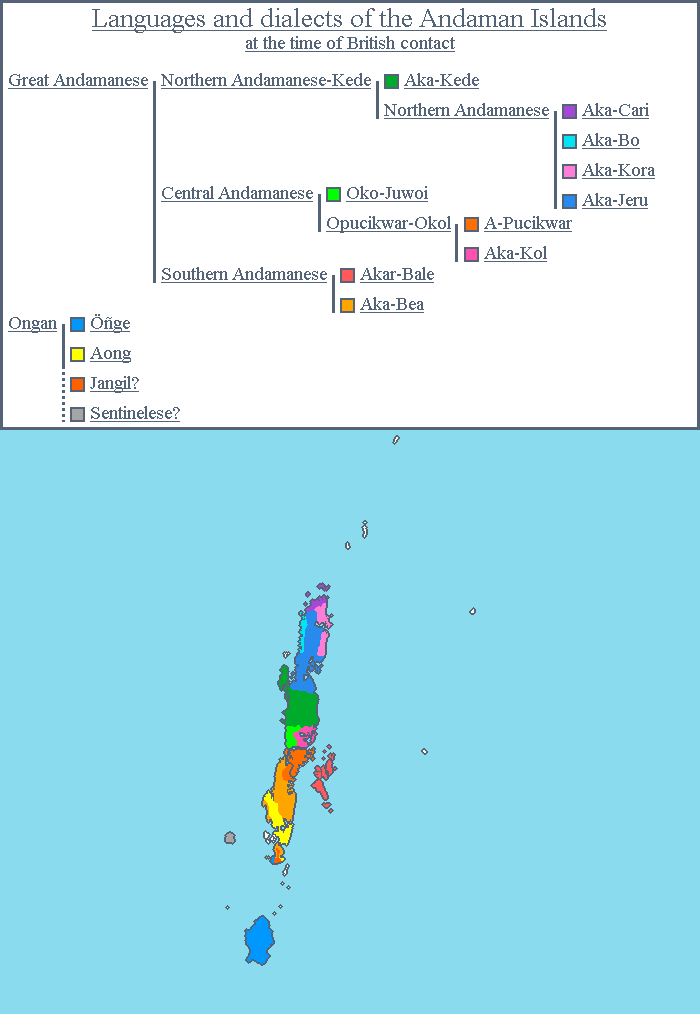
Territories of the Great Andamanese tribes, languages, and dialects and other Andamanese peoples at the time of British contact

In 1789, when the British established a colonial presence on Great Andaman, the Great Andamanese were divided into 10 main tribes with each having a distinct language, each counting between 200 and 700 individuals. Their territories spanned most of the Great Andaman islands, including Ritchie's Archipelago and Rutland Island but excluding Little Andaman (inhabited by the Onge) and the North and South Sentinel Islands (of the Sentinelese). On South Andaman the Great Andamanese coexisted with the Jarawa, and on Rutland Island with the Jangil. Arranged by territory, roughly from north to south, the original tribes were:

- Northern subgroup (Yerewa):
  - (Aka-)Kari or Cari – N of North Andaman – 2 individuals in 1994
  - (Aka-)Kora, Khora or Cora – E of North Andaman – extinct by 1994
  - (Aka-)Bo – W of North Andaman – 15 individuals in 1994
  - (Aka-)Jeru – S and central North Andaman – 19 individuals in 1994
- Southern subgroup (Bojigyab):
  - (Aka-)Kede – N of Middle Andaman – extinct soon after 1931.
  - (Aka-)Kol – SE of Middle Andaman – extinct by 1921.
  - (Oko-)Juwoi – SW of Middle Andaman – extinct by 1931
  - (A-)Pucikwar – NE of South Andaman and Baratang – extinct soon after 1931.
  - (Akar-)Bale – Ritchie's Archipelago – extinct soon after 1931.
  - (Aka-)Bea – coast of South Andaman and Rutland Island – extinct by 1931.

(The prefixed forms of the names actually refer to the respective languages, but they are often used for the tribes themselves.) By 1994 there were also four Great Andamanese individuals with no tribal affiliation.

The Great Andaman islands run in a north–south line for some 350 km but are only some 50 km wide at their widest extent. This peculiar geography meant that each tribe typically had only two or three neighbours. Indeed, until colonial times, the northern and southern tribes seemed unaware of each other's existence. Except for the Bea and Bale, who had intense and friendly relations and whose languages were mutually intelligible to some extent, there was little interaction between the tribes at the time of first European contacts. The tribes were further split into smaller units—"septs", "local groups", and families—and also between shore-dwellers (aryoto) and forest-dwellers (eremtaga).

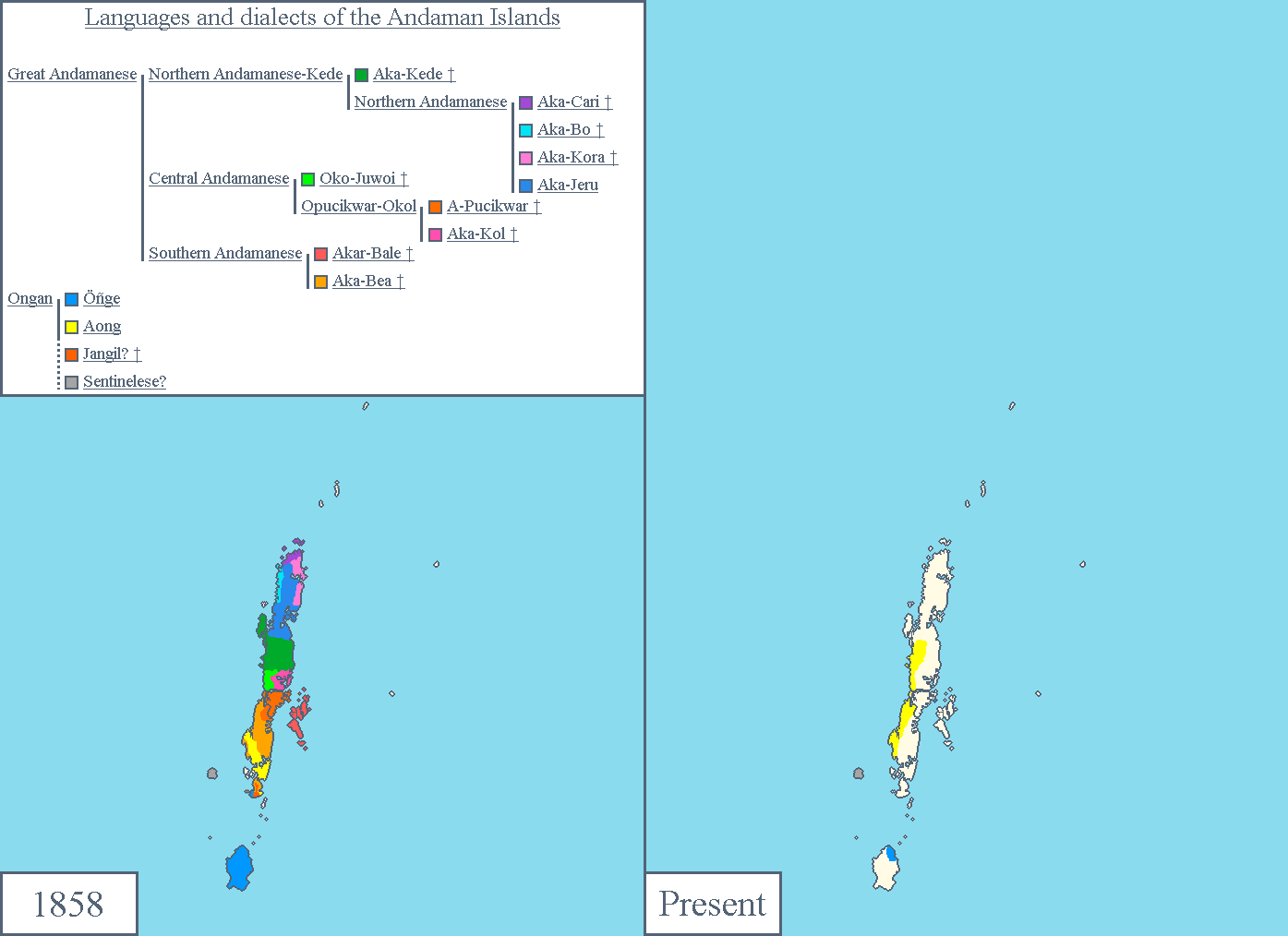
The distributions of different Andamanese peoples, languages, and dialects at the time of British contact compared to the present-day.

=== Population decline ===
Estimates of the Great Andamanese population by the time of the establishment of a British colonial presence (1789–1796) vary between 2000 and 6600 individuals. When the British established a permanent settlement and penal colony on Great Andaman in the 1860s, the population was estimated at 3500. At that time their isolated culture was suddenly confronted with the industrial and colonial culture of 19th century Europe. The colonial administrators proactively tried to pacify and co-opt the tribes, recruiting them to capture escaped convicts. Populations went into sharp decline due to outside diseases. Outside infectious diseases, to which the islanders had no immunity, decimated the tribes at the end of the 19th century; In some cases, people who became sick were killed by other tribe members in an attempt to stop contagion. The migration of Indian settlers to the islands accelerated this decline.

By 1901, only 625 Great Andamanese were left, and following censuses reported steadily declining numbers: 455 in 1911, 207 in 1921, 90 in 1931. Von Eickstedt counted "around one hundred" in 1927.

In 1949, the surviving Great Andamanese were relocated to a reservation on Bluff Island (1.14 km^{2}) in an attempt to protect them from diseases and other threats. In 1951, after Indian independence, their numbers had shrunk to about 25, mostly from the northern tribes. They became extinct in the mid 20th century, but had a few admixed individuals which went to an all-time low of only 19 in 1961.

In 1969, the 23 surviving Great Andamanese were again relocated, to Strait Island (about 5 km^{2}). Their numbers have slowly increased since then, to 24 (1971 census), 26 (1981), 45 (1991), and 43 (2001). There were about 50 individuals living on Strait Island in 2006 and 52 individuals in January 2010. However, by 1995 the people identified as Great Andamanese already included many people with partly Burmese or Hindi descent.

As the Great Andamanese retreated, the Jarawa occupied part of their former territory on the west coast of Great Andaman, which they were still inhabiting as of 2011. Also, by 1911, some 80 Onge had moved into the former territory of the Bea and the Jangil, in Rutland Island and South Andaman; however by 1921 they had dwindled to 61, and were gone by 1931.

=== Current status ===
Today only two tribes (Jeru and Bo) remain in significant number; the Cari tribe is on its way to extinction. There are still a few people (all elderly) with partial Kora and Pucikwar descent, but they identify themselves as either Jeru or Bo. However, the cultural and linguistic identities of the individual tribes have largely been lost; their members now speak mostly Hindi or a mixed language, a Great Andamanese creole.

Although the Great Andamanese on Strait Island still obtain some of their diet from hunting, fishing and gathering, they now consume rice and other Indian food, and are dependent on support by the Indian government for survival. They now practice some agriculture, and have established some poultry farms.

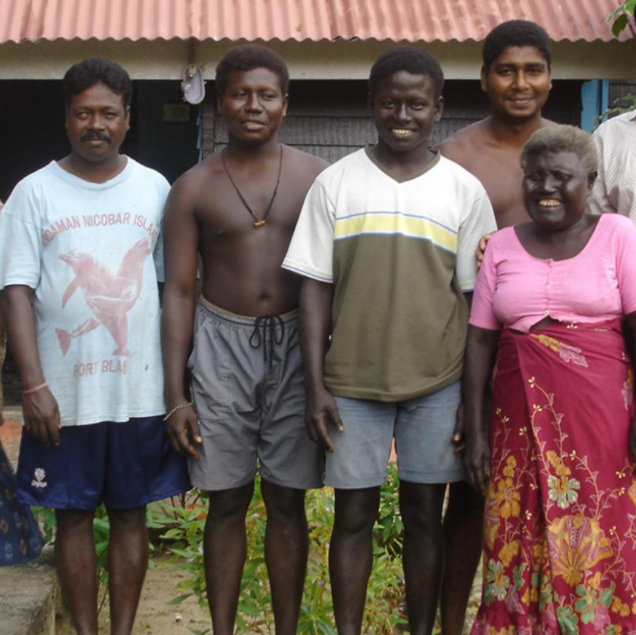
An Andamanese family on the Great Andaman island in 2006, including Boa Sr (right).

=== Census figures ===
Names and spellings, with populations, from the 1901 and 1994 censuses were as follows:

1901 census
Aka-Cari: 39
Aka-Cora: 96
Aka-Bo: 48
Aka-Jeru: 218
Aka-Kede: 59
Aka-Kol: 11
Oka-Juwoi: 48
Aka-Pucikwar: 50
Aka-Bale: 19
Aka-Bea: 37

1994 census
Aka-Jeru: 19
Aka-Bo: 15
Aka-Kari [sic]: 2
('local': 4)
