= Okol language =

Extinct Great Andamanese language of India

Kol
- O-Kol
- Native to: India
- Region: Andaman Islands; southeast Middle Andaman island.
- Ethnicity: Kol
- Extinct: by 1921
- Language family: Great Andamanese: Central Andamanese; Opucikwar–Okol; Kol

Language codes
- ISO 639-3: aky
- Glottolog: akak1253
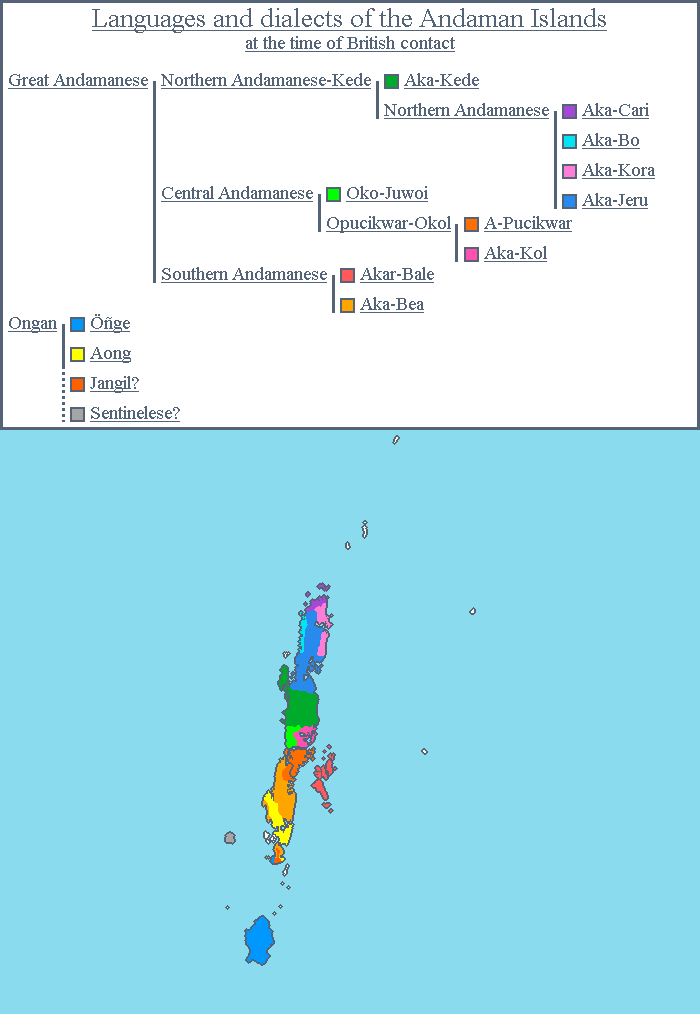
- Okol

The Kol language, O-Kol, is an extinct Great Andamanese language, of the Central group. It was spoken in the southeast section of Middle Andaman.

== History ==
The Kol were one of the indigenous peoples of the Andaman Islands, one of the ten or so Great Andamanese tribes identified by British colonials in the 1860s. Their language was closely related to the other Great Andamanese languages. They were extinct as a distinct people by 1921.

== Grammar ==
The Great Andamanese languages are agglutinative languages, with an extensive prefix and suffix system. They have a distinctive noun class system based largely on body parts, in which every noun and adjective may take a prefix according to which body part it is associated with (on the basis of shape, or functional association). Thus, for instance, the *aka- at the beginning of the language names is a prefix for objects related to the tongue.

The prefixes are,

	Kol
head/heart	ôto-
hand/foot	ôn-
mouth/tongue	o-
torso (shoulder to shins)	o-
eye/face/arm/breast	er-
back/leg/butt	a-
waist

Body parts are inalienably possessed, requiring a possessive adjective prefix to complete them, so one cannot say "head" alone, but only "my, or his, or your, etc. head".

The basic pronouns are almost identical throughout the Great Andamanese languages.

'This' and 'that' are distinguished as k- and t-.

Judging from the available sources, the Andamanese languages have only two cardinal numbers — one and two — and their entire numerical lexicon is one, two, one more, some more, and all.
