= Akakede =

Extinct Great Andamanese language of India

Kede
- Aka-Kede
- Native to: India
- Region: Andaman Islands; central and north central Middle Andaman island.
- Ethnicity: Kede
- Extinct: between 1931 and 1951
- Language family: Great Andamanese: Northern Andamanese – Kede; Kede

Language codes
- ISO 639-3: akx
- Glottolog: akak1252
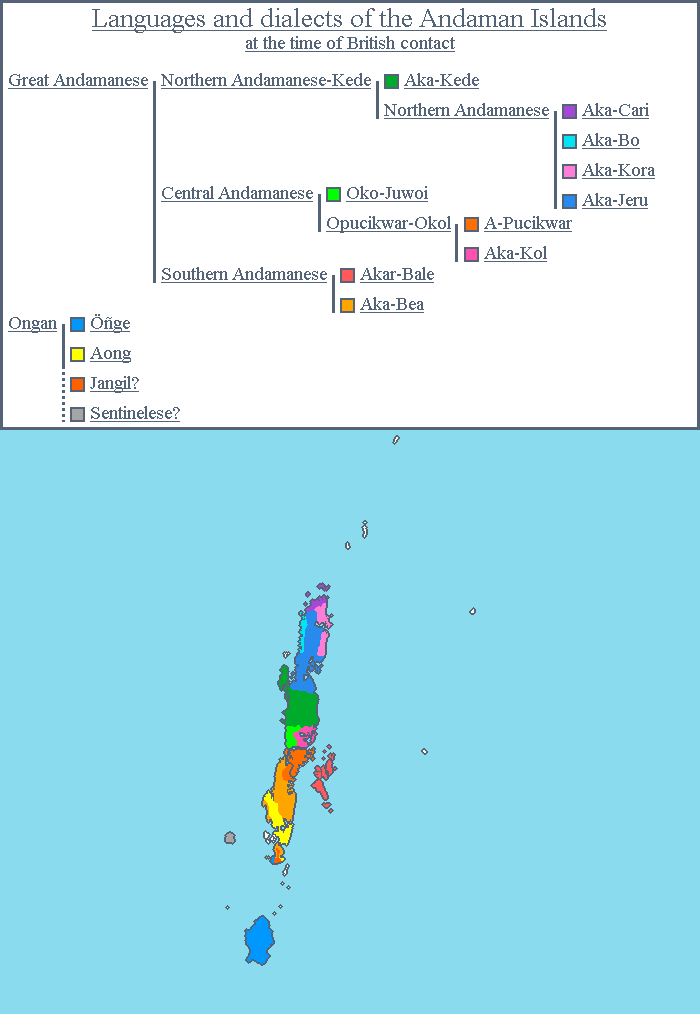
- Aka-Kede

The Kede language, Aka-Kede, is an extinct Great Andamanese language, of the Northern group. It was spoken in the Northern section of Middle Andaman island (Justin 2000).

== History ==
The Kede were one of the indigenous peoples of the Andaman Islands, one of the ten or so Great Andamanese tribes identified by British colonials in the 1860s. Their language was closely related to the other Great Andamanese languages. They disappeared as a distinct group sometime after 1931.

== Grammar ==
The Great Andamanese languages are agglutinative languages, with an extensive prefix and suffix system. They have a distinctive noun class system based largely on body parts, in which every noun and adjective may take a prefix according to which body part it is associated with (on the basis of shape, or functional association). Thus, for instance, the *aka- at the beginning of the language names is a prefix for objects related to the tongue.

Body parts are inalienably possessed, requiring a possessive adjective prefix to complete them, so one cannot say "head" alone, but only "my, or his, or your, etc. head".

'This' and 'that' are distinguished as k- and t-.

Judging from the available sources, the Andamanese languages have only two cardinal numbers — one and two — and their entire numerical lexicon is one, two, one more, some more, and all.

== Sources ==
- Justin, Anstice (2000). "Who Are the Jarawa?". A discussion of public nomenclature, published at andaman.org. Available at: https://web.archive.org/web/20100608094507/http://www.andaman.org/BOOK/originals/Justin/art-justs.htm
