= Northern Andamanese language =

Native language of North Andaman Island, India

Northern Andamanese
- Native to: India
- Region: Andaman Islands; North Andaman island
- Ethnicity: Andamanese
- Native speakers: 3 (2020)
- Language family: Great Andamanese: Northern Andamanese – Kede; Northern Andamanese
- Dialects: Akacari (Cari) †; Akakhora (Kora) †; Akabo (Bo) †; Akajeru (Jeru)

Language codes
- ISO 639-3: Variously: aci – Aka-Cari ack – Aka-Kora akj – Aka-Jeru akm – Aka-Bo
- Glottolog: nort2678
- Great andamanese [sic] is classified as Critically Endangered according to the UNESCO Atlas of the World's Languages in Danger.

Northern Andamanese is the critically endangered native language of North Andaman Island. It is closely related to Akakede and seems to have consisted of four mutually intelligible dialects: Akachari (Cari), Akakhora (Kora), Akabo (Bo), and Akajeru (Jeru). Jeru is the only one with speakers remaining.

When the North Andamanese people were resettled to Strait Island, a koiné developed from the resulting mixture of dialects. It went extinct in the early 2000s.
