= Badra, India =

Badra
- Census town
- Location in Madhya Pradesh, India Badra (India)
- Coordinates: 23.1923500°N 81.9119700°E
- Country: India
- State: Madhya Pradesh
- District: Shahdol

Population (2001)
  - Total: 4,755

Languages
  - Official: Hindi
- Time zone: UTC+5:30 (IST)
- ISO 3166 code: IN-MP
- Vehicle registration: MP

Badra is a census town in Shahdol district in the state of Madhya Pradesh, India.

== Geography ==
Badra is located at 23°11′32″N 81°54′43″E.

== Demographics ==
As of 2001 India census, Badra had a population of 4755. Males constitute 53% of the population and females 47%. Badra has an average literacy rate of 58%, lower than the national average of 59.5%; with 63% of the males and 37% of females literate. 14% of the population is under 6 years of age.
