= Cari people =

Indigenous people of Indian ocean islands

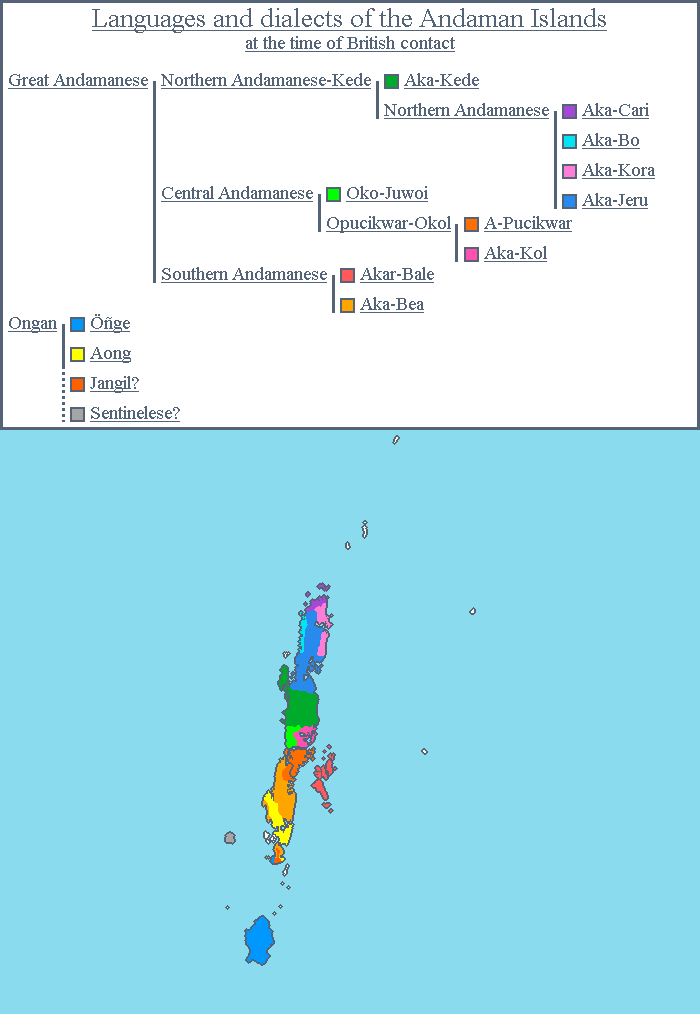
Territory of the Kari (Aka-Cari) and other Andamanese peoples at the time of British contact.

The Cari people, or Chariar, were one of the ten indigenous Great Andamanese peoples, originally living on the northernmost part of North Andaman Island and on Landfall Island in the Indian Ocean.

The Cari spoke a distinctive dialect, Akachari, closely related to the other dialects of the Northern Andamanese language. They were exclusively shore-dwellers (aryoto).

== History ==
The Cari population at the time of first European contacts (in the 1790s) has been estimated at 100 individuals, out of perhaps 3,500 Great Andamanese. Like other Andamanese peoples, the Cari were decimated during colonial and post-colonial times, by diseases, alcohol, colonial warfare and loss of territory. The population was down to 39 individuals in the 1901 census, falling to 36 in 1911, 17 in 1921, and 9 in 1931.

In 1949 any remaining Cari were forcibly relocated, together with all other surviving Great Andamanese, to a reservation on Bluff island; and then again in 1969 to a reservation on Strait Island.

By 1994, the population was reduced to only two women, aged 57 and 59, and therefore on its way to extinction. The Cari are a designated Scheduled Tribe.
