= Akakhora =

Extinct Great Andamanese language

Kora
- Cora
- Aka-Kora
- Native to: India
- Region: Andaman Islands; northeast and north central coasts of North Andaman Island, Smith Island
- Ethnicity: Kora
- Extinct: November 2009, with the death of Boro
- Language family: Great Andamanese: Northern Andamanese – Kede; Northern Andamanese; Kora

Language codes
- ISO 639-3: ack
- Glottolog: akak1251
- ELP: Aka-Kora
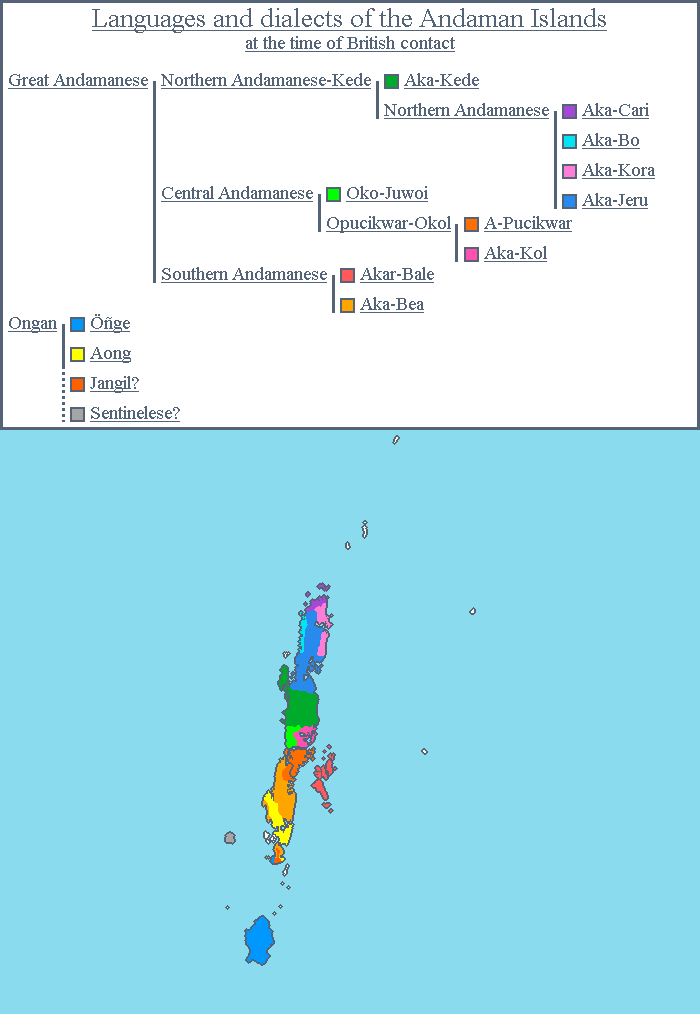
- Aka-Khora

- Akakhora is an Extinct language according to the classification system of the UNESCO Atlas of the World's Languages in Danger

Akakhora, or Kora (Cora), is an extinct dialect of the Northern Andamanese language. It was spoken on the northeast and north central coasts of North Andaman and on Smith Island.

It has been extinct since November 2009 when its last speaker, Boro, died. It is likely a variety of a Northern Great Andamanese language, as it is very similar to Aka-Jeru, without any unique features.

== Name ==
The native name for the language was Aka-Kora, also spelled Aka-Khora or Aka-Cora (Aka- being a prefix for "tongue"); and this name is often used for the tribe itself. They were divided between shore-dwellers (aryoto) and forest-dwellers (eremtaga) subtribes.

== History ==
By the time of the establishment of the first permanent colonial settlement at Port Blair (1858), the estimates size of the Kora tribe was about 500 individuals, out of perhaps 3500 Great Andamanese. However the tribe was discovered only much later, in the work leading to the 1901 census. Like other Andamanese peoples, the Kora were decimated during colonial and post-colonial times, by diseases, alcohol, opium and loss of territory. The census of 1901 recorded 96 individuals, which decreased to 71 in 1911, 48 in 1921, and 24 in 1931.

In 1949, any remaining Kora were relocated, with all other surviving Great Andamanese, to a reservation on Bluff island. In 1969 they were relocated again to a reservation on Strait Island.

By 1980 only one person claimed to be a Kora member, and by 1994 the Kora tribe no longer existed as a separate unit. Although descendants of the Kora were still living in the Great Andamanese reservation of Strait Island as of 2006, they identified themselves as members of other tribes, mainly Jeru. The last known speaker of the Kora language died in November 2009. They were a designated Scheduled Tribe.

== Grammar ==
The Great Andamanese languages are agglutinative languages, with an extensive prefix and suffix system. They have a distinctive noun class system based largely on body parts, in which every noun and adjective may take a prefix according to which body part it is associated with (on the basis of shape, or functional association). Thus, for instance, the *aka- at the beginning of the language names is a prefix for objects related to the tongue.

Body parts are inalienably possessed, requiring a possessive adjective prefix to complete them, so one cannot say "head" alone, but only "my, or his, or your, etc. head".

Judging from the available sources, the Andamanese languages have only two cardinal numbers — one and two — and their entire numerical lexicon is one, two, one more, some more, and all.
