= Bluff Island (Andaman Islands) =

- Location within Andaman and Nicobar Islands

Geography
- Location: Bay of Bengal
- Coordinates: 12.247°N 92.698°E
- Archipelago: Andaman Islands
- Adjacent to: Indian Ocean
- Area: 0.21 km^{2} (0.081 sq mi)
- Length: 0.8 km (0.5 mi)
- Width: 0.4 km (0.25 mi)
- Coastline: 2.27 km (1.411 mi)

Administration
- India
- District: North and Middle Andaman
- Island group: Andaman Islands
- Island sub-group: West Baratang Group
- Taluk: Rangat Taluk

Demographics
- Population: 0 (2016)

Additional information
- Time zone: IST (UTC+5:30)
- PIN: 744202
- Telephone code: 031927
- ISO code: IN-AN-00
- Official website: www.and.nic.in
- Literacy: 84.4%
- Avg. summer temperature: 30.2 °C (86.4 °F)
- Avg. winter temperature: 23.0 °C (73.4 °F)
- Sex ratio: 1.2♂/♀
- Census Code: 35.639.0004
- Official Languages: Hindi, English

Bluff Island is an island of the Andaman Islands. It belongs to the North and Middle Andaman administrative district, part of the Indian union territory of Andaman and Nicobar Islands. The island lies 64 km (40 mi) north from Port Blair.

== Geography ==
The island belongs to the West Baratang Group and lies south of Spike Island. The island is separated from South Andaman to the south by narrow channel, 500 m wide. It is 30 metres high to the tops of the trees.

== Administration ==
Politically, Bluff Island, along neighboring Baratang Islands, is part of Rangat Taluk.

== Demographics ==
The island was previously inhabited. In 1949, the few surviving Great Andamanese people were relocated to this island to protect them from diseases and other threats. On this island their population reached the all-time low of 19 individuals in 1961. In 1969 they were relocated to the slightly larger Strait Island.

== Fauna ==
Bluff Island and the surrounding waters are a wildlife sanctuary of India, initiated in 1987 as a nature preserve. with an area of 1.14 km^{2}.
