= Strait Island =

Andaman Islands, India

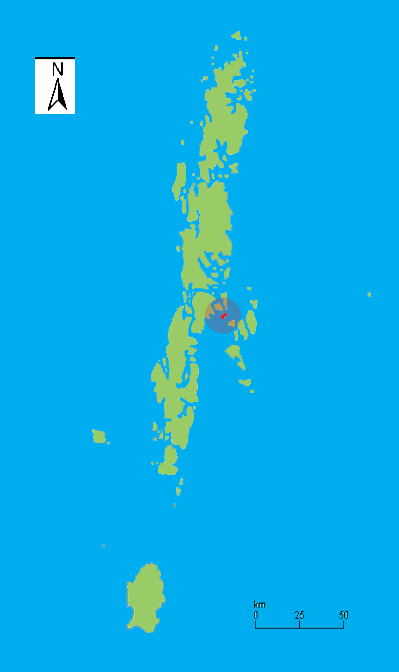
- Location of Strait Island highlighted in red, within Andaman Islands

- Location of Strait Island

Geography
- Location: Bay of Bengal
- Coordinates: 12.215°N 92.930°E
- Archipelago: Andaman Islands
- Adjacent to: Indian Ocean
- Area: 2.87 km^{2} (1.11 sq mi)
- Length: 3.2 km (1.99 mi)
- Width: 1.5 km (0.93 mi)
- Coastline: 8.7 km (5.41 mi)
- Highest elevation: 27 m (89 ft)

Administration
- India
- District: North and Middle Andaman
- Island group: Andaman Islands
- Island sub-group: East Baratang Group
- Taluk: Rangat Taluk
- Largest settlement: Strait village

Demographics
- Population: 39 (2016)
- Pop. density: 13.59/km^{2} (35.2/sq mi)
- Ethnic groups: Hindu, Andamanese

Additional information
- Time zone: IST (UTC+5:30)
- PIN: 744203
- Telephone code: 031927
- ISO code: IN-AN-00
- Official website: www.and.nic.in
- Literacy: 84.4%
- Avg. summer temperature: 30.2 °C (86.4 °F)
- Avg. winter temperature: 23.0 °C (73.4 °F)
- Sex ratio: 1.2♂/♀
- Census Code: 35.639.0004
- Official Languages: Hindi, English

Strait Island is an island of the Andaman Islands. It belongs to the North and Middle Andaman administrative district, part of the Indian union territory of Andaman and Nicobar Islands. The island lies 63 km (39 mi) north from Port Blair.

== History ==
Strait Island is a tribal reservation. The reservation for the Great Andamanese, one of the indigenous people of the Andaman Islands, was built and is managed by the Andaman administration. The Andamanese settlement was constructed like a model village in India. The Great Andamanese settlement was constructed with concrete houses in rows. The other half is occupied by welfare personnel and police quarters. There is a school for children and a small dispensary for primary health care. There is a lighthouse at the top of the tallest hill on the island, established 1983.

== Geography ==
Strait Island is a small island located 6 km (4 mi) east of Baratang Island, Great Andaman, in the Diligent Strait, which separates Great Andaman from Ritchie's Archipelago. The island belongs to the East Baratang Group and lies east of Colebrooke Island. The island is comma-shaped, and heavily forested.

== Fauna ==
Strait Island is known for its caves of birds' nests and plentiful deer (though they are now rare).

== Economy ==
The villagers' occupations are growing coconut palms, tamarind, and mango trees.

== Administration ==
Politically, Strait Island, along neighboring East Baratang Group, is part of Rangat Taluk.

== Demographics ==
There is only 1 village, located at the island. The population at the 2011 census was 39 (of which 26 were male), living in 15 households.

=== Transportation ===
From the Port Blair harbour, there is a bi-weekly ferry service which is the only mode of conveyance available.
